= Kincardineshire =

Coordinates: 56°55′N 2°30′W

Kincardineshire A' Mhaoirne
- Historic county
- Country: Scotland
- County town: Stonehaven

Area
  - Total: 380 sq mi (984 km^{2})
- Ranked 22nd of 34
- Chapman code: KCD
- Website: https://www.kincardineshirelieutenancy.co.uk/

Kincardineshire or the County of Kincardine, also known as the Mearns (from the Scottish Gaelic A' Mhaoirne meaning "the stewartry"), is a historic county, registration county and lieutenancy area on the coast of north-east Scotland. It is bounded by Aberdeenshire on the north, and by Angus on the south-west.

The county was named after its original county town of Kincardine, near Fettercairn. The county town was changed to Stonehaven in 1600, by which time the town of Kincardine was in decline, and it was later abandoned. Other towns in the county include Banchory, Inverbervie and Laurencekirk.

The county stopped being used as an administrative area in 1975. Since 1996, most of the historic county lies within the Aberdeenshire council area, with the exception of Nigg, which is in Aberdeen City. The name "Kincardine" is used in Kincardine and Mearns, a committee area of the Aberdeenshire Council, although this covers a smaller area than the county.

== History ==
Anciently, the area was the province of Mearns, bordered on the north by Marr, and on the south-west by Angus. The name of the province simply refers to its status; the more important provinces were administered by a great steward (mormaer), while the less important ones were governed by a mere steward (maer).

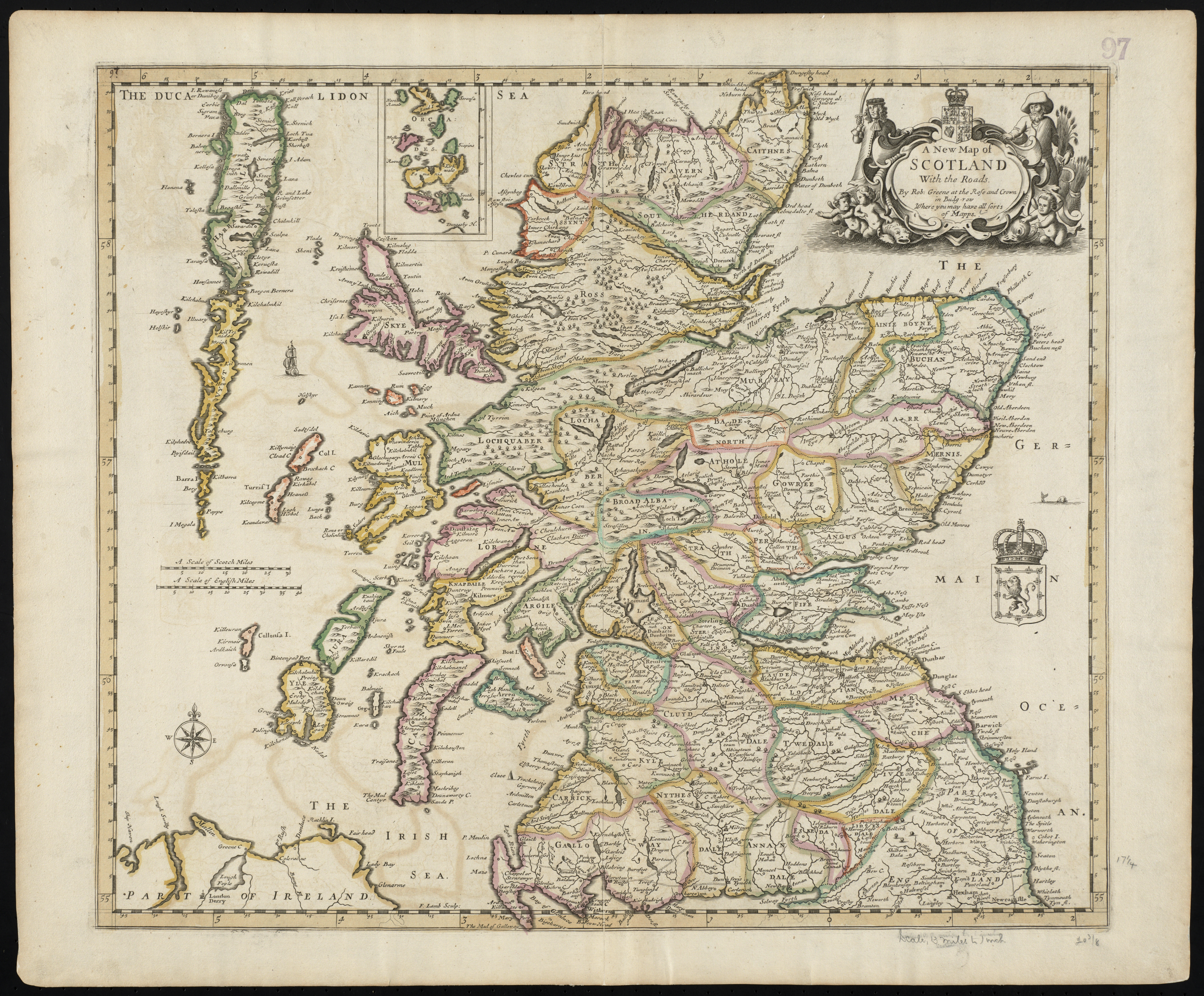
Map of Scottish provinces in 1689 with the Mearns labelled as 'Mernis'.

From the 12th century, sheriffs were also gradually introduced across Scotland, with responsibility for administering justice across an area known as a sheriffdom or shire. A sheriff for the area is known to have existed by the 1160s.

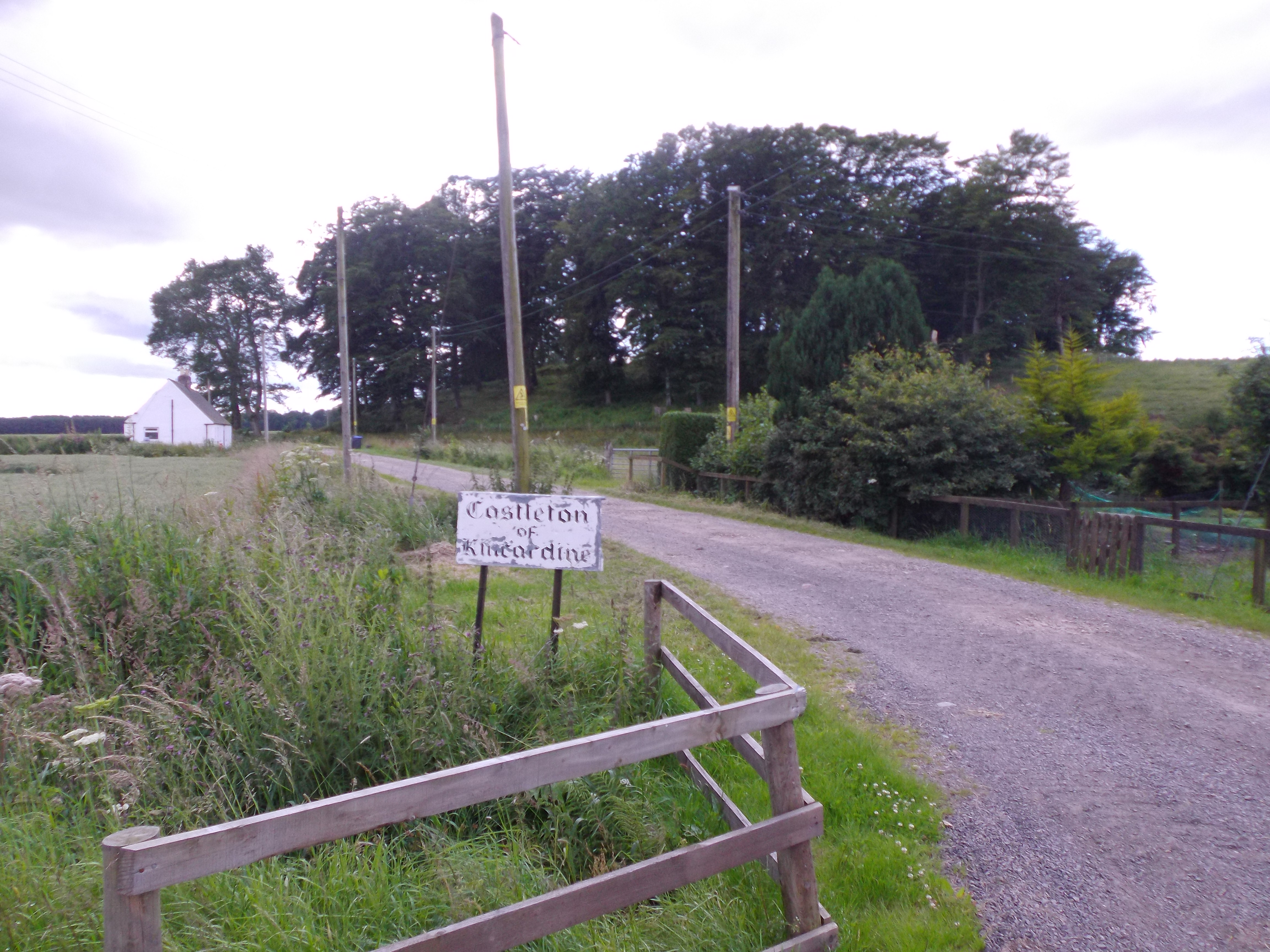
The hamlet of Castleton of Kincardine, where Kincardine Castle and the original county town of Kincardine once stood

Court cases were initially heard in the town of Kincardine, where there was a royal castle. (Note: The town of Kincardine was in the parish of Fordoun, north-east of Fettercairn. It should not be confused with other places called Kincardine, such as Kincardine O'Neil in the province of Marr or Kincardine-on-Forth in Fife.) The sheriff was therefore known both as the Sheriff of Kincardine and the Sheriff of the Mearns. In 1296, King John Balliol wrote a letter of surrender from Kincardine Castle to Edward I of England after a short war that marked the beginning of the Wars of Scottish Independence.

A charter granted to the burgh of Kincardine in 1532 noted the town's established role in hosting the shire's courts. However, by 1600 the town was in decline. The sheriffs and visiting judges complained that the town had poor facilities for holding courts and accommodating visitors when the courts were in session, and also noted that the town was not central to the shire. An act of the Parliament of Scotland, the Stonehaven Act 1600 (c. 51 (S)), therefore transferred the courts to the larger and more accessible town of Stonehaven. Kincardine's decline continued after 1600; its market and fair relocated to Fettercairn, and by the mid-19th century no trace remained of the former county town.

Over time, Scotland's shires became more significant than the old provinces, with more administrative functions being given to the sheriffs. The older territory of the Mearns was therefore gradually eclipsed in legal importance by the shire of Kincardine (or Kincardineshire) which covered the same area. In 1667 Commissioners of Supply were established for each shire, which would serve as the main administrative body for the area until the creation of county councils in 1890. Following the Acts of Union in 1707, the English term 'county' came to be used interchangeably with the older term 'shire'.

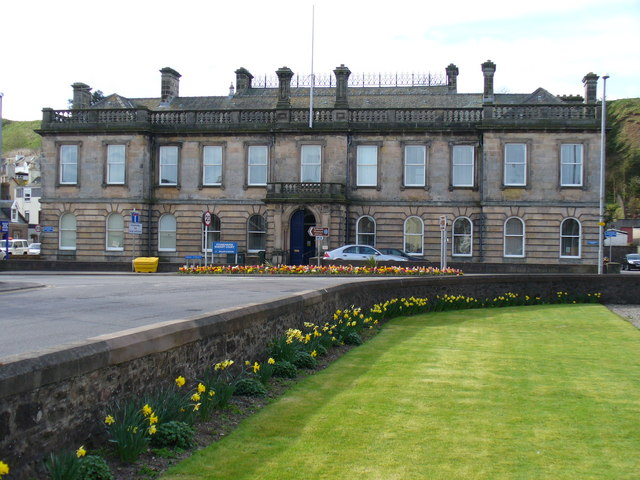
Stonehaven Sheriff Court, built 1865: Meeting place of Kincardineshire County Council, 1890–1935

Elected county councils were established in 1890 under the Local Government (Scotland) Act 1889, taking most of the functions of the commissioners, which were eventually abolished in 1930. The county council held its first official meeting on 22 May 1890 at the Stonehaven Sheriff Court, also known as County Buildings, the county's main courthouse (built 1865), which also served as the meeting place for the commissioners.

The 1889 act also led to a review of boundaries. Previously, four parishes had straddled the boundaries of Kincardineshire and its neighbours. The county and parish boundaries were therefore adjusted such that each parish was in a single county.

The parish of Nigg in the north-east of the county included the Torry area on the south bank of the River Dee, which by the late 19th century was developing into a suburb of Aberdeen. Torry was incorporated into the burgh of Aberdeen by the Aberdeen Corporation Act 1891. Torry remained part of the county of Kincardineshire for certain judicial functions until 1899, when Aberdeen was made a county of itself. Further parts of the parish of Nigg were likewise transferred to Aberdeen in 1935 (including Nigg village) and 1970.

In 1930, the county council absorbed the functions of the abolished county education authority, which had been based at offices in a converted house called Viewmount on Arduthie Road in Stonehaven. Viewmount burnt down in January 1932, and the county council took the opportunity to reconstruct and extend it to become a new headquarters, including a council chamber. The rebuilt Viewmount opened as the county council's meeting place and main offices in May 1935.

Kincardineshire County Council was abolished in 1975 under the Local Government (Scotland) Act 1973, which replaced Scotland's counties, burghs and landward districts with a two-tier structure of upper-tier regions and lower-tier districts. Kincardineshire became part of the new Grampian region. The remaining rural part of the parish of Nigg was transferred to the City of Aberdeen district, and the rest of the county became part of a new district called Kincardine and Deeside, which also included south-western parts of the former county of Aberdeenshire along the River Dee. A lieutenancy area covering the pre-1975 county except Nigg was created at the same time.

Further local government reforms in 1996 under the Local Government etc. (Scotland) Act 1994 saw the regions and districts created in 1975 abolished and replaced with council areas, with each council providing all local government services. Kincardine and Deeside district became part of the new Aberdeenshire council area. At the same time, the Kincardineshire lieutenancy area was confirmed to still correspond to the pre-1975 county excluding Nigg. The boundaries of the historic county of Kincardineshire (as it was in 1891 prior to the removal of Torry) are still used for some limited official purposes connected with land registration, being a registration county. Aberdeenshire Council has a Kincardine and Mearns area committee which covers most of the pre-1975 county.

== Geography ==
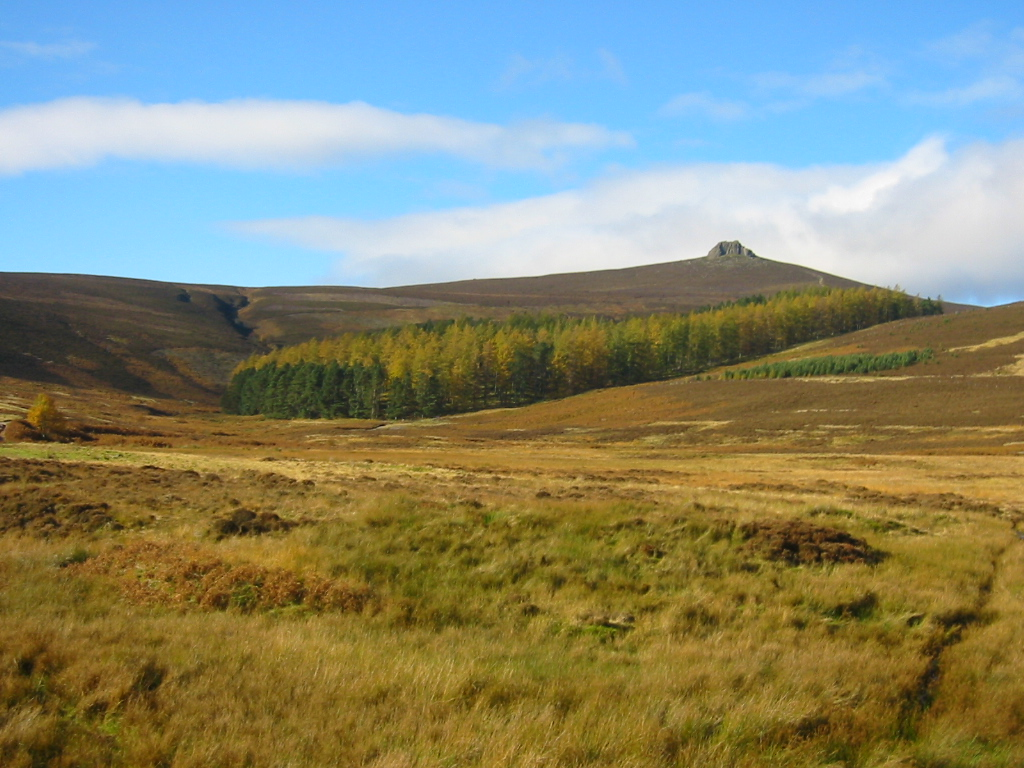
Clachnaben

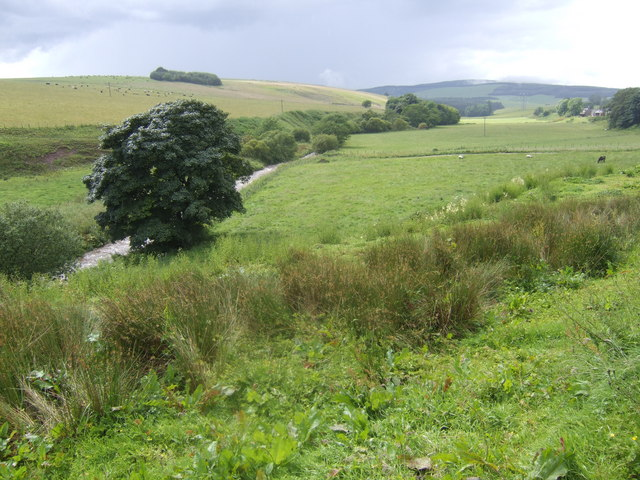
Countryside around Glenbervie

Roughly triangular in shape, Kincardineshire consists of the largely flat Strathmore area running parallel with the coast, with hillier, forested country in the interior, the latter forming part of the Grampian Mountains. The highest point is Mount Battock at 778 m (2,552 ft), lying on the border with Angus.

The county included the burghs of Stonehaven, Banchory, Inverbervie and Laurencekirk. Other settlements included Drumoak, Muchalls, Newtonhill and Portlethen. Mearns extended to Hill of Fare north of the River Dee.

=== Rivers ===
Among the rivers are Cowie Water, Carron Water, Luther Water, Burn of Muchalls, Burn of Pheppie, Burn of Elsick, Burn of Monboys, Bervie Water and the lower reaches of the River Dee.

== Structures and sites ==
- Allardice Castle
- Cowie Castle (ruins)
- Catterline
- Dunnottar Castle
- Fetteresso Castle
- Fowlsheugh Nature Reserve
- Lewis Grassic Gibbon Centre, Arbuthnott
- Muchalls Castle
- Portlethen Moss
- Stonehaven Tolbooth
- Ury House

== Coat of arms ==
The county's coat of arms displayed and reflected the history of the Honours of Scotland, which were kept at Dunnottar Castle and later at Kinneff, both within the historical boundaries of the county, during the Wars of the Three Kingdoms. It was: Gules, the Sceptre and Sword of Scotland crosswise in saltire, with the Crown of Scotland in chief and a ruined castle on a mound in base, all or. The motto was LAUS DEO, Latin for "Praise God". It was originally the motto of the Viscounts of Arbuthnott, whose seat is in the county, and the 14th Viscount was Lord Lieutenant of Kincardine at the time of the arms' matriculation by the Lord Lyon in 1927.

== Constituency ==
There was a Kincardineshire constituency of the House of Commons of the Parliament of Great Britain from 1708 to 1801 and of the Parliament of the United Kingdom from 1801 to 1918, representing the county of Kincardineshire, minus the parliamentary burgh of Inverbervie. Inverbervie was a component of the Aberdeen District of Burghs from 1708 to 1832 and of the Montrose District of Burghs from 1832 to 1950.

In 1918 the Kincardineshire constituency was merged with part of the Western Aberdeenshire constituency to form the Kincardine and Western Aberdeenshire constituency.

In 1950 Kincardine and Western Aberdeenshire was divided between the West Aberdeenshire constituency and the North Angus and Mearns constituency. North Angus and Mearns then covered the whole of the county of Kincardineshire, including the former parliamentary burgh of Inverbervie, and part of the county of Angus, the latter being previously within the Forfarshire constituency.

In 1983, eight years after the abolition of the local government county of Kincardineshire, North Angus and Mearns was replaced by new constituencies.

The county currently makes up part of the West Aberdeenshire and Kincardine constituency of the House of Commons.

== Transport ==
=== Rail ===
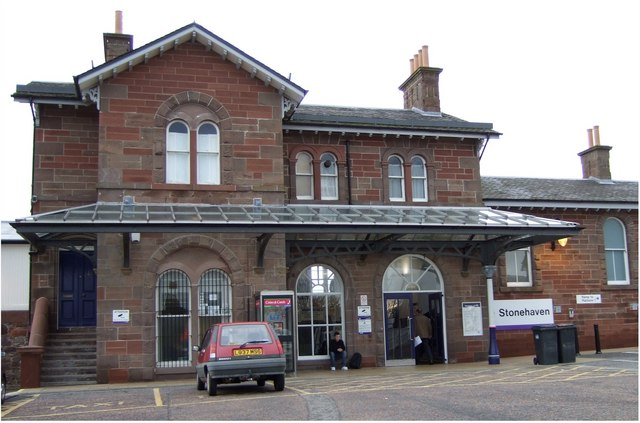
Stonehaven railway station

The Edinburgh-Aberdeen railway line runs parallel to the coast and through the towns of Laurencekirk, Stonehaven and Portlethen.

=== Historic transport routes ===
The ancient Causey Mounth road was built on high ground to make passable this only available medieval route from coastal points south to Aberdeen. This ancient passage specifically connected the Bridge of Dee to Muchalls Castle, Cowie Castle (and effectively Dunnottar Castle). The route was that taken by the Earl Marischal and Marquess of Montrose when they led a Covenanter army of 9,000 men in the first battle of the Bishops' Wars in 1639.

Elsick Mounth is a prehistoric trackway used by the Caledonian tribes as well as the Roman army in their northern invasion of the Scottish Highlands.

== Settlements ==
- Altens
- Arbuthnott
- Auchenblae
- Balnagask
- Banchory
- Bridge of Muchalls
- Cammachmore
- Catterline
- Chapelton of Elsick
- Cookney
- Cove Bay
- Crawton
- Downies
- Drumlithie
- Edzell Woods
- Fettercairn
- Findon
- Fordoun
- Glenbervie
- Gourdon
- Inverbervie
- Johnshaven
- Kincorth
- Kinneff
- Kirkton of Durris
- Laurencekirk
- Luthermuir
- Maryculter
- Marykirk
- Muchalls
- Netherley
- Newtonhill
- Nigg
- Old Portlethen
- Portlethen
- St Cyrus
- Stonehaven
- Tewel
- Torry
- Tullos
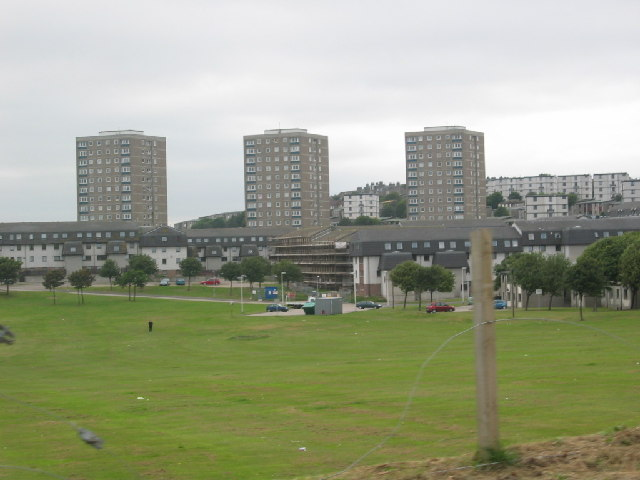
Balnagask

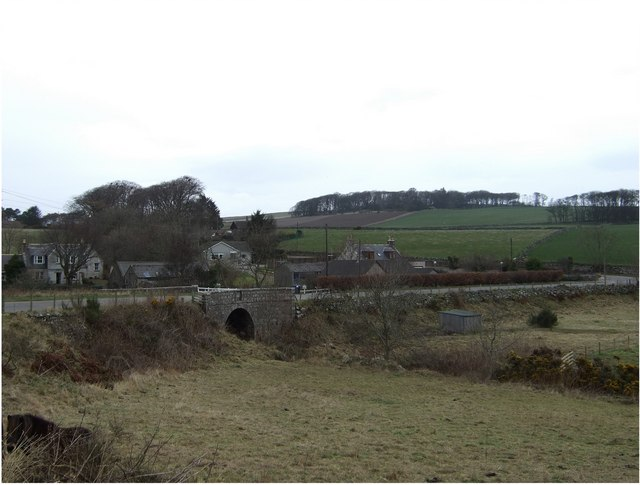
Bridge of Muchalls

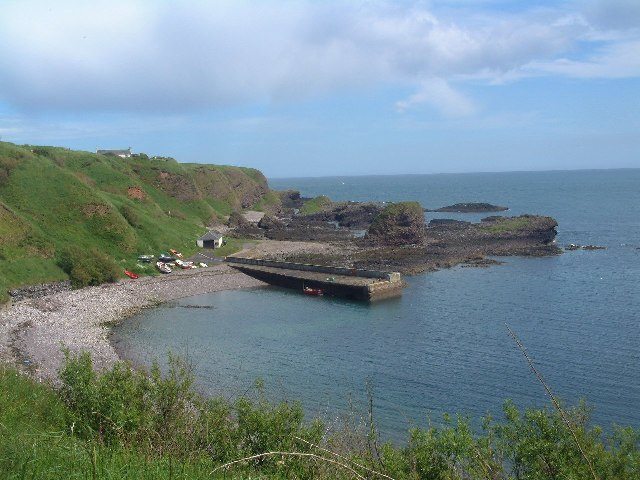
Catterline

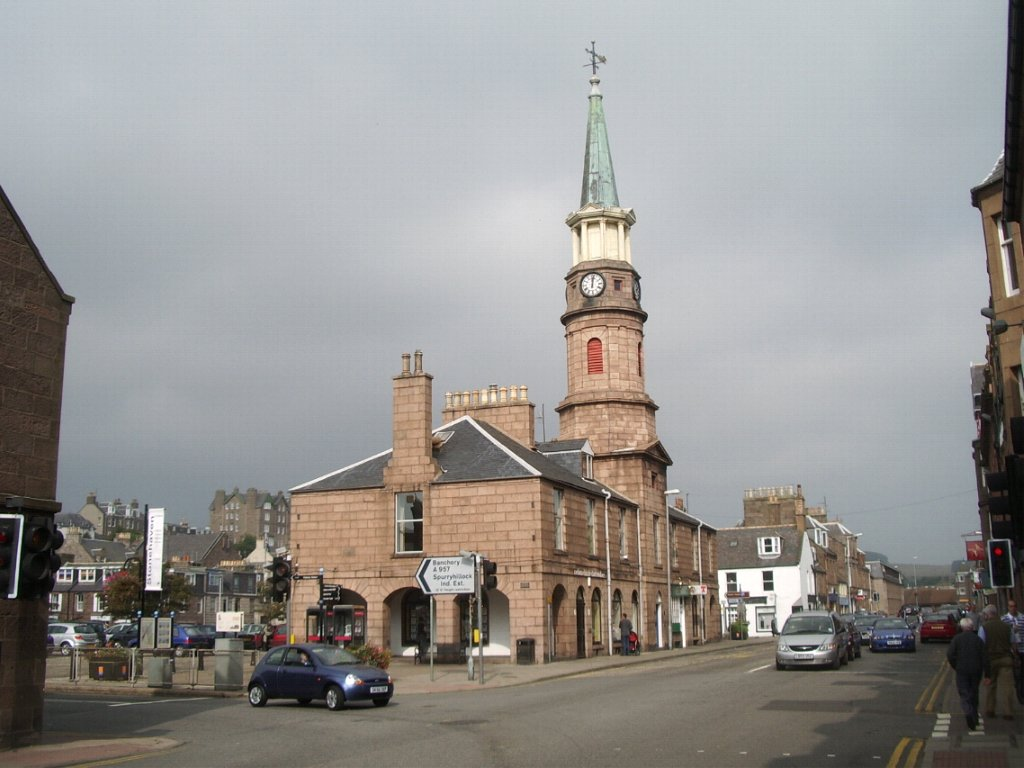
Stonehaven

== Notable people ==
The author Lewis Grassic Gibbon, born James Leslie Mitchell, was a Scottish writer. His Sunset Song is one of the best-known Scottish novels of the 20th century. It was voted Scotland's favourite book in a poll announced at the 2005 Edinburgh International Book Festival. Set in a fictional village in the Mearns, the book draws heavily from Mitchell's upbringing in Arbuthnott. One of the key features of the book, and some of his other writing, is the balanced and immersive use of the local Doric Scots dialect mixed with standard English, in a manner easily and enjoyably accessible to someone unfamiliar with the North East of Scotland.

- See also Category:People from Kincardine and Mearns

== Notable residents ==
- Richard Henry Brunton, born in Kincardine
- Cosmo Innes born in Durris Castle
- Hercules Linton (1837–1900), born in Inverbervie, designer of the Cutty Sark
- James Murdoch, born in Stonehaven
- James Taylor (tea planter) born on the Monboddo estate, Laurencekirk
- Robert William Thomson born in Stonehaven

== See also ==
- List of counties of Scotland 1890–1975
- Kincardine (disambiguation)
