= Cammachmore =

Hamlet in Aberdeenshire, Scotland

Coordinates: 57.0438°N 2.1588°W

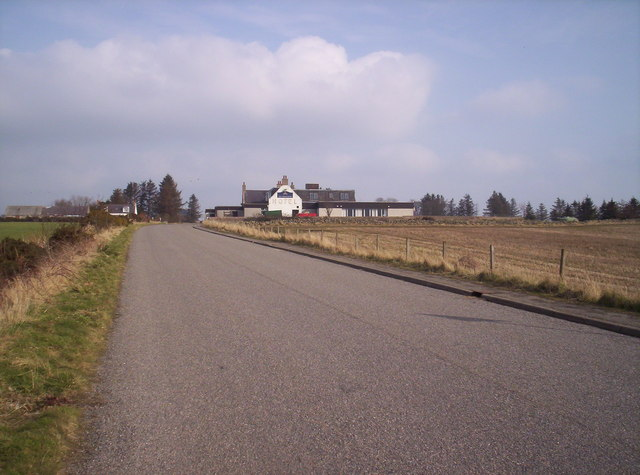
The now closed Cammach Inn

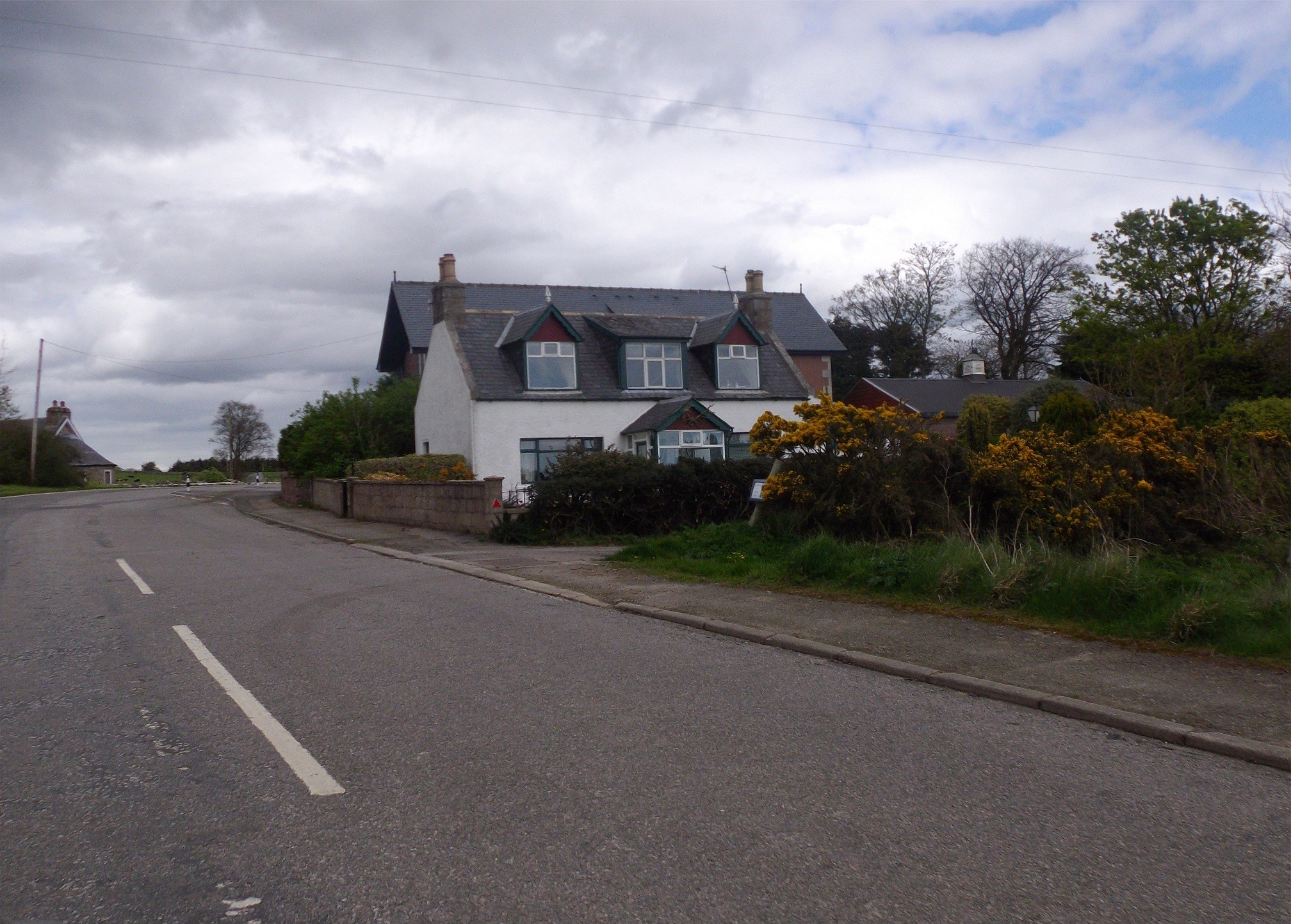

Cammachmore (Gaelic: An Camach Mòr) is a hamlet in the coastal region near the North Sea in Aberdeenshire, Scotland. It lies slightly west of the A92 road and the ancient Causey Mounth passes through the community. Historic Elsick House is situated due west of Cammachmore. Other nearby historic features include Gillybrands, Saint Ternan's Church, Muchalls Castle and the Lairhillock Inn.

== History ==
Cammachmore is situated along the ancient Causey Mounth trackway, which was constructed on high ground to make this medieval route the only available, passable route from the coastal points south from Stonehaven to Aberdeen. This ancient passage specifically connected the River Dee crossing (where the present Bridge of Dee is situated) via Portlethen Moss, Muchalls Castle and Stonehaven to the south. The route was that taken by William Keith, 7th Earl Marischal and the Marquess of Montrose when they led a Covenanter army of 9000 men in the battle of the Civil War in 1639.

From the industrial era of the 19th century there are some relics of old manufacturing equipment such as a circular-section brick chimney on a square stone base, serving a small single-storey engine and boiler house at an old smithy in Cammachmore.

== See also ==
- Burn of Elsick
- Newtonhill
- Old Bourtreebush
- Portlethen Moss
