= Cookney Church =

Church building in Cookney, Aberdeenshire, Scotland

Coordinates: 57°1′51″N 2°12′46″W

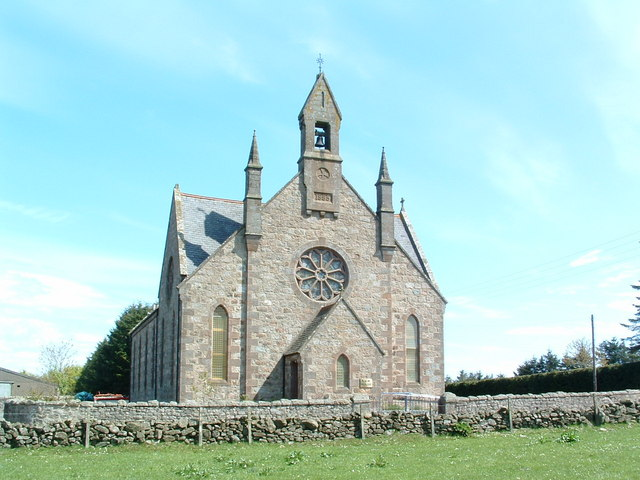
Cookney Church

Cookney Parish Church, now business premises within a converted listed building, was a Christian place of worship in the village of Cookney, Aberdeenshire, Scotland.

== Location ==
Cookney Church is perched on a prominent hill, and is visible for a considerable distance. The church is commonly used as a point of height comparison reference. For example, the Meikle Carewe Windfarm Action Group cited the Cookney Church in illustrating the height of proposed wind turbines in the region, by stating that the proposed new wind turbines would be "five times the height of the Cookney Church".

Other notable historic structures in this vicinity include Elsick House and Lairhillock Inn.

== History ==
The present structure was erected in 1885, although the original Cookney Church was founded on this site in the year 1816.

The National Library of Scotland has entered a communion token from the year 1859 as part of the significant artifacts of that year in Scotland.

There is considerable history of the Episcopal churches of the local area, with some early facilities being part of proximate Muchalls Castle. A very early Episcopal church had been constructed within Muchalls Castle itself in the first quarter of the 17th century. Earlier ruined Episcopal churches also exist slightly to the east on historical lands of Muchalls Castle. Cookney Church is situated somewhat west on a high hill and within view of the ancient trackway of the Causey Mounth; moreover, the Causey Mounth trackway was constructed in medieval times to make passable this only available route across the coastal region of the Grampian Mounth from points south from Stonehaven to Aberdeen. This ancient drovers' road specifically connected the River Dee crossing (where the present Bridge of Dee is situated) via Muchalls Castle and Stonehaven to the south. The route was that taken by William Keith, 7th Earl Marischal and the Marquess of Montrose when they led a Covenanter army of 9000 men in the first battle of the Civil War in 1639.

The Church is now a business address for a company called RUM Consultancy.

== See also ==
- Netherley
- Red Moss
