= List of listed buildings in Fetteresso =

This is a list of listed buildings in the parish of Fetteresso in Aberdeenshire, Scotland.

== List ==
Name	Location	Date Listed	Grid Ref. (Note: Sometimes known as OSGB36, the grid reference (where provided) is based on the British national grid reference system used by the Ordnance Survey. • "Guide to National Grid". Ordnance Survey. • "Get-a-map". Ordnance Survey.)	Geo-coordinates	Notes	LB Number (Note: Historic Environment Scotland assign a unique alphanumeric identifier to each designated site in Scotland, for listed buildings this always begins with "LB", for example "LB12345".)	Image
Muchalls, Marine Hotel				57°01′05″N 2°09′52″W	Category B	44607	Upload Photo
Old Schoolhouse, Bridge Of Muchalls				57°00′46″N 2°10′50″W	Category C(S)	9351	Upload Photo
1-7 Monduff Road Formerly 3-6 Main Street, Stranathro				57°01′17″N 2°09′41″W	Category C(S)	9355	Upload Photo
Ury - North Lodge				56°59′28″N 2°12′55″W	Category B	9376	Upload another image
Rickarton House				56°59′18″N 2°16′04″W	Category B	9378	Upload Photo
Rickarton House - Bridge Over Cowton Burn				56°59′26″N 2°16′10″W	Category C(S)	9379	Upload Photo
Cowton Bridge Over Cowton Burn				56°59′43″N 2°17′04″W	Category C(S)	9380	Upload Photo
Auquhollie Bridge Over Small Burn				57°00′12″N 2°17′09″W	Category C(S)	9381	Upload Photo
Newtonhill, 13 Skateraw Road				57°01′56″N 2°08′53″W	Category C(S)	13484	Upload Photo
Bridge Of Muchalls Over Muchalls Burn				57°00′39″N 2°10′34″W	Category C(S)	9350	Upload Photo
Lairhillock Bridge Over Monquich Burn				57°02′51″N 2°14′41″W	Category C(S)	9362	Upload Photo
Ury - Bridge Over Cowie Water				56°58′53″N 2°14′23″W	Category C(S)	9374	Upload Photo
Ury Estate, Baille Na Choile Including Terrace Wall And Boundary Wall				56°58′57″N 2°14′06″W	Category C(S)	49608	Upload Photo
Ury Estate, Blue Lodge				56°58′44″N 2°14′35″W	Category C(S)	49610	Upload Photo
Netherley House Hotel				57°02′06″N 2°15′18″W	Category B	9360	Upload another image
Ury, Houff Enclosing Walls				56°59′29″N 2°14′19″W	Category C(S)	6743	Upload Photo
Fetteresso Castle, Fetteresso Walled Garden, Including Summer House				56°57′36″N 2°15′47″W	Category C(S)	46514	Upload Photo
Ury Estate, Blue Gate Including Quadrant Walls				56°58′43″N 2°14′35″W	Category C(S)	49609	Upload Photo
Slug Road, New Lodge Boundary Walls And Gatepiers				56°58′19″N 2°13′30″W	Category C(S)	49615	Upload Photo
Kirkton Inn Bridge Over Cheyne Burn				56°57′45″N 2°14′32″W	Category B	9369	Upload Photo
Cheyne Farmhouse				56°58′22″N 2°15′32″W	Category B	9372	Upload Photo
Ury - Houff Mausoleum				56°59′29″N 2°14′20″W	Category C(S)	9375	Upload Photo
Ury Estate, Viaduct Over Cowie Water				56°58′52″N 2°14′22″W	Category B	49613	Upload Photo
Newtonhill, 15 Skateraw Road, St Margaret's Cottage				57°01′55″N 2°08′52″W	Category C(S)	13483	Upload Photo
Cowie Mains Steading				56°58′21″N 2°12′15″W	Category C(S)	9349	Upload Photo
Muchalls Castle - Doocot				57°01′02″N 2°10′50″W	Category B	9354	Upload Photo
Netherley Bridge Over Monquich Burn				57°02′15″N 2°14′52″W	Category C(S)	9359	Upload Photo
Kirkyard Walls				56°57′44″N 2°14′36″W	Category B	9366	Upload Photo
Cowie Chapel				56°58′37″N 2°11′32″W	Category B	9382	Upload Photo
Cowie Chapel - Dead-House				56°58′37″N 2°11′32″W	Category B	9383	Upload another image
Cowie House				56°58′30″N 2°11′59″W	Category B	9384	Upload Photo
Cowie House, Enclosure Walls				56°58′31″N 2°11′54″W	Category C(S)	9386	Upload Photo
Ury Estate, Ice House				56°58′52″N 2°13′55″W	Category C(S)	49612	Upload Photo
Slug Road, South Lodge Including Boundary Walls And Gatepiers				56°58′19″N 2°13′30″W	Category C(S)	49616	Upload Photo
Muchalls Castle, Coach House And Stables, Including Pump				57°01′03″N 2°10′51″W	Category B	13477	Upload Photo
Muchalls Castle				57°01′03″N 2°10′47″W	Category A	9352	Upload Photo
Berryhill House				57°02′58″N 2°09′43″W	Category B	9357	Upload Photo
Netherley House - Bridge Over Monquich Burn				57°02′07″N 2°15′10″W	Category C(S)	9361	Upload Photo
Newtonhill Skateraw Road Old Smokehouse				57°01′54″N 2°08′48″W	Category C(S)	9363	Upload Photo
Ury House And Terrace Walls				56°58′50″N 2°13′58″W	Category B	9364	Upload Photo
South Of Old Kirkton Inn				56°57′44″N 2°14′33″W	Category B	9368	Upload Photo
Findlayston Bridge Over Cowie Water				56°59′10″N 2°15′37″W	Category B	9377	Upload Photo
Ury Estate, Bridge Over Ury Burn				56°58′51″N 2°13′54″W	Category C(S)	49611	Upload Photo
Newhall House				57°02′20″N 2°11′35″W	Category B	9356	Upload another image
Old Kirkton Inn				56°57′45″N 2°14′33″W	Category B	9367	Upload Photo
Muchalls Castle, Gardener's Cottage				57°01′02″N 2°10′52″W	Category C(S)	13478	Upload Photo
Muchalls Castle - "The Crypt"				57°01′03″N 2°10′47″W	Category B	9353	Upload Photo
Cookney Church (Of Scotland)				57°01′50″N 2°12′50″W	Category C(S)	9358	Upload another image
Fetteresso Old Parish Kirk				56°57′43″N 2°14′36″W	Category B	9365	Upload Photo
Fetteresso Bridge Over Carron Water				56°57′40″N 2°14′37″W	Category B	9370	Upload Photo
Fetteresso Castle - Doocot				56°57′34″N 2°15′30″W	Category A	9371	Upload Photo
Fetteresso Castle				56°57′37″N 2°15′37″W	Category B	9373	Upload Photo
Cowie House, Offices				56°58′31″N 2°12′00″W	Category B	9385	Upload Photo
Cowie Mains Farmhouse				56°58′20″N 2°12′16″W	Category C(S)	9387	Upload Photo
Rickarton House, Gardener's Cottage				56°59′17″N 2°16′09″W	Category C(S)	6745	Upload Photo
Ury Estate, Walled Garden				56°58′55″N 2°14′10″W	Category C(S)	49614	Upload Photo

== Key ==
The scheme for classifying buildings in Scotland is:

- Category A: "buildings of national or international importance, either architectural or historic; or fine, little-altered examples of some particular period, style or building type."
- Category B: "buildings of regional or more than local importance; or major examples of some particular period, style or building type, which may have been altered."
- Category C: "buildings of local importance; lesser examples of any period, style, or building type, as originally constructed or moderately altered; and simple traditional buildings which group well with other listed buildings."

In March 2016 there were 47,288 listed buildings in Scotland. Of these, 8% were Category A, and 50% were Category B, with the remaining 42% being Category C.

== See also ==
- List of listed buildings in Aberdeenshire
