= Clan Carnegie =

Lowland Scottish clan

- Motto: Dred God

Profile
- District: Angus

Chief
- David Carnegie
- His Grace the 4th Duke of Fife
- Seat: Elsick House
Clan branches
Carnegie of Southesk
Carnegie of Northesk
Rival clans
Clan Lindsay

Clan Carnegie is a Lowland Scottish clan.

== History ==
=== Origins of the clan ===
Walter de Maule made a grant of the lands and barony of Carnegie, in the parish of Carmyllie, Angus to John de Balinhard in 1358. However, there is no certain record of the origins of the Balinhards, except that their lands were near Arbroath, Angus. Alexander Nisbet suggested that the Balinhards were related to the Ramsays, although there is no direct evidence to support this.

=== 15th and 16th century clan conflicts ===
In about 1401 Duthac de Carnegie acquired part of the lands of Kinnaird, in Forfarshire (Angus). They subsequently owned them from Robert Stewart, Duke of Albany in a charter dated 21 February 1409 confirming the lands. Duthac de Carnegie was killed at the Battle of Harlaw in 1411. He left an infant son, Walter Carnegie of Kinnaird who fought for James II of Scotland at the Battle of Brechin in May 1452 along with the Earl of Huntly. Their enemies were rebels commanded by the Earl of Crawford (chief of Clan Lindsay) who were defeated. However Crawford, in revenge, burned the village of Kinnaird.

John Carnegie of Kinnaird fought at the Battle of Flodden where he was killed in 1513. His son was Sir Robert Carnegie who extended Kinnaird and was appointed one of the judges of the College of Justice in 1547. He was also sent to England in 1548 to negotiate the ransom of the Earl of Huntly who had been captured at the Battle of Pinkie Cleugh. Sir Robert Carnegie is said to have been the first of the family to claim that his ancestors were cup bearers to the king of Scots and the family arms bear an antique cup as reference to this royal office.

Sir Robert's son was John Carnegie who was a faithful and loyal adherent to Mary, Queen of Scots and unlike many he never abandoned his loyalty to the queen. He died in 1595 and the estates passed to his younger brother, Sir David Carnegie.

=== 17th century and Civil War ===
David Carnegie was created Lord Carnegie of Kinnaird in April 1616 and was later advanced to the rank of Earl of Southesk in June 1633. Sir John Carnegie, brother of David, was elevated to the peerage in 1639 as Lord Lour and was created Earl of Ethie in 1647.

James Carnegie, 2nd Earl of Southesk attended the exiled king Charles II of England in Holland in 1650. He was also one of the Commissioners chosen to sit in the Parliament of England for Scotland during The Protectorate. He was nearly killed however, in a duel with the Master of Gray in London in 1660. The younger son of the third Earl did not have such a fortunate duelling career and was killed in 1681 in Paris by William, son of Elizabeth Maitland, Duchess of Lauderdale.

=== 18th century and Jacobite risings ===
The Clan Carnegie were Jacobites. The fourth Earl took no part in opposing the Glorious Revolution of 1688 but afterwards shunned the royal court. His son, the fifth Earl, followed the Old Pretender during the Jacobite rising of 1715 and as a result was attained by an Act of Parliament and his estates were forfeited to the Crown. The fifth Earl died in 1730 and all of his children had died young, as was the high rate of infant mortality at the time. He was succeeded by John Carnegie of Pittarrow who was descended from a younger son of the first Earl. This line of Carnegies had been created Baronets of Nova Scotia in 1663.

=== Modern history ===
The sixth Baronet was a distinguished soldier and in 1855 he was able to secure an Act of Parliament that reversed the attainder and restored the titles of Earl of Southesk as well as Lord Carnegie of Kinnaird and Leuchars. The ninth Earl chose the title of Baron of Balinhaird in reference to his family's origins and early ancestry.

The eleventh Earl married Her Highness Princess Maud, younger daughter of the Princess Royal and granddaughter of Edward VII. Her son, as well as being heir to his father's earldom of Southesk and chief of Clan Carnegie, also inherited the dukedom of Fife which was the title of his maternal grandfather. The eleventh Earl died in 1992 and his son, the Duke of Fife, succeeded as chief of the clan and the earldom of Southesk was kept as a subsidiary title in honor of his Carnegie ancestors.

== Clan tartan ==
The Carnegie tartan, based on the Glengarry tartan, was adopted in these times.

== Clan chief ==
As of 2015 the clan chief, with full titles, was His Grace David Carnegie, 4th Duke of Fife, Earl of Southesk, Earl of Macduff, Lord Carnegie of Kinnaird, Lord Carnegie of Kinnaird and Leuchars, Baron Balinhard of Farnell, Baronet and Chief of the Name and Arms of Carnegie.

== Clan seat ==
Elsick House.

== See also ==
- Scottish clan
- Earl of Southesk
- Earl of Northesk
