= Hare Moss =

Bog in Aberdeenshire, Scotland

Coordinates: 57.085°N 2.153°W

Hare Moss is a bog in Aberdeenshire, Scotland, in the vicinity of Banchory-Devenick. Hare Moss is a significant wetland ecosystem.

== History ==
Hare Moss is situated along the ancient elevated Causey Mounth trackway, this road had to be constructed on high ground to make it the only passable medieval route from coastal points south of Stonehaven to Aberdeen. This ancient passage specifically connected the River Dee crossing (where the Bridge of Dee is situated) via Hare Moss, Muchalls Castle and Stonehaven to the south. The route was that taken by William Keith, 7th Earl Marischal and the Marquess of Montrose when they led a Covenanter army of 9000 men in the battle of the Civil War in 1639.

== See also ==
- Old Bourtreebush
- Portlethen Moss
