= Chapelton, Aberdeenshire =

Town in Aberdeenshire, Scotland

Coordinates: 57.0344°N 2.1745°W

Chapelton
- Location within Aberdeenshire
- Population: 763
- Council area: Aberdeenshire
- Lieutenancy area: Kincardineshire
- Country: Scotland
- Sovereign state: United Kingdom
- Post town: STONEHAVEN
- Postcode district: AB39
- Police: Scotland
- Fire: Scottish
- Ambulance: Scottish

Chapelton (also called Chapelton of Elsick) is a 810 hectares (2,000 acres) new town in Aberdeenshire, Scotland, 10 miles (16 kilometres) south of Aberdeen. It is situated close to the A92 and Newtonhill. The town plan was led by the Elsick Development Company (EDC).

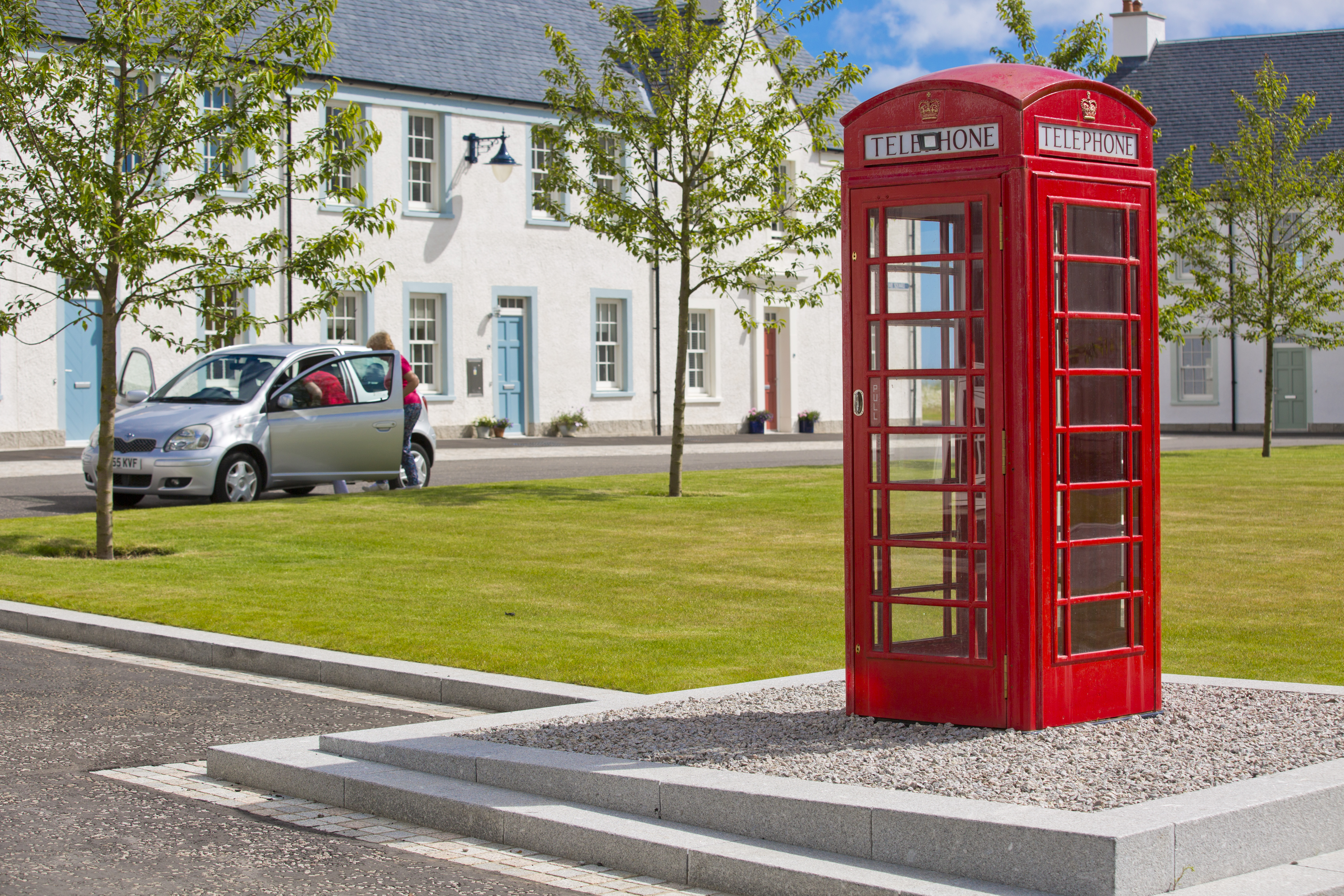
Hume Square, Chapelton (August 2016)

== Neighbourhoods ==
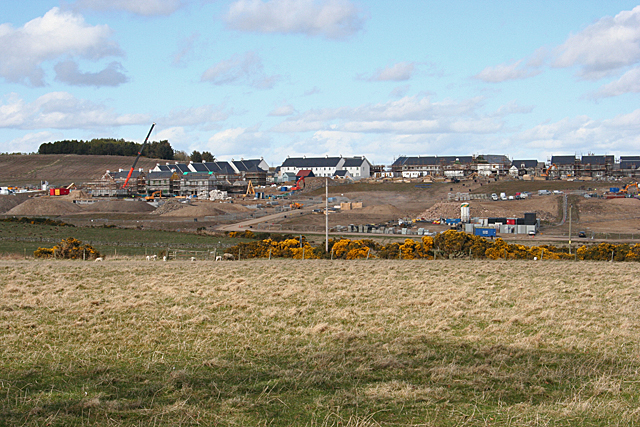
Construction of Cairnhill neighbourhood

The Outline Planning Permission proposes the development of over four thousand houses, along with shops, offices, parks and schools. These houses will be located in four neighbourhoods with one town centre, including a main high street. Longer-term, the Chapelton site can accommodate up to 8,000 houses within seven neighbourhoods.

The town masterplan was developed in consultation with over 5,000 local residents in 2010, as well as local professionals, Council officers and Scottish national agencies. Feedback received during this consultation process has shaped critical elements of the town, as well as the architectural plans.

The town is being built on a consortium of land, the majority of which is owned by David Carnegie, 4th Duke of Fife, who is also the director of the Elsick Development Company which is overseeing the development, and four local farming families.

=== Cairnhill ===
The first neighbourhood to be completed, Cairnhill, is situated on a 270-acre site near Newtonhill. The first part of the neighbourhood, centred on Hume Square and the 250 houses surrounding it has been completed. Hume Square is Chapelton's first public green, lined with traditional terraced houses and the town's first businesses.

== Houses ==
House styles in Chapelton vary from small apartments to five bedroom family homes. The architecture of the houses' exteriors have slate roof tiles and lime harl. Architectural details and materials in the first phase include slate roofs, timber windows (sash and case to public elevations), Dormer|dormer windows, timber linings to some extensions and garages, corrugated metal roofing, and some properties have working chimneys for wood-burning stoves. A small number of timber buildings with a modern feel are incorporated around the neighbourhood edge.

A design code for the area has been developed to ensure that the architecture and integrity of the original design cannot be altered or diminished.

== Services ==
The Chapelton Community Interest Company has been set up to manage many aspects of the new town, particularly those beyond the remit of Aberdeenshire Council. Community events are organised, commercial facilities and green spaces are managed. Directly accountable to residents, the CCIC also has the remit to regulate future development within the community to ensure that purchasers can be sure of the design that they buy into.

=== Schools ===
Chapelton has an award-winning nursery. Walters & Cohen, a specialist schools architect, has worked with EDC on schooling provision. Sites for three primary schools and one secondary school have been identified for the first four neighbourhoods. These schools will be located adjacent to commercial areas.

Options for immediate secondary education in Chapelton are still being developed in conjunction with Aberdeenshire Council's Education Department.

=== Health ===
A site for a medical practice has been included in the designs for the Cairnhill centre. Discussions are underway with NHS Grampian to explore the viability of this satellite practice in the early years.

EDC continues to work with NHS Grampian and others to develop the details of this strategy as it moves forward to implementation.

=== Transport ===
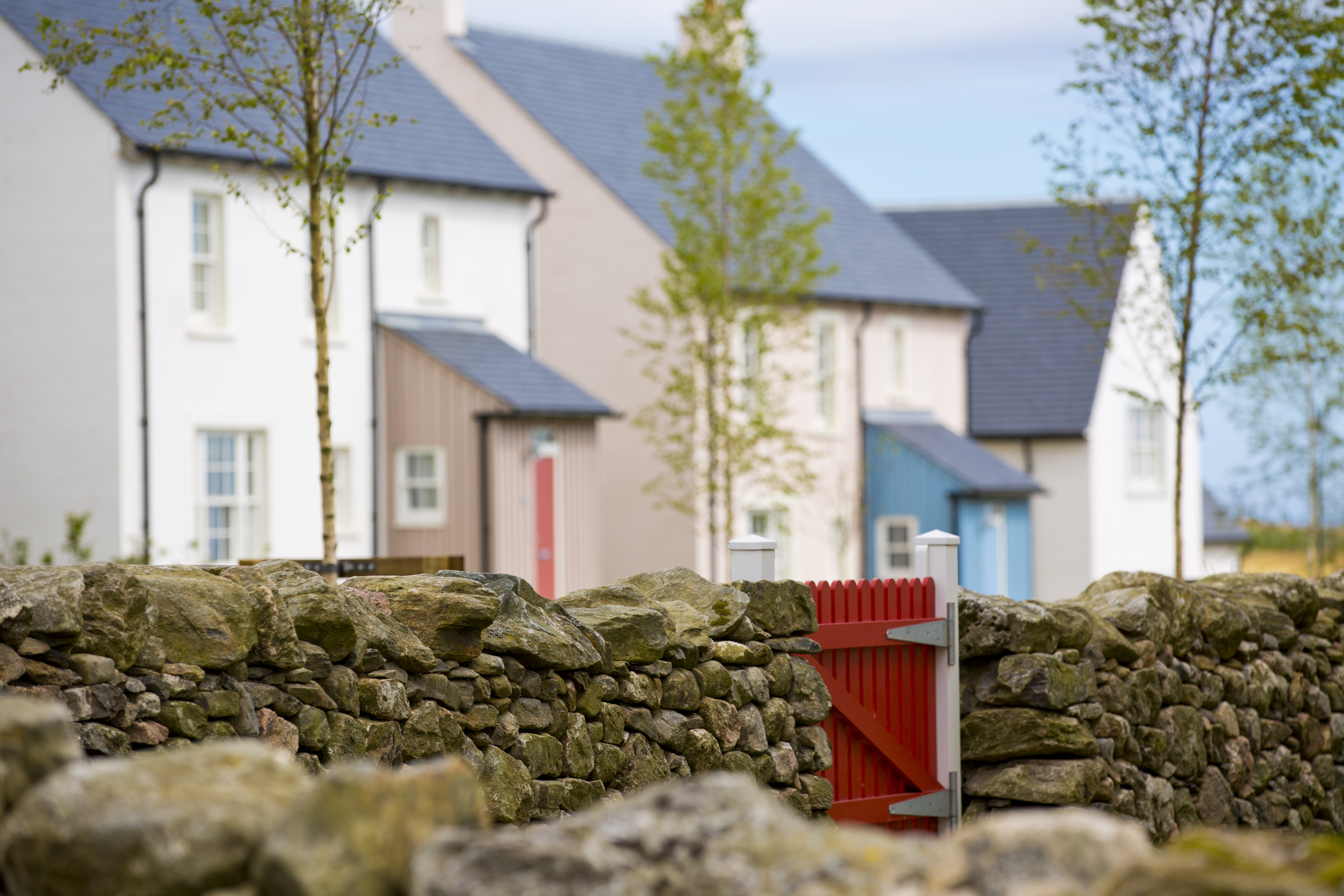
Greenlaw Road, Chapelton (August 2016)

The town is situated close to the A92. The A90 passes the town approximately 1 mile (1.6 km) to the west, but it is inaccessible as there is no junction. A central bus stop is served by an hourly bus to Aberdeen with a journey time of one hour. Alternatively, Chapelton's Park and Choose is located at the A92 0.5 miles from the eastern edge of the town. It is served by an hourly express bus service between Aberdeen and Perth.

The town does not have a railway station. The nearest, Portlethen, is 3.5 miles away.

=== Green Spaces ===
A variety of parks have been designed throughout the development and several are already built ranging from the more formal Hume Square, already home to the Bike Ride and other events and boasting cherry trees underplanted with bulbs. The newly created Liddell Park includes The Hut which is a community building and the first children's play area. Larger and more informal green parks such as Pheppie Park and Wolrige Gardens are situated towards the edge.

At the entrance to the town is a large country park and the community woodland, planted by new residents, forms a growing backdrop. The Chapelton Trail, designed on tracks and along the Causeymounth and Elsick House drives, is on offer to those who like countryside walks.

A new playground named after Tom Patey was opened in 2022.

=== Public Amenities ===
Chapelton is served by a bistro Teacake, The Lounge, a beauty and hair salon, and a nursery school. In addition, Brio Retirement Living's Landale Court offers a range of apartments and houses along with its Slate & Grain brasserie and bar. A further 10 businesses are located at the temporary container Park, The Boxes @ Chapelton, located opposite the Hut - the first community building.

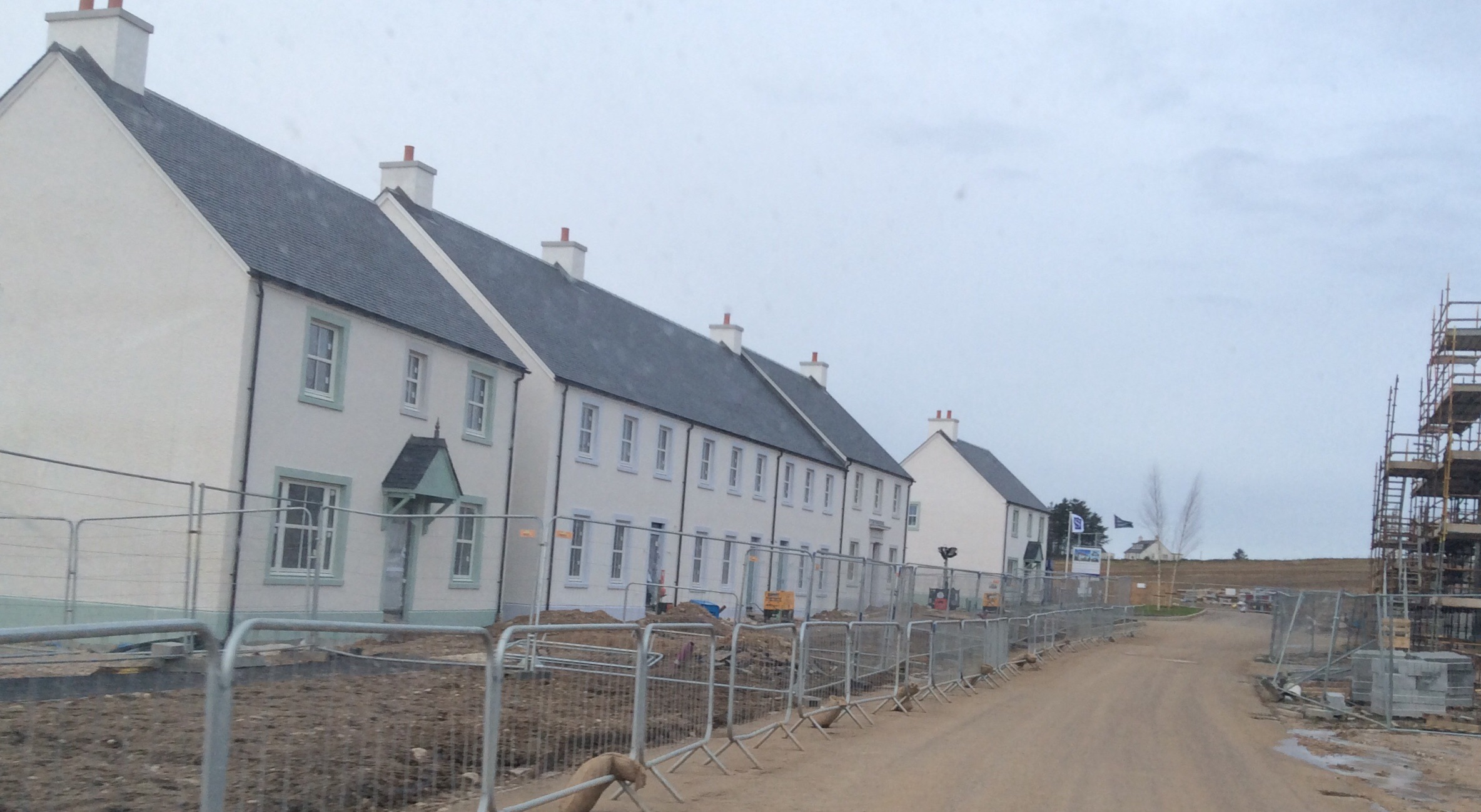
A row of terraced houses in Cairnhill, Chapelton (Jan 2015)

== Community ==
Chapelton community host an Annual Scarecrow competition through the month of August ‘Chapelton Scarecrow Festival’ since 2019.

The community also hosts a regular farmers market several times a year, and an annual popular 10km running event.

== See also ==
- Bannerman baronets
- Burn of Elsick
- Elsick House
- Elsick Mounth
