= Cookney =

Coordinates: 57°02′N 2°12′W

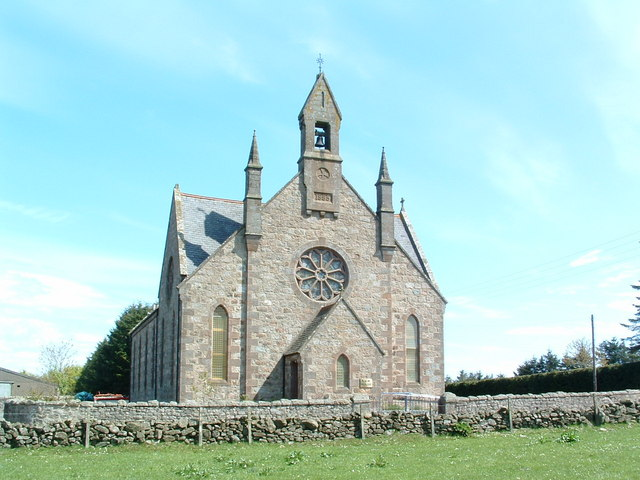
Cookney Church

Cookney is a hamlet in Aberdeenshire, Scotland in proximity to Netherley in the Mounth of the Grampian Highlands. The community is situated on a hilltop approximately 5 miles (8 km) northwest of Stonehaven, about 3 miles (5 km) northwest of the Bridge of Muchalls, and about 2 miles (3 km) west of Muchalls Castle. From Cookney a portion of the ancient route of the Causey Mounth is visible to the east near Whinward Farm, although the track is not truly recognizable from that distance. The Cookney Church is a prominent historic landmark of Cookney.

The Cookney Church was erected in the village in 1816 on lands owned by the Muchalls Castle Estate.

The new A90 road passes close by but there is no junction. Cookney Primary School was closed with pupils transferred to the new Newtonhill Primary School in 1969.

== Early history ==
While the original area was inhabited by the Picts, little is recorded until the Middle Ages. There is considerable history of the Episcopal churches of the local area, with some early facilities being part of proximate Muchalls Castle. A very early Episcopal church had been constructed within Muchalls Castle itself in the first quarter of the 17th century. Earlier ruined Episcopal churches also exist slightly to the east on historical lands of Muchalls Castle. Cookney Church is situated somewhat west on a high hill and within view of the ancient trackway of the Causey Mounth; moreover, the Causey Mounth trackway was constructed in medieval times to make passable this only available route across the coastal region of the Grampian Mounth from points south from Stonehaven to Aberdeen. This ancient drovers' road connected the River Dee crossing (where the present Bridge of Dee is situated) via Muchalls Castle and Stonehaven to the south. The route was that taken by William Keith, 7th Earl Marischal and the Marquess of Montrose when they led a Covenanter army of 9000 men in the first battle of the Civil War in 1639.

== See also ==
- Maryculter
- Red Moss
