= Burn of Pheppie =

Stream in Aberdeenshire, Scotland

Coordinates: 57.02064°N 2.15641°W

The Burn of Pheppie is an easterly flowing coastal stream in Aberdeenshire, Scotland that discharges to the North Sea immediately north of the village of Muchalls. Draining chiefly agricultural lands, this stream has a notable lack of turbidity and a pH level of approximately 8.02. Armouring of the stream bottom consists of pebbles, many of which are quartzite in composition, leading to a golden-green effect in some locations. Other nearby watercourses discharging to the North Sea include Burn of Elsick to the north and Burn of Muchalls to the south.

== History ==
The Burn of Pheppie is crossed by the ancient Causey Mounth road, which was built on high ground to make passable this only available medieval route from coastal points south to Aberdeen. This medieval land passage specifically connected the crossing of the River Dee (where the present Bridge of Dee is located) via Portlethen Moss, Muchalls Castle and Stonehaven to the south. The route was that taken by William Keith, 7th Earl Marischal and the Marquess of Montrose when they led a Covenanter army of 9000 men in the first battle of the Civil War in 1639.

== See also ==
- Causey Mounth
- Newtonhill
- Portlethen Moss
