= Saint Ternan's Church =

Coordinates: 57.02578°N 2.17417°W

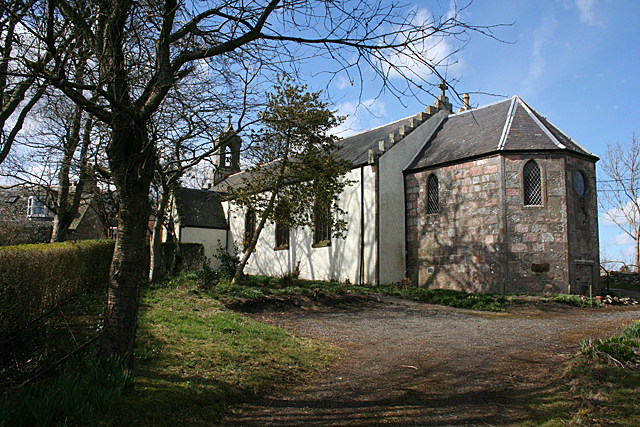
St Ternan's Church

Saint Ternan's Church is an Episcopal church in the Diocese of Brechin, near Muchalls in Aberdeenshire, Scotland.

The oldest church building in the Diocese of Brechin, it was built in 1831 as a simple country church on land granted by the owners of Muchalls Castle. The chancel, designed by Alexander Ellis, was added in 1870.

A very early Episcopal church had been constructed within Muchalls Castle itself in the first quarter of the 17th century. Earlier ruined Episcopal churches also exist slightly to the south on historical lands of Muchalls Castle. Saint Ternan's Church is situated along the ancient route of the Causey Mounth, which trackway was constructed in medieval times to make passable this only available route across the coastal region of the Grampian Mounth from points south from Stonehaven to Aberdeen. This ancient drovers' road specifically connected the River Dee crossing (where the present Bridge of Dee is situated) via Portlethen Moss, Muchalls Castle and Stonehaven to the south. The route was that taken by Earl Marischal and the Marquess of Montrose when they led a Covenanter army of 9,000 men in the first battle of the Wars of the Three Kingdoms in 1639.

== See also ==
- Burn of Pheppie
- Chapel of St Mary and St Nathalan
- Elsick House
