= May Craig =

May Craig may refer to:

- May Craig (actress) (1889–1972), Irish actress in Girl with Green Eyes
- May Craig (island), a small island off the coast of Aberdeenshire, Scotland
- May Craig (journalist) (1889–1975), American journalist
