= Elsick House =

Historic house in North-East Scotland

Coordinates: 57.043450°N 2.181000°W

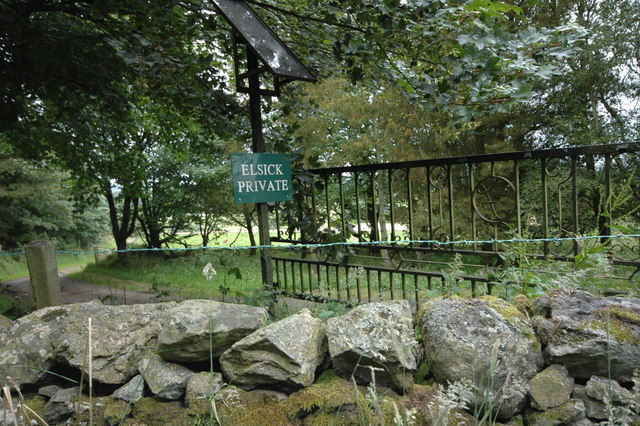
Entrance road to Elsick House

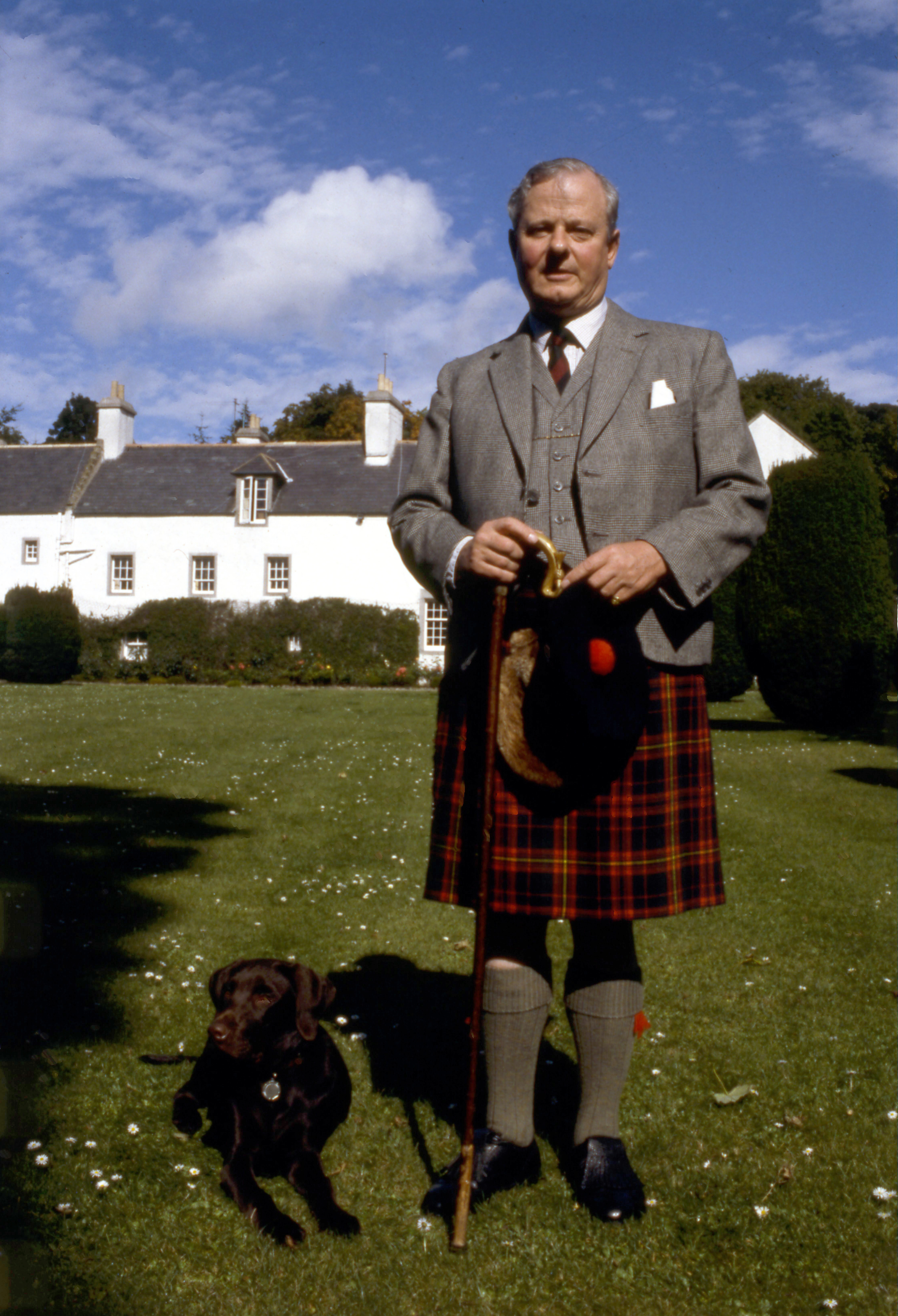
James Carnegie, 3rd Duke of Fife, in front of Elsick House (photograph by Allan Warren, 1984)

Elsick House is a historic house in Kincardineshire, North-East Scotland. It is situated in an agricultural area about two miles from the North Sea near the town of Newtonhill; the Elsick Estate has been in the Bannerman and Carnegie family since the 14th Century and is now open as an exclusive use venue for weddings and corporate events. The estate is situated within the watershed of the Burn of Elsick, a stream that traverses the estate. The house is located on the Elsick Estate (650 hectares (1,600 acres)), and is the present family seat of the Duke of Fife.

== Early area history ==
Elsick House is located near the ancient Causey Mounth trackway, which road was constructed in medieval times to make passable this only available route across the coastal region of the Grampian Mounth connecting points south of Stonehaven to Aberdeen. This ancient drovers' road specifically connected the River Dee crossing (where the present Bridge of Dee is situated) via Portlethen Moss, Muchalls Castle and Stonehaven to the south. The route was that taken by William Keith, 7th Earl Marischal and the Marquess of Montrose when they led a Covenanter army of 9000 men in the first battle of the Civil War in 1639.

== See also ==
- Cookney Church
- Bannerman baronets
- Chapelton of Elsick
