= Newtonhill =

Town in Aberdeenshire, Scotland

Coordinates: 57.032°N 2.150°W

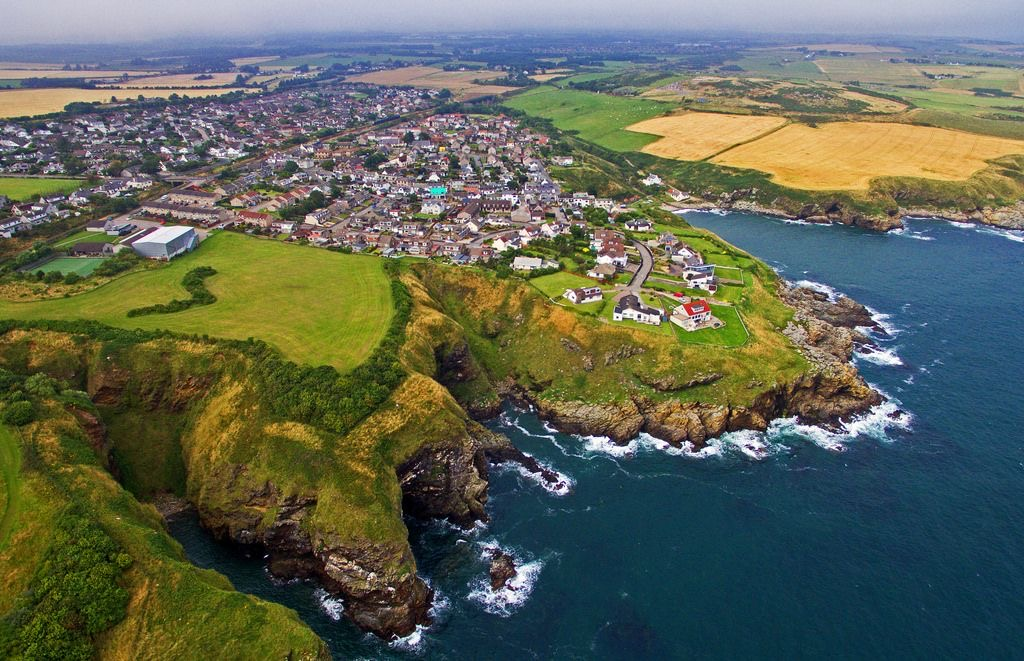

- Location within Aberdeenshire
- Population: 3,010 (2020)
- Council area: Aberdeenshire
- Lieutenancy area: Kincardineshire
- Country: Scotland
- Sovereign state: United Kingdom
- Post town: STONEHAVEN
- Postcode district: AB39
- Dialling code: 01569
- Police: Scotland
- Fire: Scottish
- Ambulance: Scottish
- UK Parliament: West Aberdeenshire & Kincardine
- Scottish Parliament: Aberdeen South and North Kincardine

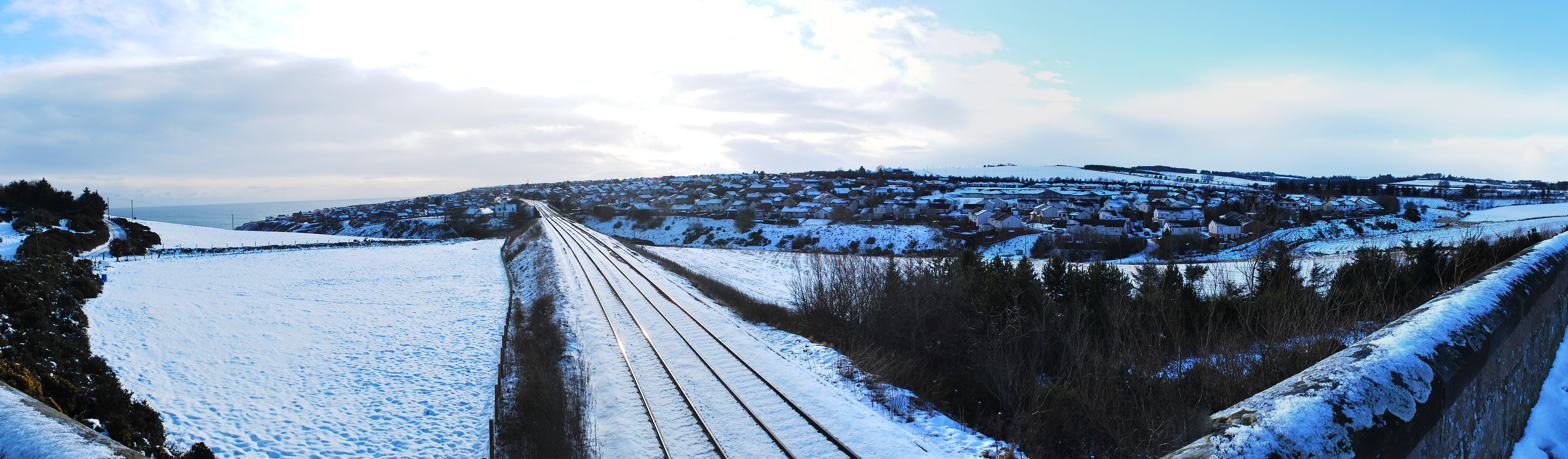
Newtonhill village in the snow taken from the railway bridge to the north of the village

Newtonhill is a village in Aberdeenshire (historically Kincardineshire), Scotland. It is popular due to its location just nine miles south of Aberdeen, within easy reach of Stonehaven and with views over the North Sea.

== History ==
The town was originally called Skateraw in the 17th century. Skateraw was a fishing village, and the older part of the village (still called Skateraw) between the railway line and the sea reflects that heritage, though nearly all of the old houses have been modernised and extended. An old smoke house is still visible on Skateraw Road, though it has been many years since it was in use. The village had a railway station which led to the change of name from Skateraw to Newtonhill but it was closed in 1956; the signal box was still in use until May 2019 and remnants of a platform can still be seen. A feasibility study received funding in May 2018 to study the possible reopening of the station.

In 1846, the first school in Skateraw (Newtonhill) was established by the Scottish Episcopal Church. The school was housed in a rented cottage No.18 Skateraw Village (Now 15 Skateraw Road). In 1855, due to the ruinous state of the school room, the church then established the school in St Michaels on Elsick Place, the current site of Newtonhill Church.

Newtonhill is in Kincardineshire, though local government re-organisation means that the local authority is Aberdeenshire Council.

In the 1880s, Skateraw pier was built on Skateraw Shore to accommodate larger fishing boats in the waters around Skateraw. In the early 1980s, the pier was demolished by the British army due to its deterioration.

== Fishing ==
The Annual Reports of the Fishery Board for Scotland provide an insight into the fishing in Skateraw in the years before the First World War. Already in 1900 the report states that "this village is now of no importance as a fishing station, but is becoming popular as a summer resort". The figures show that the situation did not improve.

Fishery Statistics

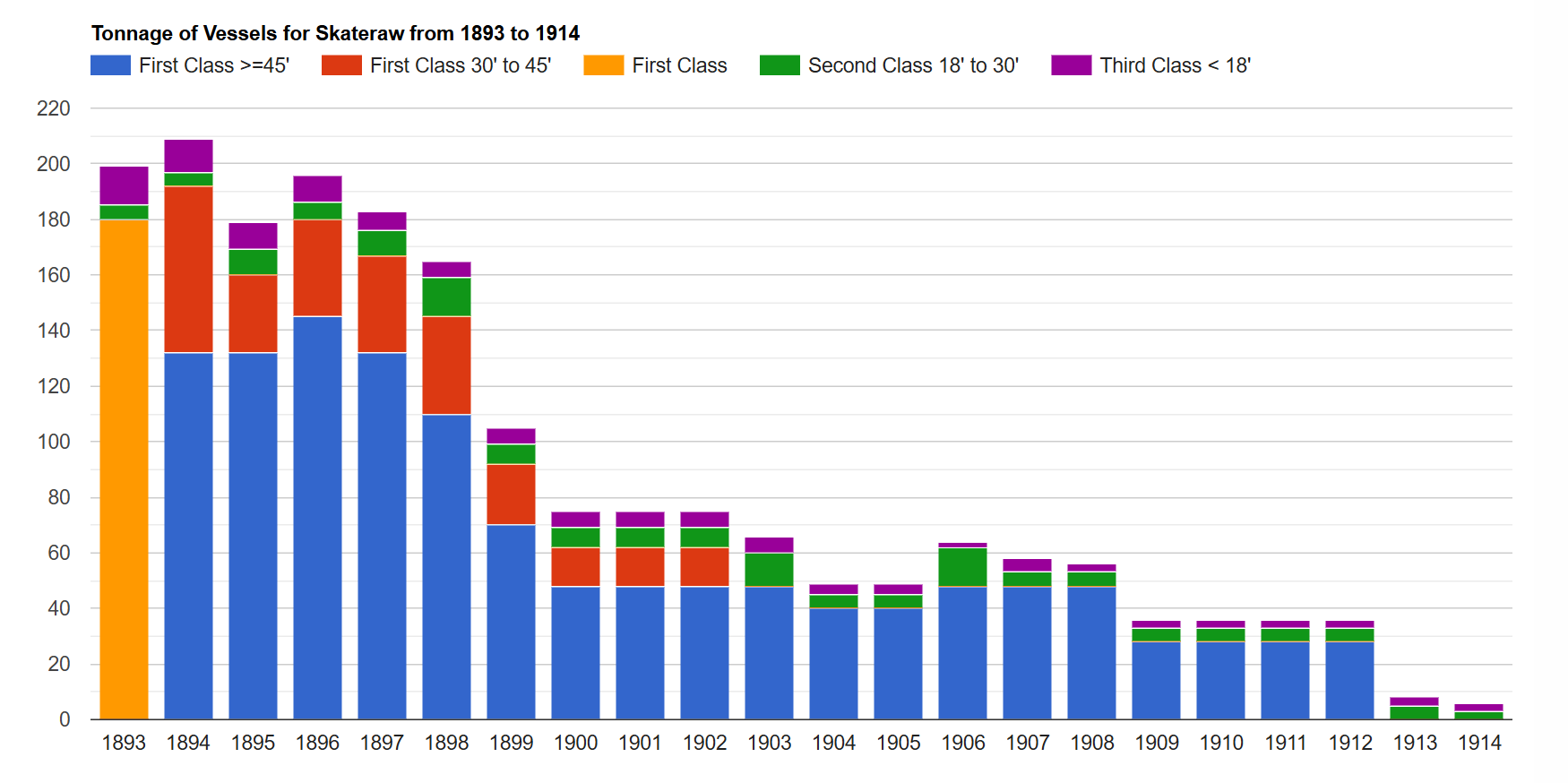
Tonnage of vessels

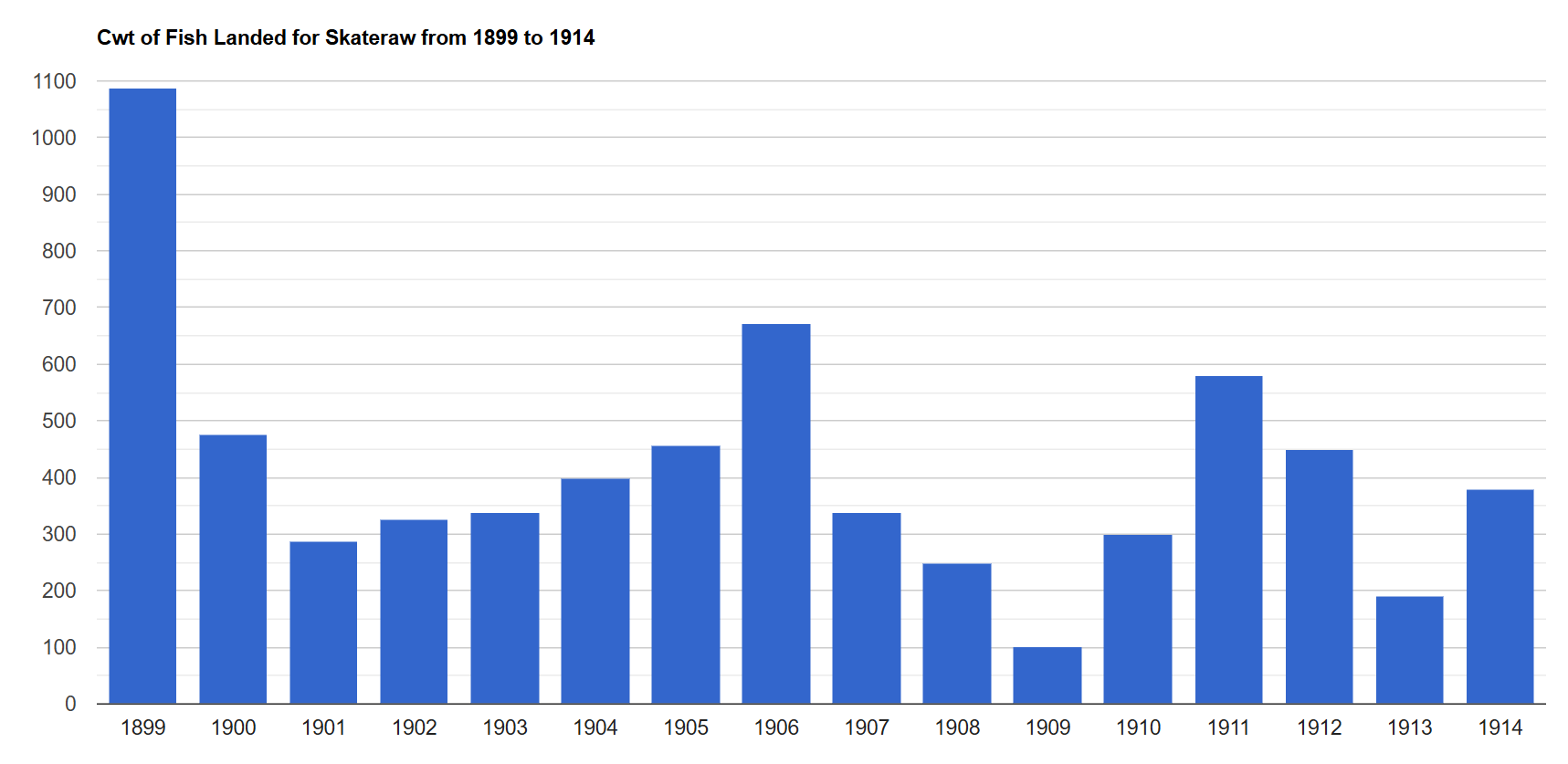
Cwt of fish landed

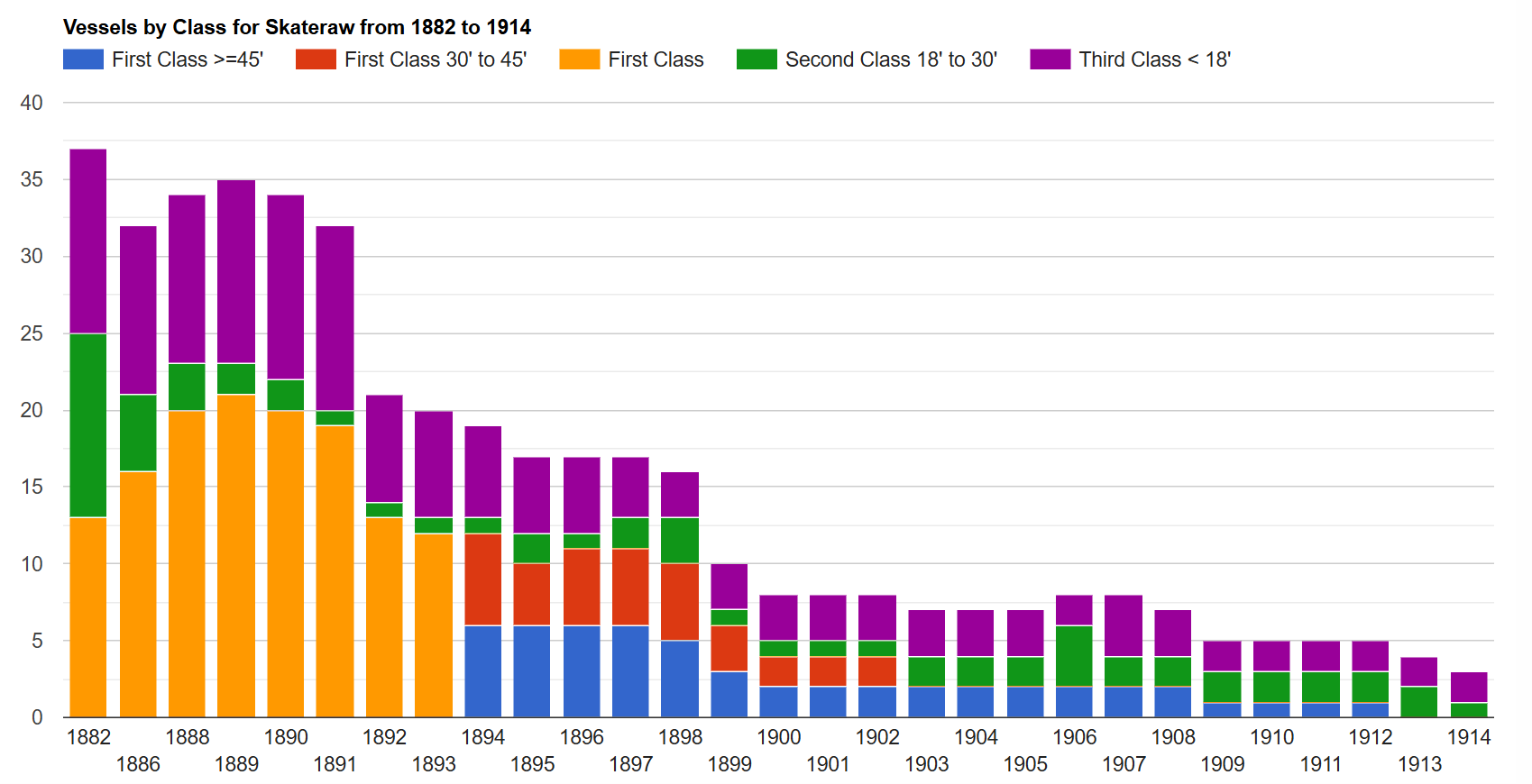
Vessels by class

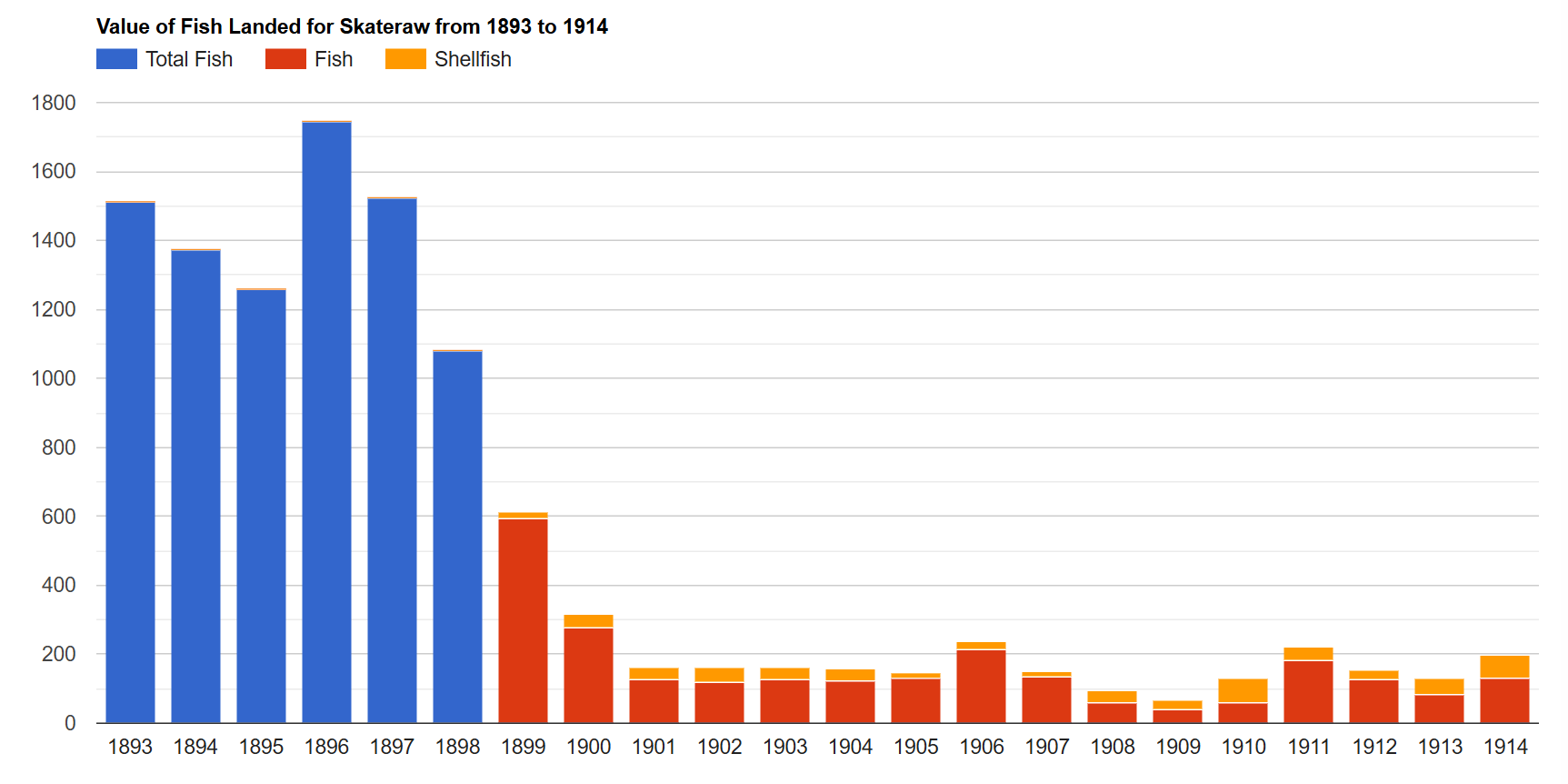
Value (£) of fish landed

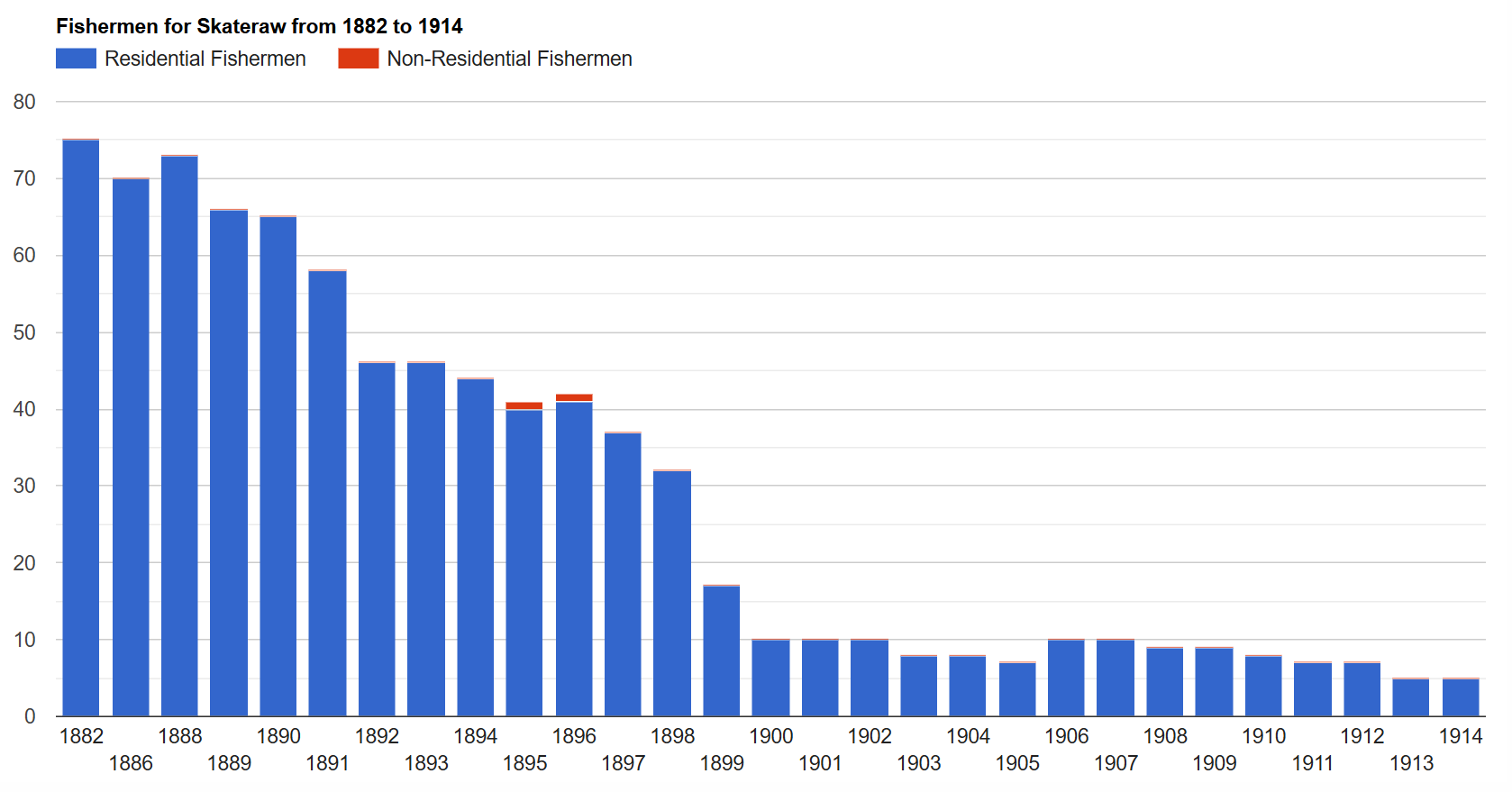
Fishermen

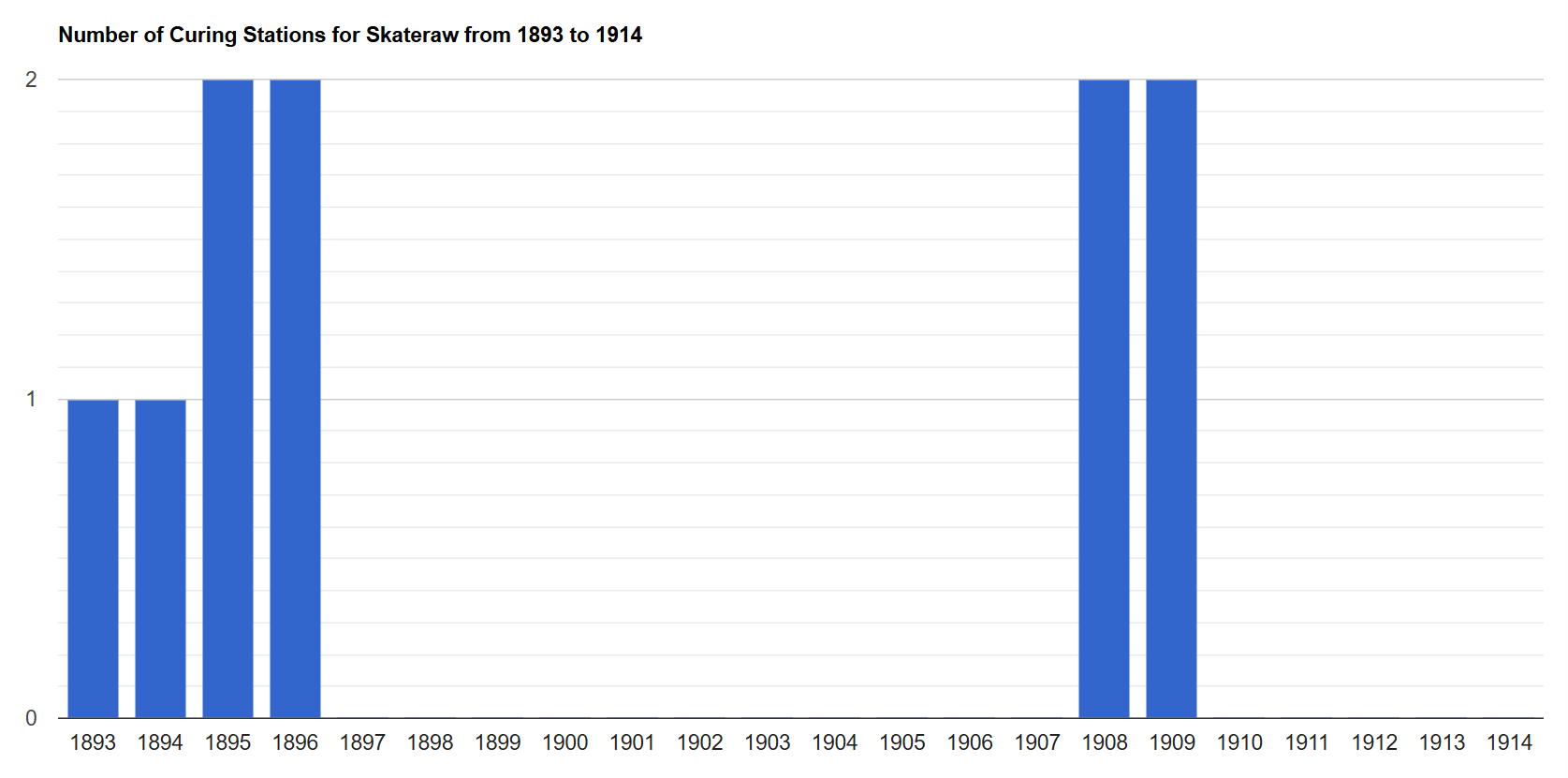
Number of curing stations

== Transport links ==
Newtonhill today is accessed by the A92 road and functions primarily as a commuter town to Aberdeen and other business hubs in the area. The town is also well served by buses run by Stagecoach Group providing regular services to Aberdeen, Stonehaven and Montrose. There are proposals to reopen Newtonhill railway station, on the main line to Aberdeen, which closed in 1956.

On 14 December 2015, the "park and choose" was opened to the west of the A92. It is served by the X7 Coastrider service. The facility, which also serves the nearby village of Chapelton, allowed two bus stops at the side of the A92 to be removed.

Ember serve Newtonhill as a prebooked stop on its E1 (Aberdeen- Edinburgh) and E17 (Aberdeen-Perth) routes.

== Community and amenities ==
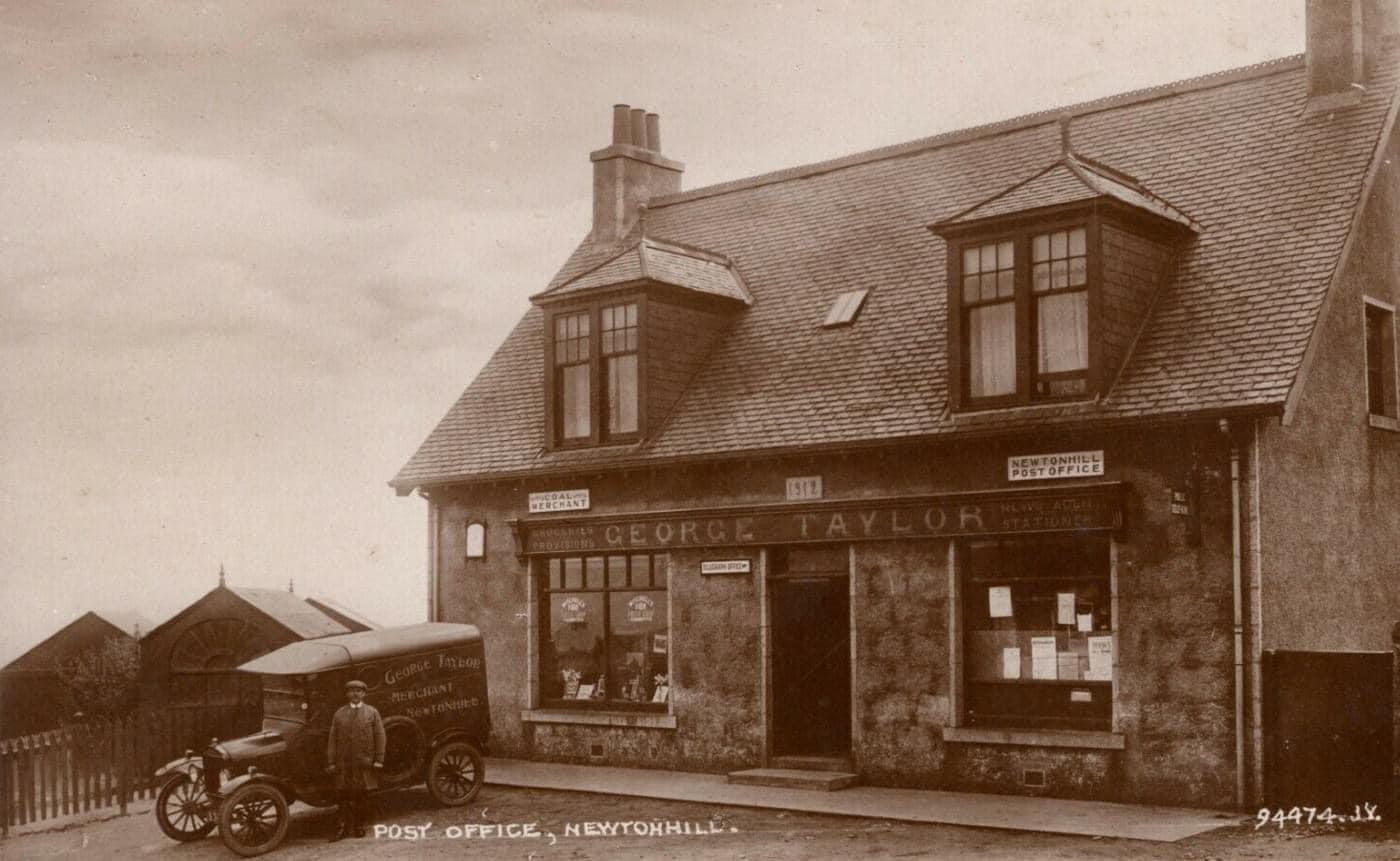
Newtonhill Post Office circa 1925 – now the Skateraw Store

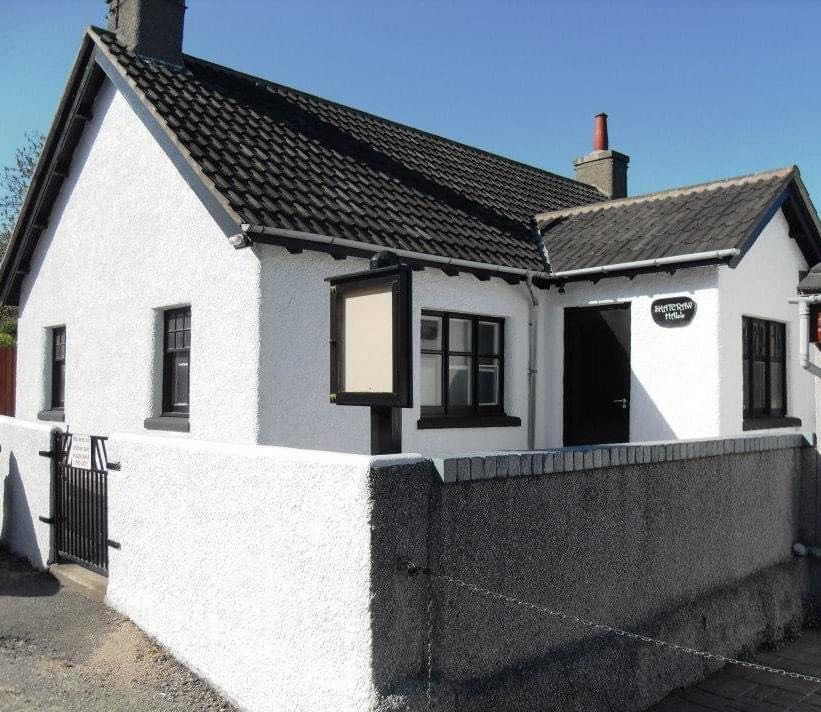
Skateraw Hall, built in the 1880s – pictured in 2013

Newtonhill has a successful Boys' Brigade chess team which has won the Scottish tournament many times and have won the British grand finals the most out of all British teams. There is an active community spirit in Newtonhill and many events are organised through the Newtonhill and District Village Association, with wider planning issues being discussed by the Community Council.

There are five commercial outlets: a Tesco Metro store, a coffee shop (the Skateraw Store), a pharmacy which also hosts a weekly post office, a curry house, and a Chinese takeaway. There are two pubs in the town, Quoiters Cafe Bar and the Newton Arms.

A community hall was built in the 1980s. Due to a demand for more space, it was expanded and renamed the Bettridge Centre in 2003. The Centre is run by elected local residents. Beside this centre is Newtonhill Library. There is also the Skateraw Hall built in the 1880s, originally provided for the residents when Newtonhill was a fishing village.

Newtonhill Primary School serves the town and surrounding hamlets of Muchalls and Cammachmore. It opened in April 1969 and had an initial roll of 144 pupils. It replaced Cairnhill and Cookney schools.

== Events ==
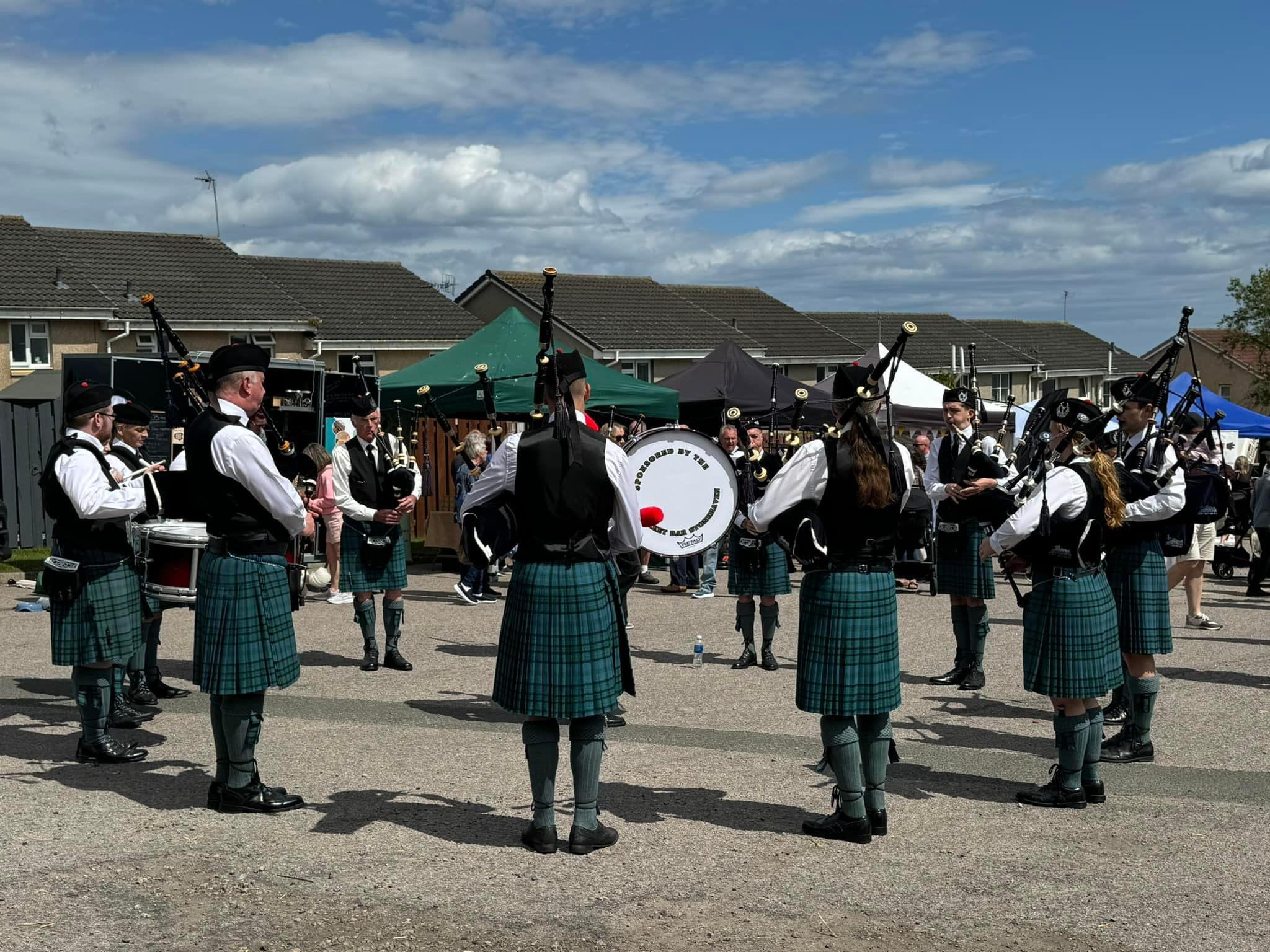
Dunnottar Pipes and Drums playing at the Skateraw Fair in 2024

The Skateraw Fair is held annually on the last Saturday in June with events leading up to the main event throughout the month. The Skateraw Fair originated before World War II as a small gala. The fair returned in 1977. In 1980, an official committee was established, and the fair was given the name "Skateraw Fair".

== Geography ==
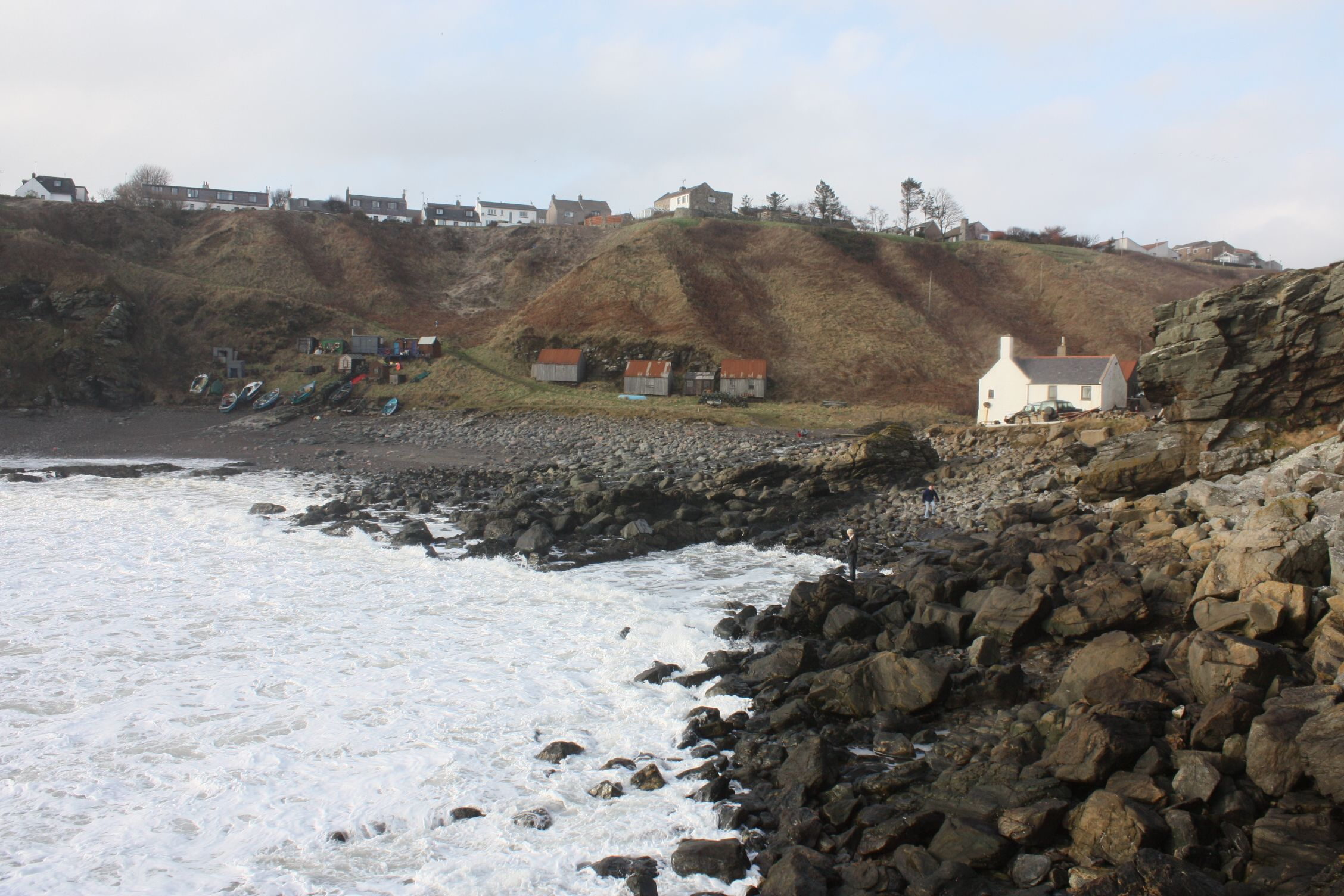
The Bay at Newtonhill, which features several caves

Newtonhill is located on the North-East coast of Scotland, approximately 9 miles south of Aberdeen and 6 miles north of Stonehaven.

The Burn of Elsick, which drains agricultural lands from the west, flows into the North Sea at Newtonhill. The White Wife is a rock formation which allows sea angling. Newtonhill also has a great scenic view of the cliffs looking on to the pebble shore, where fishing is still a custom to many.

== Notable people ==
- Ryan Sharp (born 1979), racing driver
- Alfie Stewart (born 2006), footballer
- Alistair Urquhart (1919–2016) Gordon Highlander captured by the Japanese in World War II – author of the biography The Forgotten Highlander

== See also ==
- Cammachmore
- Elsick House
- May Craig
- Chapelton, Aberdeenshire
