= Burn of Elsick =

Stream in Aberdeenshire, Scotland

Location
- Country: Scotland

Physical characteristics
- Mouth: North Sea
  - coordinates: 57.03312°N 2.14311°W

The Burn of Elsick is a coastal stream in Aberdeenshire, Scotland that discharges to the North Sea. This watercourse drains primarily agricultural lands and enters the North Sea at Newtonhill.

== History ==
The Burn of Elsick flows under the Causey Mounth, an ancient drovers road dating from circa 1100 AD, which track is extant as a hiking footpath. The Causey Mounth was built on high ground to make it passable and was the only available medieval route from coastal points south to Aberdeen. The route connected the crossing of the River Dee (where the present Bridge of Dee is located) via Portlethen Moss, Muchalls Castle and Stonehaven to the south. The route was that taken by William Keith, 7th Earl Marischal and the Marquess of Montrose when they led a Covenanter army of 9000 men in the first battle of the Civil War in 1639. Standing above the burn's course is an historic home, Elsick House, owned by the Duke of Fife. The historic Gillybrands coaching inn and present day farm is situated on the banks of the Burn of Elsick.

A salmon fisherman's bothy stands perched above the cascading mouth of the burn. In Victorian times the local area was a prolific source of salmon, but overfishing to serve the expanding human population has severely reduced the fishing stocks.

== See also ==
- Burn of Pheppie
- Muchalls Castle
- Saint Ternan's Church
