= Causey Mounth =

Ancient drovers' road in Aberdeenshire, Scotland

Coordinates: 57.03919°N 2.16439°W

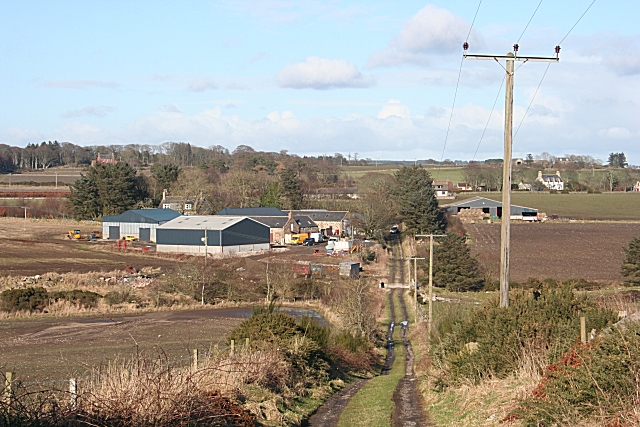
Causey Mounth at Gillybrands

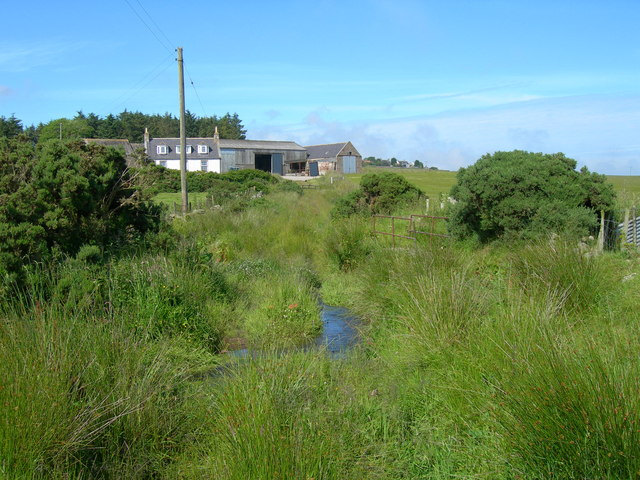
Causey Mounth at Nether Cairnhill

The Causey Mounth is an ancient drovers' road over the coastal fringe of the Grampian Mountains in Aberdeenshire, Scotland. This route was developed around the 12th century AD as the main highway between Stonehaven and Aberdeen, and it continued to function as the principal route connecting these two cities until the mid-20th century, when construction of the modern A90 road occurred in this area. There are extant paved and usable sections of this road over part of the alignment; however, many parts of the ancient route are no more than footpaths, and in some cases the road has vanished into agricultural fields. Constructed in the Middle Ages, the Causey Mounth was created as an elevated rock causeway to span many of the boggy areas such as the Portlethen Moss. A considerable portion of the alignment of the Causey Mounth is illustrated on the UK Ordnance Survey map, although a large fraction of the route cannot be navigated by a conventional passenger vehicle (particularly at the crossing of the Burn of Pheppie).

== History ==
A number of prehistoric megalithic monuments, such as the Old Bourtreebush stone circle, lie along the Causey Mounth. As late as the Early Middle Ages, the Mounth, or easternmost range of the Grampian Mountains, posed a formidable terrestrial barrier isolating the northeast of Scotland from the Scottish Lowlands. This obstacle, combined with the local bogs, may have been a factor in re-routing the Romans' coastal march northward, for the farthest known major coastal Roman encampment (Raedykes) in the east of Scotland lies exactly at the southern extremity of the Causey Mounth. By the twelfth century AD, construction of the Causey Mounth had begun to connect these two regions of highlands and lowlands. The Causey Mounth was traversed by the Marquess of Montrose and William Keith, 7th Earl Marischal, when they commanded a Covenanter army of 9,000 men in the first battle of the Civil War in 1639.

== Detailed alignment ==
The route was specifically designed to connect the coastal portion of Stonehaven to a crossing of the River Dee at the southern edge of Aberdeen. Stonehaven was most noted in the Middle Ages for the fortress of Dunnottar Castle, controlling land and sea movements of military might from its rugged promontory jutting into the North Sea. This fortress, along with Cowie Castle at the north of Stonehaven, effectively controlled all coastal land and sea movements to the north. Proceeding north from Cowie Castle, the Causey Mounth crosses the Burn of Muchalls at the Bridge of Muchalls and thence proceeds northward past Muchalls Castle. The trackway passes the ruins of the Episcopal Chapels, dating to 1624 situated on lands of the Muchalls Castle Estate, and thence northerly beside the present day Saint Ternan's Church, which is the successor facility to the ruined chapels.

From there the alignment crosses the Burn of Pheppie in an agricultural area and then crosses a bridge over the Burn of Elsick at Gillybrands, slightly southeast of Elsick House. After crossing through the boggy Portlethen Moss (which historically had a much larger extent than at present), the route passes west of a massive megalithic standing stone.

== See also ==
- Cairn O' Mounth
- Elsick House
- Elsick Mounth
- Burn of Elsick
- Hare Moss
