= Muchalls Castle =

Castle in Scotland

Coordinates: 57.0175°N 2.1798°W

- Aberdeenshire, Scotland
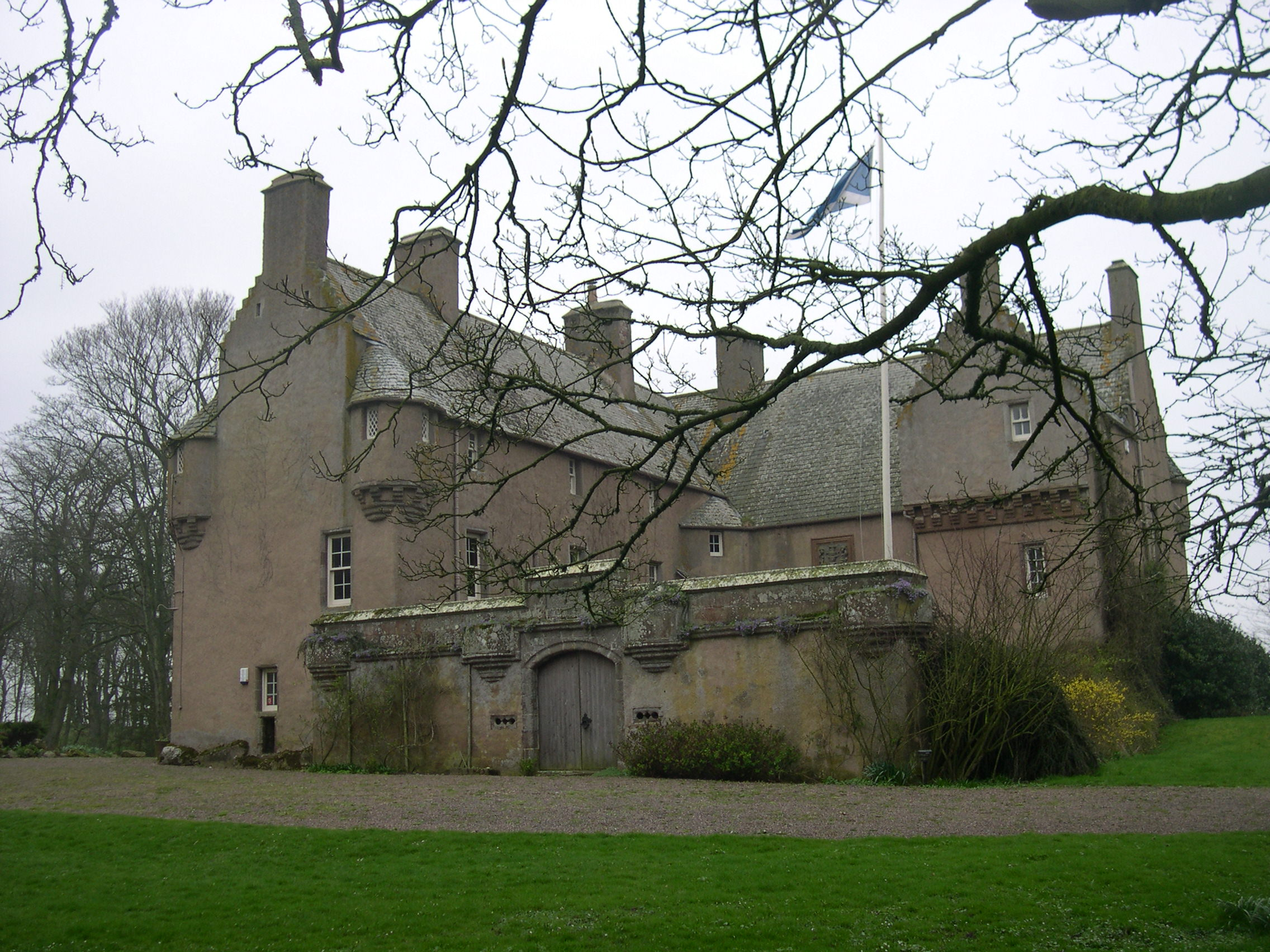
- Muchalls Castle

Site information
- Open to the public: No
- Condition: In use

Site history
- Built: 1300
- Built by: Frasers of Muchalls
- In use: Present
- Materials: Stone

Muchalls Castle stands overlooking the North Sea in the countryside of Kincardine and Mearns, Aberdeenshire, Scotland. The lower course is a well-preserved Romanesque, double-groined 13th-century tower house structure, built by the Frasers of Muchalls. Upon this structure, the 17th-century castle was begun by Alexander Burnett of Leys and completed by his son, Sir Thomas Burnett, 1st Baronet, in 1627. The Burnetts of Leys built the remaining four-storey present-day castle.

One of the most interesting castles in North-East Scotland, according to noted architectural historian Nigel Tranter, it is designed in the classic L style with a further extension wing at the west end. Muchalls Castle entered national history in 1638 when a seminal Covenanter gathering took place there, precedent the English Civil War.

The plasterwork ceilings of the principal drawing rooms are generally regarded as among the three finest examples of plasterwork ceilings in Scotland. These adornments date to 1624 and are in virtually perfect condition. They consist of heraldry of the Burnett of Leys family, along with heraldry of relations and friends intermixed with biblical iconography. The overmantel of the Great Hall fireplace features the arms of King James VI flanked by impressive egyptianesque figures.

== Middle Ages origins ==
The lower course of this L-plan castle is the original 14th-century ground level of the Clan Fraser tower house. On this level are a dungeon, a guard room, storerooms, a chamber for merchants and visitors waiting to see the Laird, and a medieval kitchen. In the medieval kitchen, the interior wall is over five metres thick, accommodating a hidden staircase and affording bearing strength to support the upper levels. A long hall passageway was constructed as a barrel vaulted design. The dungeon is noted for its small window and still has the large steel hinges to which the dungeon door would have attached. The medieval kitchen has its original 14th-century flagstones; moreover, this room features a large walk-in fireplace with a secret spiral staircase that servants would have used in medieval times to carry meals to the higher levels. (Servants at that time would have not been allowed on the main staircases used by the nobility who dwelt in the castle.) Ownership of the castle and lands passed to the Hays in the 15th century probably associated with the same real estate transaction of the lands of Ury in AD 1413.

== Seventeenth-century reconstruction by the Burnetts of Leys ==
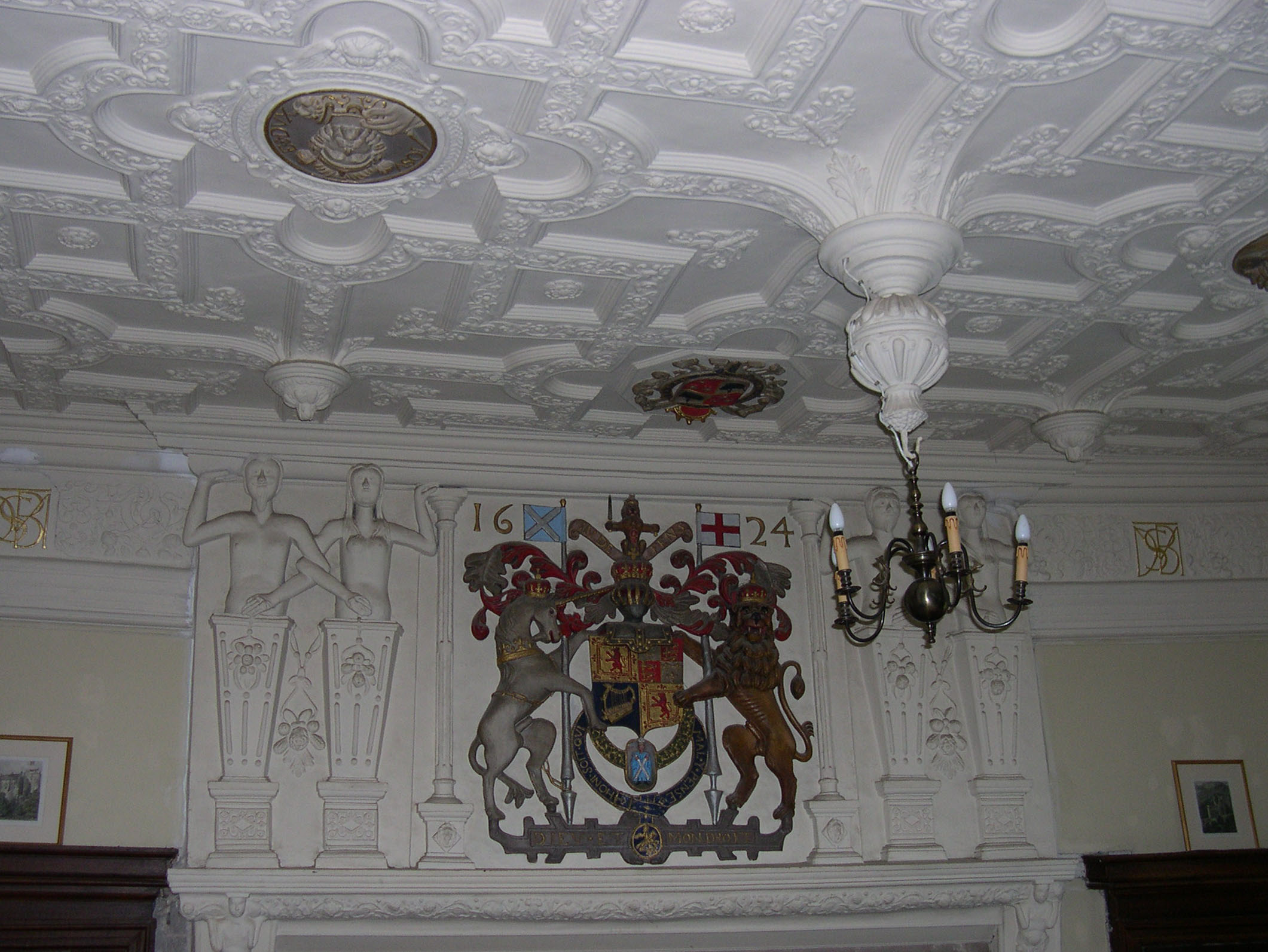
King James VI Arms in the Great Hall

The second floor level (referred to as the first floor in Scotland) is erected over the intact Middle Ages ground-level structure. Prominent exterior features are: a set of well-sculpted corbelled turrets; massive ranges of chimneys: a curtain-walled entrance courtyard with two sets of triple gun loops flanking the entrance arch; a subterranean crypt; and well-preserved 17th-century high-stone walled terraced gardens. The bartizans render interesting interior features in numerous of the bedrooms, providing interesting circular nooks with small lookout windows strategically placed at the upper building corners. There are numerous original arrow slits that indicate the original defensive nature of the structure; some of these arrow slits penetrate exterior walls that are over a metre thick. There are a number of crow-stepped gables associated with large chimneys at building endpoints. The castle itself is an A listed historical building; however, there are three further listed structures on the castle grounds, including a fine stone stable and a 17th-century dovecote.

The next level includes most of the principal reception rooms, including the Great Hall, the Ladies' Drawing Room and the Gentlemen's Study. These reception rooms are the main locations of the elaborate plasterwork; in fact, the ceilings of these three rooms are totally covered in original 17th-century plasterwork with heraldic coats of arms, biblical figures and other historical figures. The great hall fireplace has an original plasterwork overmantel featuring egyptianesque caryatid figures and the King James Arms. One can walk erect inside the fireplace and conduct a small meeting inside with bench seating built in. The firebox also hosts the Laird's Lug, a secret listening system allowing the Laird to overhear conversations in the Great Hall from his suite above.

The third level consists of a number of bedrooms: The Laird's Bedroom, The Priest's Bedroom, The Queen's Bedroom and The Queen's Winter Bedroom. The Queen naturally had a very elegant room in case she were to visit; in fact, she had a Winter Bedroom for inclement weather. Each of the bedrooms has a fireplace, as do some of the bathrooms. The bathrooms are a Victorian modification of what would have been dressing rooms in the 17th century.

Several generations of the Burnett of Leys family lived in Muchalls Castle. Later residents included James Robertson, Baron Robertson, President of the Scottish Court of Session, and Geraldine Simpson (née Pringle), heiress to the Pringle knitting fortune.

== Role in Covenanters' history ==
Muchalls Castle was the location of an important turning point in the Reformation in Scotland. In 1638 at Edinburgh signatories to a Covenant opposed the imposition of the Episcopal liturgical system then backed by the King. Aberdeen was one of the last holdouts to confirm this covenant, its opposition led by six scholars at Marischal College and King's College remembered as the Aberdeen doctors. Sir Thomas Burnett of Leys, Laird of Muchalls Castle, along with James Graham, 1st Marquess of Montrose, Dickson, Henderson, Lord Coupar, the Master of Forbes and others formed a delegation of Covenanters to approach the doctors. The doctors offered the Cup of Bon Accord to the Covenanters and had laid out an elaborate banquet; however, very dramatically, the Covenanters refused the Cup, stating they would not meet until the doctors had signed the Covenant. The doctors were very disturbed and composed a list of queries, demanding the Covenanters' response. Muchalls Castle was the site of the Covenanters' meeting where they drew up their plucky and learned response to the doctors. From this confrontation and other concomitant events, Charles I unexpectedly made sweeping reforms and concessions to the Covenanters including revocation of the Service Book and Canons, repeal of the Perth Articles and enjoined subscription to Craig's Negative Confession of 1580, a document condemning papal errors.

== Victorian period to 20th century ==
Ownership of Muchalls Castle passed from the Burnett of Leys family about 1882. A prominent owner of the castle in late Victorian times was James Robertson, Baron Robertson, Lord Advocate of Scotland.

== Policies and estate ==
The castle is perched near the apex of a large knoll overlooking the North Sea with a forest policy (woodland surrounding a large estate) of very old sycamore, elm and beech trees forming the northern and eastern policy boundaries. These trees form a canopy attaining 50 metres in height, and are the domain of rookeries of crow and jackdaw. There is a population of several hundred of these birds, which are commonly associated with other Scottish castles; in fact, the current owners have purchased a tangent northern parcel, which is known on historic maps as "Crow Woods" and is a similar forest of mature trees that house crow and jackdaw flocks.

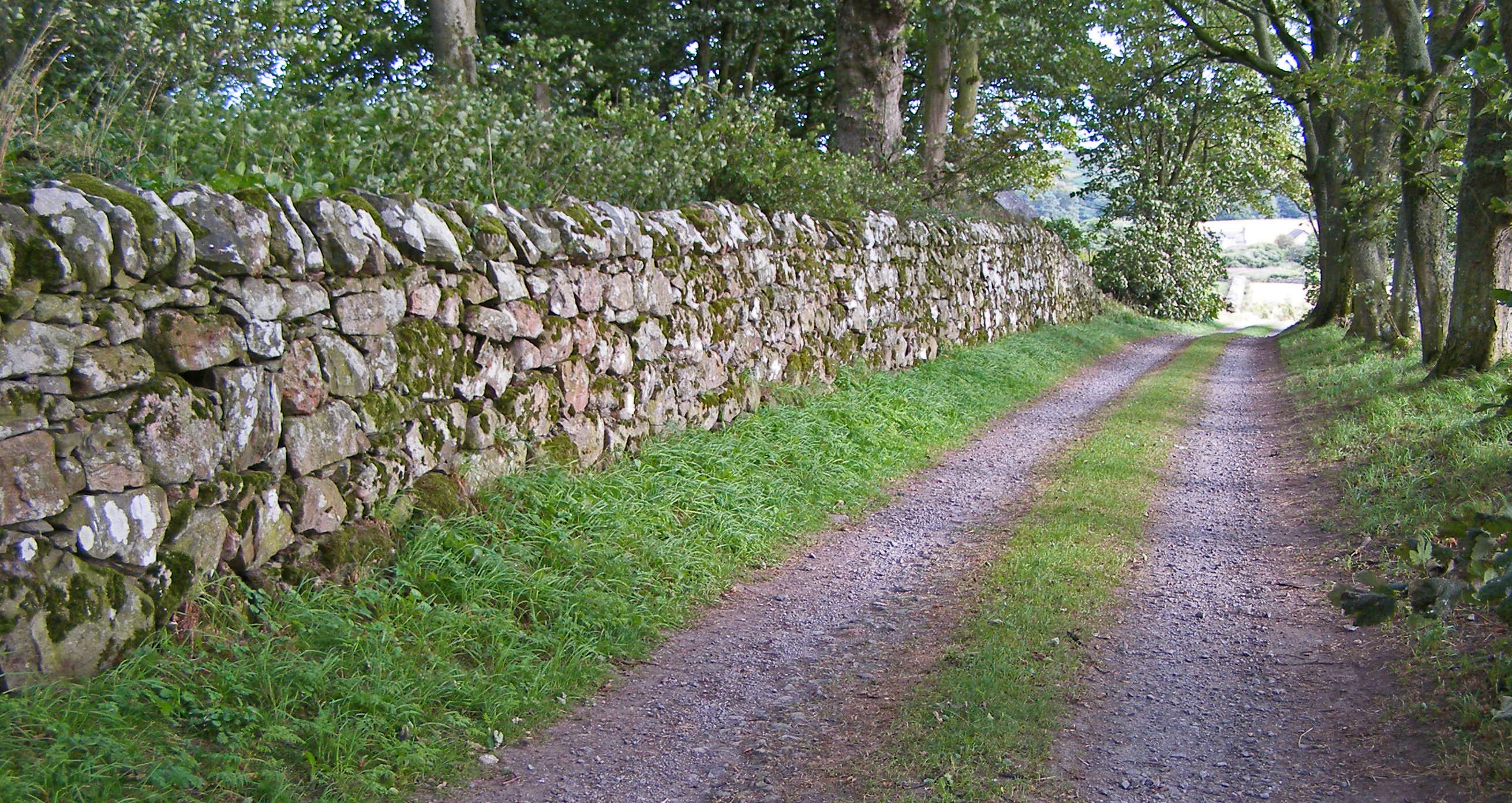
14th-century drystone wall at Muchalls Castle, Scotland

The south-eastern, southern, and western exposures have a thinner lower woodland policy, historically to allow free viewing of the North Sea and expansive valley views to the south and west. The principal gardens are situated in a series of declining terraces on the western side of the castle. These gardens were studied by a historical landscape architect in 2001 and determined to be the original early 17th-century design, including enclosing drystone walls. Further evidence of the original design period is manifested by a subtle pattern in the western lawn nearest the castle, which has been documented to be undulations echoing an elaborate subsurface stonework pattern, a hallmark of the 17th-century garden plan. On the southern lawn, there is a rare species of tree known as the weeping elm. This specimen is one of the oldest in Scotland, measuring a height of 12 metres. There are a total of seven principal lawns summing up into an area of 52,300 square feet (4,860 m^{2}).

Further there are a total of five agricultural fields as part of the castle estate, which are managed to accommodate cattle, sheep, and crops of wheat, barley, and hay. The castle is accessed via a private drive of about 3/4 mile (1.2 kilometres) long, which runs across the castle estate. One of the most intriguing discoveries of the 1990s was a hewn slab about two metres wide that spans a burn running along the southern portion of the estate. This slab had not been recorded on any of the historic maps from the most recent 200 years, but is the exact width needed to accommodate a carriage. This discovery was used to support the theory espoused by the present owners that the original castle access was from the south, and not the west as shown on maps of the last two centuries, and resulted in securing council approval to reconstruct the ancient approach as the main access drive.

== Area setting ==
Muchalls Castle is perched on high ground with a commanding view of the North Sea less than 1/2 mile (800 metres) distant. It lies on the ancient Causey Mounth road linking Stonehaven to Aberdeen via the Portlethen Moss. Muchalls Castle has sweeping views to the south and east of a valley that was the northernmost point of the Roman army's advance into the Scottish Highlands. The Romans built a major encampment Raedykes about three miles (five kilometres) south-east, which has yielded many interesting artefacts.

In nearby Stonehaven is Stonehaven Tolbooth, where Episcopal clergy were imprisoned for conducting services at the chapel on the Muchalls Castle estate. Other notable structures nearby that have historical links to Muchalls Castle are Fetteresso Castle, Dunnottar Castle, Crathes Castle and Monboddo House, the home of James Burnett, Lord Monboddo, the father of modern historical linguistics and a pre-evolutionary thinker.(Hobbs, 2002)

== See also ==
- Saint Ternan's Church
