= Auchenblae =

Village in Aberdeenshire, Scotland

Auchenblae: Scottish Gaelic: Achadh nam Blàth
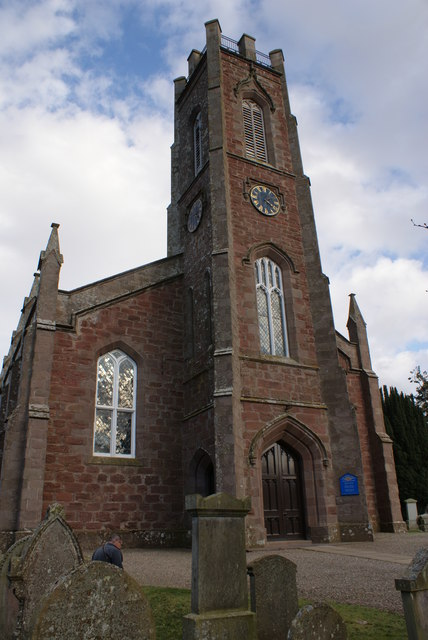

- Location within Aberdeenshire
- Population: 520 (2020)
- OS grid reference: NO7278
- Council area: Aberdeenshire
- Lieutenancy area: Kincardineshire
- Country: Scotland
- Sovereign state: United Kingdom
- Post town: LAURENCEKIRK
- Postcode district: AB30
- Dialling code: 01561
- Police: Scotland
- Fire: Scottish
- Ambulance: Scottish
- UK Parliament: West Aberdeenshire and Kincardine
- Scottish Parliament: Angus North and Mearns

Auchenblae (/ˌɔːxənˈbleɪ/, Scots pronunciation: [ɑxənˈbɫe], Scottish Gaelic: Achadh nam Blàth) is a village in the Kincardine and Mearns area of Aberdeenshire, formerly in Kincardineshire, Scotland. The village was known for its weavers, a whisky distillery and the annual Paldie's Fair horse market.

== Etymology ==
The name is a derivation from the Gaelic for "Field of Flowers" possibly due to the growing of flax in bygone times. Several spelling variations have historically been used, including Auchinblae, Auchinblay and Auchynbleay.

== Geography ==
Auchenblae is located in the valley of the Luther Water, approximately 24 miles south of Aberdeen and 5 miles north of Laurencekirk. Gilbert’s Hill, to the southeast, is home to the village war memorial, while Black Hill rises on the west side. The Luther Water flows north to south along the western edge of the village, joined within the settlement by two smaller burns, the Hodden Burn and Burnie Shag. The High Street winds down the hill to Monboddo Street and then climbs steeply again toward St. Palladius' Chapel.

== History ==
Auchenblae developed as two separate settlements, Fordoun and Auchenblae, that merged in the latter half of the 19th century. The older settlement of Fordoun was centred on Fordoun Parish Church in the south of the current village which has been a religious site since the 7th century. The original village of Auchenblae makes up the north of the current village. Auchenblae is recorded from the 16th century and was significantly enlarged in 1770 by a planned development to house mill workers. After the two settlements were linked by the development of Monboddo Street including the current village hall, the combined settlement came to be known as Auchenblae. Note that the nearby contemporary village of Fordoun was originally named Fordoun Station and grew around the train station that was opened in 1849 to serve the historic villages of Auchenblae and Fordoun.

=== Pre-Christian history ===
The land around Auchenblae has been inhabited for thousands of years. Some of the earliest local evidence of human habitation is a pit alignment found at Pittengardner (located between Auchenblae and Fordoun). Based on its similarity to excavated pit alignments at Crathes, the feature has been tentatively dated as Mesolithic. A later, possibly Iron Age, settlement was found at the same site consisting of at least 12 timber round-houses.

The recorded history of Scotland begins with the arrival of the Roman Empire in the 1st century. In 82 AD, Gnaeus Julius Agricola invaded the northeast of Scotland and established a chain of fortifications close to the Highland Line. A Roman marching camp, referred to as the West Camp, may have been located at Fordoun Mains (approx. 1.5 miles south of Auchenblae). The location of the camp was identified in the 18th century with detailed measurements taken by Rev. Dr. Leslie in 1799, however by this point very little evidence remained of the camp. By 1893, the camp earthworks had been completely levelled for farming and the most recent survey found no evidence of the camp other than inconclusive cropmarks.

=== The Parish of Fordoun ===
The church of Fordoun was consecrated by David de Bernham, Bishop of St Andrews in 1244.

The parsonage and resources of the Fordoun church were annexed to St Andrews cathedral priory as a gift from Robert the Bruce in completion of a vow he had made at Bannockburn. The annexation was completed at some point after 1329 when a commission was established to review and ratify the grant. The priory maintained its right to appoint the vicar of the parish until the reformation. By the fifteenth century, the church and the relics of St. Palladius continued to attracted a steady flow of pilgrims.

The lands of Fordoun were granted to John Beaton by King James IV in 1506-7 in thanks to his father, David Beaton's service as Treasurer of Scotland.

Fordoun was granted the status of Burgh of barony by Queen Mary I in 1554. The status was granted in part due to Mary's friendship with Fordoun's landowner Robert Beaton. Burgh status gave Fordoun the right to erect a market cross and hold weekly markets, elect bailies and hold an annual fairs on St Palladius day (which became the Paldy Fair).

=== 17 to 19th centuries ===
The current parish church was built between 1827 and 1829 by John Smith. The church on high ground above the Luther Water was built next to an older chapel dedicated to St. Palladius and was formerly known as Fordoun Parish Church. The location of the older chapel, known as at Kirkton of Fordoun was the birthplace of the chronicler John of Fordun (before 1360 – c. 1384) and has been a religious site since the 7th century. The bones of St Palladius were brought to Auchenblae. There is a Pictish cross slab, the Fordoun Stone, in the kirk's vestibule. In the graveyard is the ancient ruin of St Palladius' Chapel and there is a memorial to Scotland's first Protestant martyr George Wishart, born at Mains of Pittarrow in the old parish of Fordoun and burnt at the stake under the orders of Cardinal Beaton in St Andrews. The memorial was erected in 1850.

==== Growth of Auchenblae ====
Auchenblae began as a small hamlet immediately to the north of Fordoun, it is documented from as early as 1506 when feus were granted by the Abbot of Aberbrothock.

Auchenblae did not grow significantly until the end of the 18th century when the population grew rapidly from twelve families in 1795 to three hundred people by 1810. The growth of the village coincided with the construction of a flax spinning mill by David Kinnear in 1796 that created employment for forty people, mainly women and children. The mill was constructed at the south end of what is now the Den park and was powered by the Luther Water. At the turn of the century, Kinnear acquired a permanent feu to the land was mill was built on from the Earl of Kintore.

==== Paldy Fair ====
The Paldy Fair, named in honour of St Palladius, was an annual cattle and horse fair held until the mid 19th century which at its peak was the largest fair in the Mearns. The Fair began on the first Tuesday of July (close to St Palladius's feast day of 6 July) and continued for four days, with Tuesday for sheep; Wednesday for homemade fabrics, Thursday for cattle and Friday for horses. On Thursdays, up to 3000 cattle and more than as many people could be present. The Fair was held on a hill about a mile and half to the north of the village (at approx. 56°55′11.4″N 2°27′01.7″W). Rows of tents were erected to accommodate the visitors with food and drinks sold by innkeepers from the neighbouring villages. The Fair dates from 1554 when Fordoun was granted the status of a Burgh and was still thriving by the early 19th century. The arrival of the railway to Fordoun in 1849 led to a decline in the importance of the Fair and by 1893 it had ceased.

In addition to the Paldy Fair, Auchenblae hosted a weekly cattle market during the winter season.

19th century developments

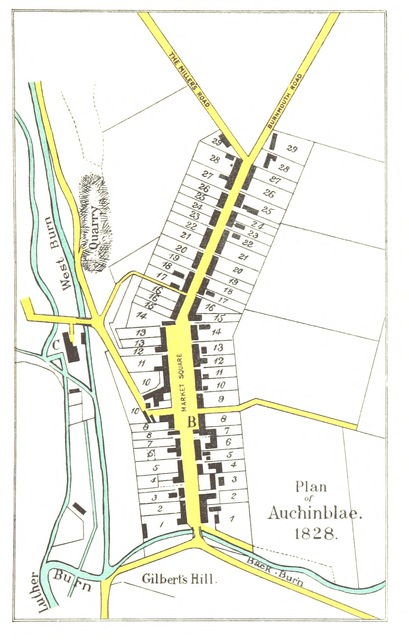
Auchenblae planned layout in 1828. Flax spinning mill built in 1796 shown with a 'C'.

After the Disruption of 1843, a Free Church of Scotland congregation was formed in the village. A church was built in 1843 and a manse in 1847. The church was built at the north of Burnett Street beside the Luther Water. In 1848, the Free Church congregation had a membership of 333 but by 1900 this had declined to 137. The parish joined the United Free Church of Scotland in 1900 when the majority of the Free Church combined with the United Presbyterian Church of Scotland.

=== 20th century to present ===
Auchinblae distillery was a scotch whisky distillery in the village that was in operation between 1895 and 1916. Prior the distillery, the site was occupied by spinning mill, the Den Mill, that was built in 1795 beside Luther Water.

During the 1908 Kincardineshire by-election campaign, the Women’s Freedom League held a meeting in Auchenblae as part of a wider campaign by the group to protest the Liberal government's unwillingness to bring in votes for women.

As part of the national war effort, a number of men from the Parish of Fordoun (consisting of both Auchenblae and Fordoun) volunteered or were conscripted to fight in World War I and II. A war memorial was erected on Gilbert's Hill overlooking the village in 1920 which records the names of the 29 servicemen from the parish who were killed in World War I and 13 servicemen and one civilian who were killed in World War II. The memorial in Fordoun Memorial Hall lists the names of an additional 14 men from the parish who were killed in World War I. Many of the killed had joined the county regiment, the Gordon Highlanders. The death toll from the village would likely have been higher if the parish's principal source of employment was not farming which was protected as a reserved occupation.

The United Free Church congregation united with the main parish in 1929, and the church on Burnett Street fell into disuse. The church building was subsequently converted into a cinema and then a garage but was demolished in the early 21st century to make way for new housing.

In 1968, Scottish farmer and businessman Maxwell Garvie was murdered at West Cairnbeg, approximately 3 miles from Auchenblae, by his wife and her lover, in "one of the most infamous murders in Scottish criminal history".

In 2009, there was a gas explosion at the Drumtochty Arms hotel in the village. The explosion left three people injured and resulted in a fine for the company, as well as demolition of the hotel.

Auchenblae was designated as a Conservation Area by Aberdeenshire Council on 28 October 2014. The stated purpose of conferring a village with conservation area status is to "ensure their character or appearance is preserved and enhanced for current and future generations".

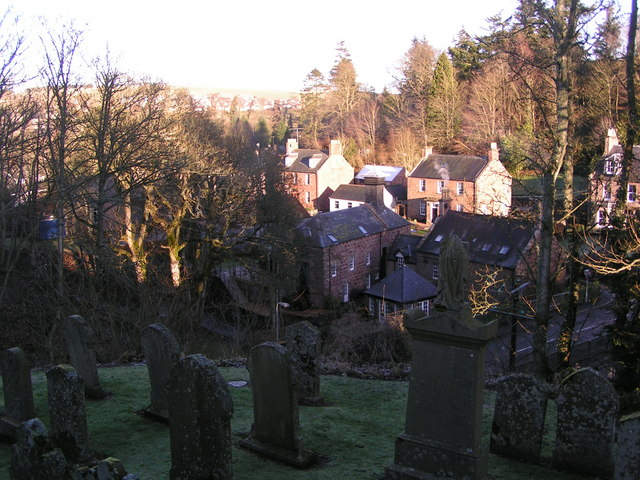
Looking down into Auchenblae from the kirkyard

== Amenities ==
Auchenblae Golf Course, a 3,640 yard, 9 hole golf course is located to the northeast of the village.

Auchenblae has a community owned park called The Den that includes a mixture of woodland, two play parks, picnic areas, tennis courts, a bowling green and a small pavilion with public toilets. The Den is located directly to the west of the high street, running beside the Luther Water burn.

Auchenblae has a second park, located about half a mile to the west of the village with an 11-a-side football pitch. The football pitch was officially renamed Morgan Park on 22 July 2022 in honour of Kenny Morgan who had managed Auchenblae Football Club for over 20 years as well as working as a greenkeeper at Auchenblae golf course.

The majority of the recreational facilities in Auchenblae, including the golf course and the Den, are managed by Auchenblae Parks Committee, a volunteer run village group.

== Public transport ==
Auchenblae is a stop on the Number 26 bus route, operated by Smith & Sons. This route connects Stonehaven to Laurencekirk, servicing the villages in between. On weekdays, there are approximately 6 buses per day, while no services are available on weekends.

The nearest train station is 5 miles away in Laurencekirk with regular trains running to Stonehaven and Aberdeen.

== Education ==
Auchenblae Primary School, formerly Fordoun Parish School, is located next to the church on a hill overlooking the village. The school has capacity for approximately one hundred students with a nursery on the same site providing a further 24 preschool places. Students are split between five composite classes. Students have been taught at the site for over 130 years with the main building built in 1889. The grounds of the school include a variety of facilities including a playground, sports field, wildlife area, and outdoor classroom.

The majority of secondary school pupils from Auchenblae attend Mearns Academy in Laurencekirk.

== Culture ==
Each June, the village hosts the Drumtochy Highland Games on the grounds of Drumtochty Castle. The Games were first held in 1977 as part of the Silver Jubilee celebrations of Elizabeth II. The Games includes a variety of traditional contests including highland dancing, bagpiping, a hill race, tug-of-war and heavy events.

== Landmarks ==
As of 2014, Auchenblae had 75 listed buildings including the village hall, church and school.

Auchenblae school house was built in 1850 and the current school building circa 1889 (they are Category C listed).

Auchenblae village hall on Monboddo Street was built to a gable roof design in 1870 to a design by the Architect Johnstone and is Category B listed. The cost of construction was £500, most of which was raised by a charity bazaar with stalls run by women from Auchenblae and the surrounding parishes.

Drumtochty Castle, a neo-gothic style castellated mansion erected in 1812 is located approximately three kilometres northwest of the village and is a category A listed building. Drumtochty Castle is a popular venue for weddings but is not otherwise open to the public. The St Palladius Episcopal Church is located on the castle grounds and was built by Arthur Clyne for Rev. J S Gammell, the then owner of the castle, in 1885 and consecrated by the Bishop of Brechin in 1886.

Monboddo House, located within a wooded estate near Auchenblae, is a historic 17th-century manor house best known as the birthplace of James Burnett, Lord Monboddo, an influential Enlightenment thinker and early evolutionary theorist. It is a category B listed building.

== Notable people and residents ==
- John of Fordun (before 1360–c.1384), Scottish chronicler who authored one of the earliest attempts to write a continuous history of Scotland, is commonly agreed to have been born in the old parish of Fordoun.
- George Wishart (c.1513-1546), a Scottish Protestant Reformer and one of the early Protestant martyrs burned at the stake as a heretic, was born at Mains of Pittarrow in the old parish of Fordoun.
- James Taylor (1835-1892), developer of the tea industry in British Ceylon, was born in the village.
- James Burnett, Lord Monboddo (1714–99), judge on the Court of Session born and lived at Monboddo House. He was author of The Origin and Progress of Man and Language, a study of evolution that predated the work of Charles Darwin.
- James Beattie (1735–1803), Scottish scholar and writer was born in Laurencekirk and first worked as schoolmaster in Fordoun. He became Professor of Moral Philosophy and Logic at Marischal College and is noted for his Essay on the Nature and Immutability of Truth (1770) and poem The Minstrel.
- Alexander Hamilton (1739-1802), co-founder of the Royal Society of Edinburgh, one of the first doctors to recognise the infectious nature of puerperal fever was born in the old parish of Fordoun.

== In popular culture ==
It is featured in Lewis Grassic Gibbon's novel, Sunset Song, as well as being mentioned in the thrash metal song "Hotel Blast Terror" by Thrashist Regime, based on the tragic 2009 Gas explosion.

== Gallery ==
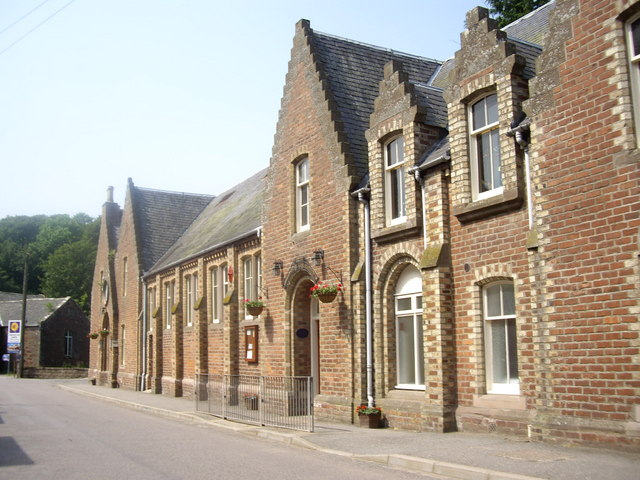
Auchenblae Village Hall in 2009.

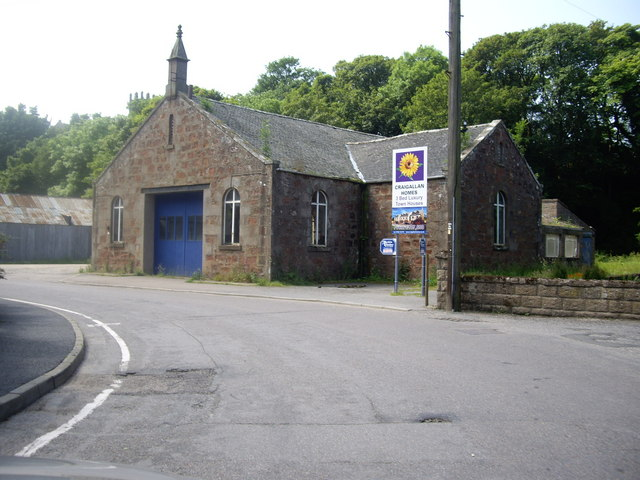
Former Auchenblae Free Church of Scotland building in use as garage (now demolished).

== See also ==
- Drumtochty Castle
- Monboddo House

== Bibliography ==
- Grove, A (1967), The History of Auchenblae, Angus, Scotland: Scottish Women's Rural Institutes, Auchenblae Branch
- Ronald P.A. Smith, Stonehaven/Portlethen Street Plan: Including Auchenblae, Drumlithie, Gourdon (1998) ISBN 1-85812-904-4
