= List of listed buildings in Fordoun =

This is a list of listed buildings in the parish of Fordoun in Aberdeenshire, Scotland.

== List ==
Name	Location	Date Listed	Grid Ref. (Note: Sometimes known as OSGB36, the grid reference (where provided) is based on the British national grid reference system used by the Ordnance Survey. • "Guide to National Grid". Ordnance Survey. • "Get-a-map". Ordnance Survey.)	Geo-coordinates	Notes	LB Number (Note: Historic Environment Scotland assign a unique alphanumeric identifier to each designated site in Scotland, for listed buildings this always begins with "LB", for example "LB12345".)	Image
Store Behind Drumtochty Arms Hotel Off High Street Auchenblae				56°53′59″N 2°26′58″W	Category C(S)	10722	Upload Photo
Brae View Inverurie Street Auchenblae				56°54′02″N 2°27′04″W	Category C(S)	10725	Upload Photo
Denmill Fyfe And Rennies House Burnett Street Auchenblae				56°53′49″N 2°26′59″W	Category C(S)	10735	Upload Photo
Bridge Over Devilly Burn, Clatterin Brig				56°53′38″N 2°33′05″W	Category B	10741	Upload another image See more images
W M Lindsay's Kintore Street Auchenblae				56°53′58″N 2°26′59″W	Category C(S)	10746	Upload Photo
Mr Begg's House Market Square Auchenblae				56°53′58″N 2°27′01″W	Category C(S)	10747	Upload Photo
The Bruce Fountain High Street Auchenblae				56°53′59″N 2°27′01″W	Category C(S)	10751	Upload Photo
The Willows And Scott's Crafts, Kintore Street Auchenblae				56°53′55″N 2°26′57″W	Category B	10699	Upload Photo
Noranside Kintore Street Auchenblae				56°53′57″N 2°26′59″W	Category C(S)	10703	Upload Photo
Argyle House Kintore Street Auchenblae				56°53′57″N 2°27′00″W	Category B	10704	Upload Photo
Kincardine Castle				56°51′58″N 2°32′27″W	Category B	6770	Upload Photo
Monboddo Street, Auchenblae Public Hall				56°53′53″N 2°27′00″W	Category B	49583	Upload Photo
Mossgiel High Street Auchenblae				56°53′59″N 2°27′00″W	Category C(S)	10721	Upload Photo
Former Parish School Auchenblae				56°53′47″N 2°27′06″W	Category C(S)	10728	Upload Photo
Jacks Bank House Off Inverurie Street Auchenblae				56°54′06″N 2°27′01″W	Category C(S)	10737	Upload Photo
Goyle View Inverurie Street Auchenblae				56°54′08″N 2°27′01″W	Category C(S)	10739	Upload Photo
Auchcairnie Farmhouse				56°52′12″N 2°30′39″W	Category B	10740	Upload Photo
Dr D Wiseman's Kintore Street Auchenblae				56°53′57″N 2°26′57″W	Category C(S)	10743	Upload Photo
Cedar House Kintore Street Auchenblae				56°53′58″N 2°26′57″W	Category B	10745	Upload Photo
Strathview Market Square Auchenblae				56°53′58″N 2°27′01″W	Category C(S)	10748	Upload Photo
Marybank High Street Auchenblae				56°54′01″N 2°27′04″W	Category C(S)	10756	Upload Photo
Ryehill Inverurie Street Auchenblae				56°54′03″N 2°27′04″W	Category C(S)	10759	Upload Photo
Norwood Inverurie Street Auchenblae				56°54′06″N 2°27′03″W	Category C(S)	10765	Upload Photo
Ross Cottage Inverurie Street Auchenblae				56°54′06″N 2°27′02″W	Category C(S)	10775	Upload Photo
Phesdo House				56°52′15″N 2°32′00″W	Category A	9646	Upload Photo
Pitremnie Mill				56°53′01″N 2°26′50″W	Category C(S)	9651	Upload Photo
House Of Redhall				56°52′55″N 2°25′23″W	Category B	9652	Upload Photo
Craignoston Bridge Over Burn Of Garrol				56°52′07″N 2°34′09″W	Category C(S)	9663	Upload Photo
Ashley Cottages Inverurie Street Auchenblae				56°54′06″N 2°27′02″W	Category C(S)	49219	Upload Photo
Chestnut House High Street Auchenblae				56°54′00″N 2°27′01″W	Category C(S)	10719	Upload Photo
Fordoun Parish Church Manse Including Steading Auchenblae				56°53′45″N 2°27′04″W	Category B	10727	Upload Photo
Mr Mcgregors' Kintore Street Auchenblae				56°53′57″N 2°26′58″W	Category C(S)	10744	Upload Photo
Mrs Marson's High Street Auchenblae				56°54′00″N 2°27′03″W	Category C(S)	10753	Upload Photo
Glen View Off Inverurie Street Auchenblae				56°54′03″N 2°27′04″W	Category C(S)	10758	Upload Photo
Peaty's House Inverurie Street Auchenblae				56°54′03″N 2°27′03″W	Category C(S)	10760	Upload Photo
Shamrock Cottage Inverurie Street Auchenblae				56°54′06″N 2°27′03″W	Category C(S)	10764	Upload Photo
Kobe House Inverurie Street Auchenblae				56°54′02″N 2°27′02″W	Category C(S)	10770	Upload Photo
Fern Lea Inverurie Street Auchenblae				56°54′04″N 2°27′02″W	Category B	10773	Upload Photo
Adriatic House Monboddo Street Auchenblae				56°53′52″N 2°26′59″W	Category B	10697	Upload Photo
Gowan Lee Kintore Street Auchenblae				56°53′58″N 2°27′01″W	Category C(S)	10706	Upload Photo
Mill Of Kincardine - Bridge Over Devilly Burn				56°52′22″N 2°32′22″W	Category C(S)	9642	Upload Photo
Monboddo House				56°53′41″N 2°25′15″W	Category B	9643	Upload Photo
Auchenblae High Street, K6 Telephone Kiosk				56°53′59″N 2°27′01″W	Category B	13002	Upload Photo
St Palladuis Chapel Within Fordoun Parish Churchyard Auchenblae				56°53′47″N 2°27′04″W	Category B	10726	Upload another image
3. Denmill Cottage Burnett Street Auchenblae				56°53′49″N 2°27′01″W	Category C(S)	10733	Upload Photo
Mrs Ritchie's High Street Auchenblae				56°54′00″N 2°27′02″W	Category C(S)	10754	Upload Photo
Ingleside High Street Auchenblae				56°54′01″N 2°27′03″W	Category C(S)	10755	Upload Photo
Woodstock And J V Nicoll's House Inverurie Street Auchenblae				56°54′05″N 2°27′03″W	Category C(S)	10763	Upload Photo
Rose Cottage & Rosebank Inverurie Street Auchenblae				56°54′07″N 2°27′03″W	Category C(S)	10766	Upload Photo
Rowan Bank Kintore Street Auchenblae				56°53′57″N 2°27′00″W	Category C(S)	10705	Upload Photo
Millarton High Street Auchenblae				56°54′01″N 2°27′04″W	Category C(S)	10717	Upload Photo
Cranwell House High Street Auchenblae				56°54′00″N 2°27′00″W	Category C(S)	10720	Upload Photo
Gean Cottage Inverurie Street Auchenblae				56°54′02″N 2°27′04″W	Category C(S)	10724	Upload Photo
The Hollies High Street Auchenblae				56°53′59″N 2°27′02″W	Category B	10749	Upload Photo
Westfield Inverurie Street Auchenblae				56°54′04″N 2°27′02″W	Category C(S)	10772	Upload Photo
Fordoun House				56°53′01″N 2°26′25″W	Category B	9635	Upload Photo
Phesdo House Stables				56°52′22″N 2°31′59″W	Category B	9647	Upload Photo
Pitarrow Dovecot				56°51′54″N 2°27′01″W	Category B	9650	Upload Photo
Kirkton Farmhouse Auchenblae				56°53′47″N 2°27′08″W	Category B	10729	Upload Photo
Den Mill Burnett Street Auchenblae				56°53′50″N 2°27′01″W	Category B	10734	Upload Photo
5. Beech Villa Burnett Street Auchenblae				56°53′50″N 2°26′59″W	Category C(S)	10736	Upload Photo
Townhead Inverurie Street Auchenblae				56°54′08″N 2°27′02″W	Category C(S)	10738	Upload Photo
Distillery House Auchenblae				56°53′58″N 2°27′08″W	Category C(S)	10750	Upload Photo
Monaltrie Inverurie Street Auchenblae				56°54′03″N 2°27′04″W	Category C(S)	10757	Upload Photo
Cammock House Inverurie Street Auchenblae				56°54′04″N 2°27′03″W	Category C(S)	10761	Upload Photo
Alexander Brown's Inverurie Street Auchenblae				56°54′07″N 2°27′03″W	Category C(S)	10767	Upload Photo
Auchenblae Village Fordoun Parish Church Auchenblae Village				56°53′48″N 2°27′05″W	Category B	10691	Upload another image
6. Douglas, Burnett Street Auchenblae				56°53′51″N 2°27′00″W	Category C(S)	10695	Upload Photo
3. Monboddo Street Auchenblae				56°53′54″N 2°26′55″W	Category B	10698	Upload Photo
Drumtochty Castle - East Lodge				56°54′26″N 2°28′18″W	Category C(S)	9633	Upload Photo
Bridge Of Mondynes Over Bervie Water				56°54′28″N 2°21′34″W	Category B	9645	Upload Photo
Phesdo House Dovecot				56°52′24″N 2°32′09″W	Category B	9648	Upload Photo
Auchenblae, Mid Blairs Farm, Horsemill, Steading And Bothy				56°54′56″N 2°25′14″W	Category C(S)	50009	Upload Photo
Kintore Cottage 1-2 Off High Street Auchenblae				56°54′00″N 2°26′55″W	Category B	10723	Upload Photo
Balmashanner Burnett Street Auchenblae				56°53′47″N 2°26′57″W	Category B	10732	Upload Photo
Holly Cottage High Street Auchenblae				56°53′59″N 2°27′02″W	Category C(S)	10752	Upload Photo
Parkview Inverurie Street Auchenblae				56°54′05″N 2°27′03″W	Category C(S)	10762	Upload Photo
Mr Fraser's Kintore Street Auchenblae				56°53′56″N 2°26′58″W	Category C(S)	10700	Upload Photo
Thistle Inn Kintore Street Auchenblae				56°53′56″N 2°26′59″W	Category B	10702	Upload Photo
C And E Kinty Kintore Street Auchenblae				56°53′56″N 2°26′56″W	Category C(S)	10707	Upload Photo
St Palladius Episcopal Church, Drumtochty				56°54′33″N 2°28′55″W	Category A	9634	Upload Photo
Mill Of Kincardine Farmhouse				56°52′26″N 2°32′18″W	Category B	9637	Upload Photo
House Of Redhall Lodge				56°52′51″N 2°25′27″W	Category C(S)	9653	Upload Photo
Drumtochty Castle				56°54′39″N 2°29′40″W	Category A	9664	Upload Photo
Glencairn High Street Auchenblae				56°54′01″N 2°27′01″W	Category C(S)	10718	Upload Photo
Fordoun School House Auchenblae				56°53′49″N 2°27′10″W	Category C(S)	10730	Upload Photo
Fordoun School Auchenblae				56°53′50″N 2°27′08″W	Category C(S)	10731	Upload Photo
Luther Bank House Kintore Street Auchenblae				56°53′56″N 2°26′56″W	Category C(S)	10742	Upload Photo
Myrtle Cottage Inverurie Street Auchenblae				56°54′07″N 2°27′03″W	Category C(S)	10768	Upload Photo
Lilian House Inverurie Street Auchenblae				56°54′02″N 2°27′02″W	Category C(S)	10769	Upload Photo
Roseleigh Inverurie Street Auchenblae				56°54′03″N 2°27′02″W	Category C(S)	10771	Upload Photo
Auchter House Inverurie Street Auchenblae				56°54′06″N 2°27′02″W	Category C(S)	10774	Upload Photo
Fourdoun Parish Churchyard Auchenblae				56°53′48″N 2°27′03″W	Category C(S)	10692	Upload Photo
Clydesdale Bank Monboddo Street Auchenblae				56°53′55″N 2°26′59″W	Category B	10696	Upload Photo
Thistle Cottage Off Kintore Street Auchenblae				56°53′56″N 2°27′00″W	Category C(S)	10701	Upload Photo
Drumtochty Castle Stables				56°54′35″N 2°29′54″W	Category B	9632	Upload Photo
Bridge Of Keir Over Bervie Water				56°52′18″N 2°23′28″W	Category B	9636	Upload Photo
Mill Of Mondynes				56°54′12″N 2°21′48″W	Category C(S)	9644	Upload Photo
Pitarrow Bridge Over Luther Water				56°51′55″N 2°27′02″W	Category C(S)	9649	Upload Photo
Clatterin Bridge Limekiln				56°53′37″N 2°33′07″W	Category C(S)	9662	Upload Photo

== Key ==
The scheme for classifying buildings in Scotland is:

- Category A: "buildings of national or international importance, either architectural or historic; or fine, little-altered examples of some particular period, style or building type."
- Category B: "buildings of regional or more than local importance; or major examples of some particular period, style or building type, which may have been altered."
- Category C: "buildings of local importance; lesser examples of any period, style, or building type, as originally constructed or moderately altered; and simple traditional buildings which group well with other listed buildings."

In March 2016 there were 47,288 listed buildings in Scotland. Of these, 8% were Category A, and 50% were Category B, with the remaining 42% being Category C.

== See also ==
- List of listed buildings in Aberdeenshire
