= Drumlithie =

Village in Aberdeenshire, Scotland

Coordinates: 56°55′N 2°21′W

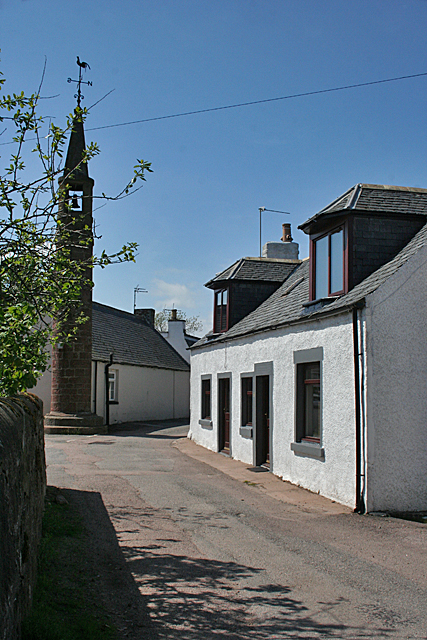
Drumlithie High Street, with the steeple

Drumlithie is a village in the Howe of the Mearns in southern Aberdeenshire, Scotland. Situated seven miles south of Stonehaven in the parish of Glenbervie, it is affectionately known by locals as "Skite", although the origin of this name remains disputed. The name "Drumlithie" incorporates the Gaelic word druim, meaning "ridge".

Previously a weaving village and dating back at least to the beginning of the 17th century, Drumlithie has a small steeple at its heart. This unique structure was built in 1777 and was rung to for the regulation of the meal hours of the weavers. The story goes that when it was first built, the locals were so proud of it that they would take it indoors when it rained.

Drumlithie is noted for its appearance in the classic Lewis Grassic Gibbon novel Sunset Song, while neighbouring Glenbervie is the final resting place of the great-grandparents of famous Scottish poet Robert Burns. Drumlithie is also twinned with Couture-d'Argenson in France.

The village school is called Glenbervie Primary, and is attended by around 70 local children from the village and surrounding area.

== Transportation ==
Drumlithie lies close to the East Coast Main Line and was served by a railway station from 1849 to 1956. The number 26 bus service runs north to Stonehaven and south via Auchenblae to either Laurencekirk or Luthermuir.

== See also ==
- Glenbervie
