= Auchinblae distillery =

Scotch whisky distillery in Aberdeenshire, Scotland

Region: Highland
- Location: Auchenblae, Kincardine, Aberdeenshire, Scotland
- Founded: 1895
- Status: Closed/demolished

Auchenblae distillery was a Highland single malt Scotch whisky distillery in Auchenblae, Kincardine, Aberdeenshire, Scotland.

== History ==
The distillery was created in 1895 in the former buildings of a spinning mill (itself built in 1795) beside Luther Water. The design of the new distillery facilities was carried out by Charles C. Doig. This included the building of a damn across the Luther Water, the fitting of a water-driven turbine generator for electricity and a new iron bridge to enable horse-drawn carts to reach the distillery. The distillery went into liquidation in 1916 and was acquired by Macdonlad Greenlees, Williams Ltd, before finally closing in 1930.

While many of the distillery buildings have been demolished, the hydroelectric turbine remains as does a pagoda roof building in the village centre on Burnett Street.
