= Drumlithie railway station =

Disused railway station in Drumlithie, Aberdeenshire

Drumlithie
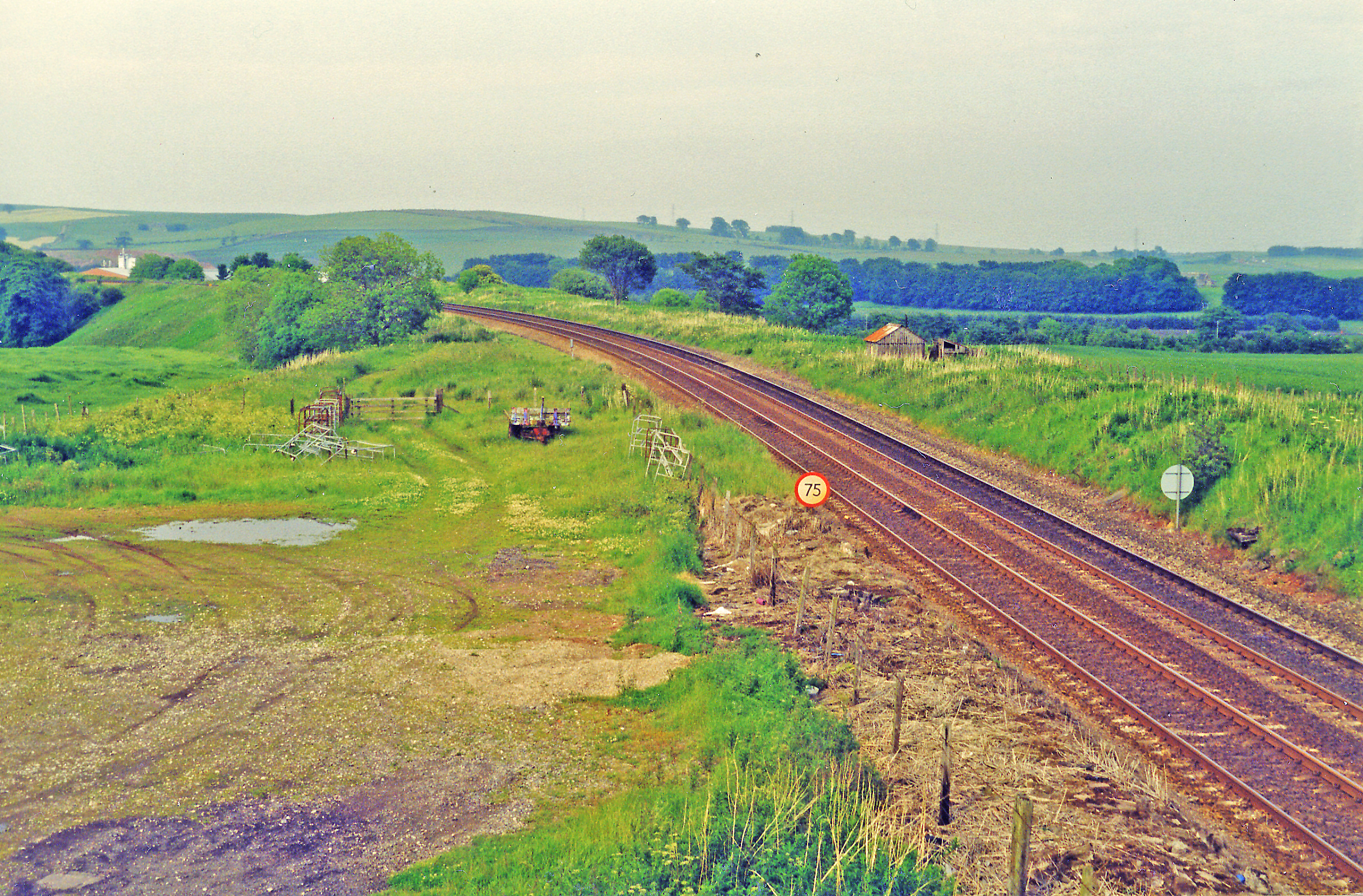
- The site of the station in 1997

General information
- Location: Drumlithie, Aberdeenshire; Scotland
- Coordinates: 56.917°N 2.346°W
- Grid reference: NO790806
- Platforms: 2

Other information
- Status: Disused

History
- Original company: Caledonian Railway
- Pre-grouping: Caledonian Railway
- Post-grouping: London, Midland and Scottish Railway

Key dates
- 1 April 1850: Opened
- 11 June 1956: Closed

Drumlithie railway station served the village of Drumlithie, Aberdeenshire, Scotland from 1849 to 1956 on the Aberdeen Railway.

== History ==
The station was opened on 1 November 1849 by the Caledonian Railway. It closed to both passengers and goods traffic on 11 June 1956.

Preceding station	Historical railways	Following station
Carmont; Line open, station closed	Aberdeen Railway	Fordoun; Line open, station closed
