= Carmont =

Carmont is a surname. Notable people with the surname include:

- John Carmont, Lord Carmont (1880–1965), senior Scottish High Court Judge
- George Carmont (born 1978), retired New Zealand professional rugby league footballer
- Francis Carmont (born 1981), French professional mixed martial artist

== Fictional ==
- Hugo Carmont, a character in the New Zealand soap opera Shortland Street

== See also ==
- Carmont railway station in Scotland
- Carmont derailment in Scotland
