= Oxjam =

UK charity music festival

- Dates: October
- Location: Across the UK
- Years active: 2006 – present
- Website: https://oxfamblogs.org/oxjam/

Oxjam is an annual charity music festival in the United Kingdom that raises money for Oxfam, whose mission is to fight poverty worldwide. Events are held in multiple cities across the United Kingdom every year in October.

Since 2006, more than 50,000 musicians have played to an audience of more than 1.2 million people at over 4,000 Oxjam events since the festival's inception.

== Concept ==
All the events, organisers and volunteers are completely independent of Oxfam and run the festival themselves with all proceeds going to Oxfam.

Oxfam provides the Oxjam branding but no budget to the events. The volunteers fundraise during the summer to collect enough money to put on the events.

The main focus of the festival are takeover events, where gigs occur in several venues (between 3 and 15), in the same location on the same day. Every year between 30–50 takeovers occur, usually in the biggest cities, with London having multiple events due to its size.

Hundreds of smaller events happen in the smaller cities and towns in the UK, taking place in one venue on the same day and range from pubs, community centres, bars and workplaces. Some of these events are held in September and November.

== Oxjam 2019 ==
There are 23 takeover events across the UK happening throughout October 2019.

London – Brixton, Clapham, Hackney, Stratford, Tottenham
South East – Cambridge, Norwich, Windsor
South West – Exeter, Salisbury, Southampton
Midlands – Beeston, Leicester, Lichfield, Mansfield, Northampton
Wales – Cardiff
North – Leeds, Newcastle, Preston, Sheffield, Sowerby Bridge
Scotland – St Andrews

There are also many one-off gig fundraisers being held across the UK.

== Previous Events ==
Locations for takeover events in previous years have included:

2018 – Beeston, Birmingham, Bournemouth, Bristol, Cambridge, Camden, Cardiff, Clapham, Darlington, Exeter, Glasgow, Hemel Hempstead, High Wycombe, Leeds, Leicester, Manchester, Milton Keynes, Newcastle, Norwich, Oxford, Portsmouth, Reading, Salisbury, Southwark, Sowerby Bridge, Tiverton, Tunbridge Wells, Wakefield
2017 – Aberystwyth, Basildon, Bedford, Beeston, Calderdale, Cambridge, Camden, Cardiff, Clapham, Crystal Palace, Darlington, Edinburgh, Exeter, Glasgow, Hackney, Huddersfield, Islington, Leeds, Leicester, Manchester, Newcastle, Newquay, Northampton, Norwich, Peckham, Peterborough, Reading, Sheffield, Shepherds Bush, Southend, Southwark, St.Albans
2016 – Bath, Birmingham, Bournemouth, Bradford, Brighton, Bristol, Brixton, Cambridge, Cardiff, Chiswick, Clapham, Crouch End, Croydon, Dalston, Darlington, Edinburgh, Exeter, Falmouth, Glasgow, Gloucester, Halifax, Herne Bay, Huddersfield, Islington, Leeds, Leicester, Manchester, Newcastle, Northampton, Oxford, Portobello Road, Reading, Shoreditch, Shrewsbury, Stoke on Trent, Swansea, Totnes

== Artist Support ==
Since 2006, many artists and bands have supported (e.g. social media posts, prizes), collaborated and played at launch or takeover events. DJ Fatboy Slim has performed 4 times (in 2007, 2009, 2011 & 2015) whilst DJ Felix Buxton (Basement Jaxx) performed twice in 2016 at the 24hr marathon and Oxjam Portobello Road. Other supporters include:

2006 – Badly Drawn Boy, Franz Ferdinand, Goldfrapp, Hot Chip, Kaiser Chiefs, Kasabian, The Magic Numbers, The Automatic, Embrace, Get Cape Wear Cape Fly, De La Soul, Scissor Sisters, The Futureheads, Teenage Fan Club
2007 – DJ Shadow, Jamelia, Jarvis Cocker, Klaxons, The Kooks, Fatboy Slim
2008 – Editors, Jarvis Cocker, Kaiser Chiefs, The Chemical Brothers, Hard Fi, The Pigeon Detectives
2009 – Basement Jaxx, Editors, Just Jack, Nitin Sawhney, Roots Manuva, Stereo MCs, VV Brown, Frank Turner, Fatboy Slim, Mr Scruff, Dan Le Sac, Mylo, Everything Everything
2010 – Diana Vickers, Four Tet, Johnny Borrell, The Charlatans, Little Comets, The Horrors, Dan Le Sac, Gabriella Cilmi, Faithless, Sampha
2011 – Benjamin Francis Leftwich, Brett Anderson, Charlie Simpson, Damon Albarn, Gabrielle Aplin, Ghostpoet, Patrick Wolf, Fatboy Slim
2012 – Bruce Dickinson, Graham Coxon, Hot Chip, Lucy Rose
2013 – 2manydjs, T.E.E.D, Eliza Doolittle, The Magic Numbers, New Young Pony Club, The Invisible, Zero 7, Chloe Howl, Dry The River, Maxi Jazz, La Roux
2014 – Laura Mvula, The Ting Tings, Declan McKenna
2015 – Noel Gallagher, The Vaccines, Wolf Alice, Everything Everything, Ella Eyre
2016 – Fatboy Slim, Mystery Jets, Basement Jaxx, Zero 7, Stealing Sheep, Birdy, B.Traits, Blonde, Crazy P, Django Django, DJ Mag, Fabio & Grooverider, Friendly Fires, Goldierocks, Matt Jam Lamont, Medlar, Morning Gloryville, Rob da Bank, Secondcity, Simian Mobile Disco
2017 – Sam and the Womp, Blonde Electra, Four Tet, Everything Everything, Metronomy, Mr Jukes, Annie Mac
