= Fordoun =

Coordinates: 56.872920°N 2.411751°W

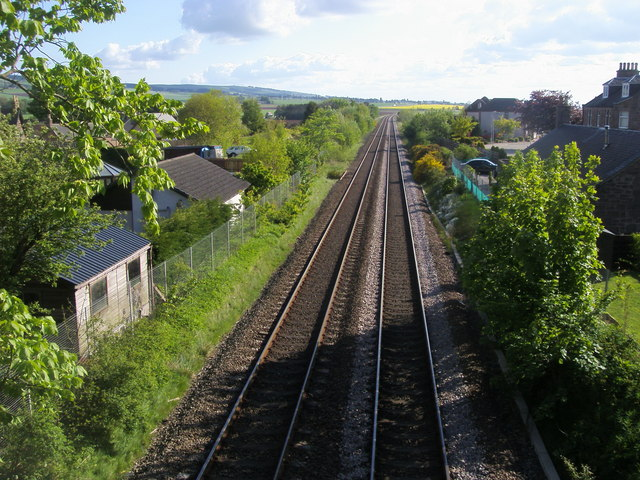
- The Dundee–Aberdeen line passing through Fordoun village

- Location within Aberdeenshire
- OS grid reference: NO750758
- Council area: Aberdeenshire
- Lieutenancy area: Kincardineshire
- Country: Scotland
- Sovereign state: United Kingdom
- Post town: LAURENCEKIRK
- Postcode district: AB30
- Dialling code: 01561
- Police: Scotland
- Fire: Scottish
- Ambulance: Scottish

Fordoun (/fɔːrˈdun/ for-DOON) is a village and parish in the Mearns, in Aberdeenshire, Scotland. The parish also contains the village of Auchenblae.

The village of Fordoun is of 19th-century origin, having grown up around the railway station opened here in 1849. The station closed in 1956. On early maps, the railway village is referred to as "Fordoun Station", while the name "Fordoun" is applied to the settlement surrounding the parish church, at Auchenblae.

== History ==
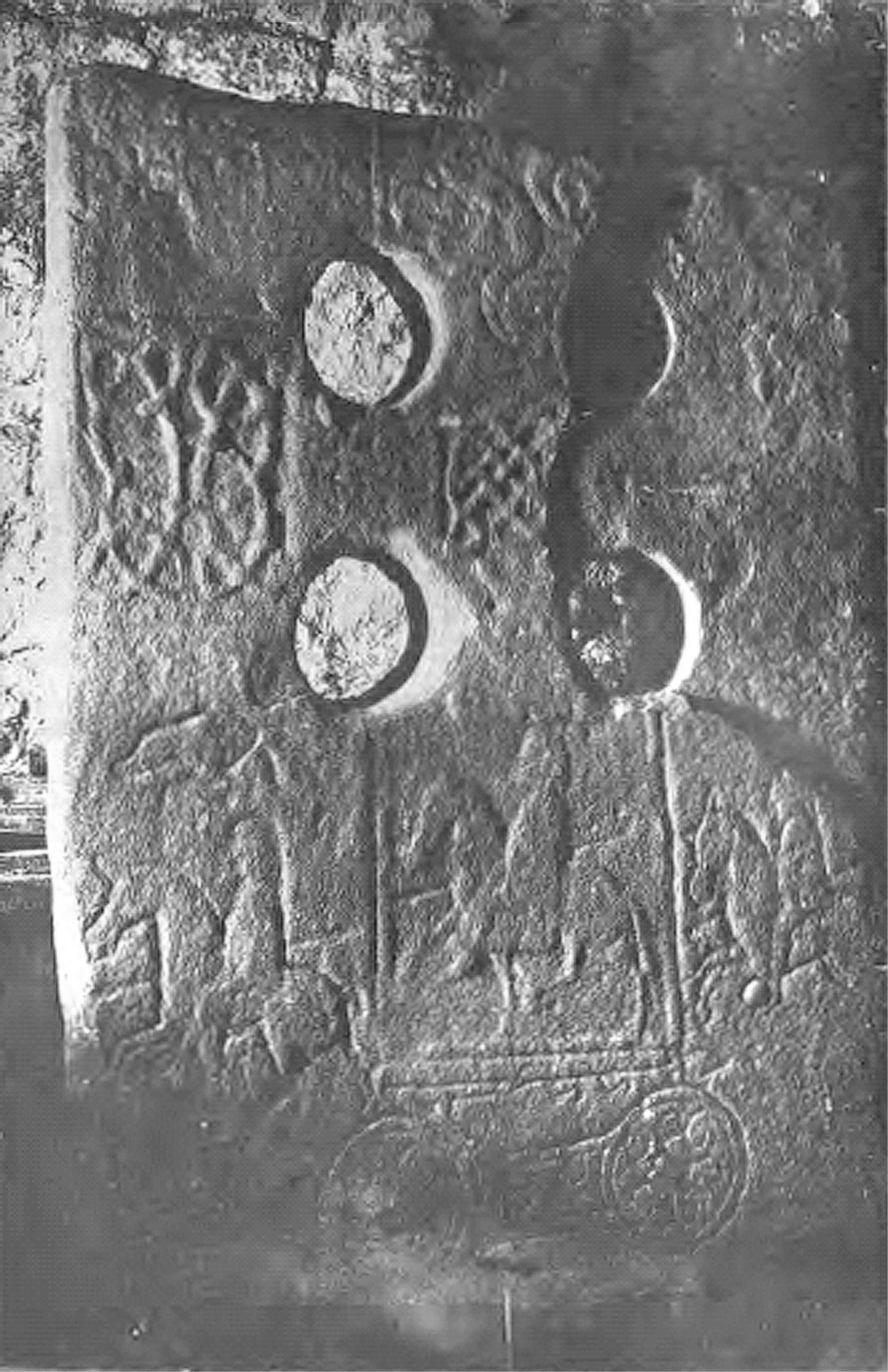
Pictish stone at Fordoun

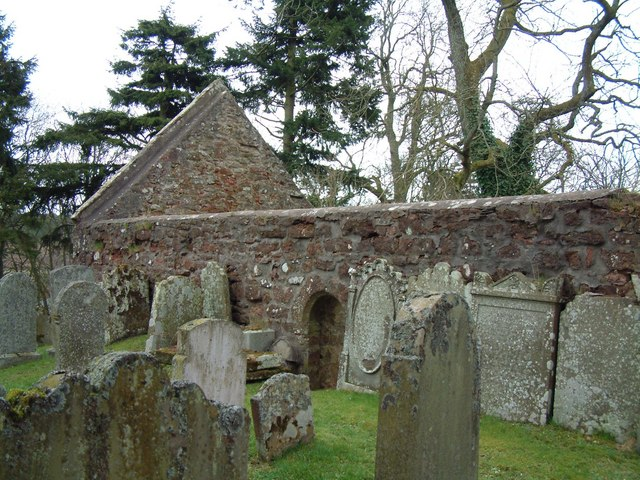
The medieval church of St Palladius in Fordoun kirkyard, Auchenblae

There is a Pictish symbol stone, the Fordoun Stone (also known as St Palladius' Stone), in the kirkyard of Fordoun, situated in Auchenblae.

In his Geographical and Statistical Description of Scotland (1819), James Playfair wrote:

Fordoun is a mean town, and the seat of a presbytery, noted for being the birthplace or temporary residence of John Fordoun, author of the Scotichronicon; and of Palladius, who was sent by Pope Celestine into Scotland, in the 5th century, to oppose the Pelagian heresy. The chapel of Palladius, adjacent to the church, is 40 by 18 feet; at the corner of the minister's garden there is a well still called Pady's well; and an annual fair in the neighbourhood is styled Pady-fair.

=== 20th century to present ===
As part of the national war effort, a number of men from the parish of Fordoun volunteered or were conscripted to fight in World Wars I and II. A war memorial erected on Gilbert's Hill (overlooking Auchenblae) in 1920 records the names of the 29 servicemen from the parish who were killed in World War I and the 13 servicemen and one civilian who were killed in World War II. A memorial in Fordoun Memorial Hall (located in Fordoun village) lists the names of an additional 14 men (43 in total) from the parish who were killed in World War I. Many of the slain had joined the Gordon Highlanders. The death toll would likely have been higher if the parish's principal source of employment had not been farming, which was protected as a reserved occupation.

Also in the parish, on the B966, is a disused airfield that was active during World War II. A two-runway satellite for Peterhead airfield, Fordoun Aerodrome operated from 1942 to 1944.

== People from Fordoun ==
- John of Fordun (d. c. 1384), chronicler
- George Wishart (c. 1513 – 1546), Protestant martyr
- John Wishart of Pitarrow (d. 1576), comptroller of the Scottish exchequer
- James Burnett, Lord Monboddo (1714–1799), judge, laird of Monboddo House, and early proponent of the theory of evolution
- James Beattie (1735–1803), scholar and writer who was born in Laurencekirk and worked as schoolmaster in Fordoun
- Alexander Hamilton (1739–1802), physician and co-founder of the Royal Society of Edinburgh
