= Fordoun Stone =

Coordinates: 56.8962°N 2.4512°W

The Fordoun Stone
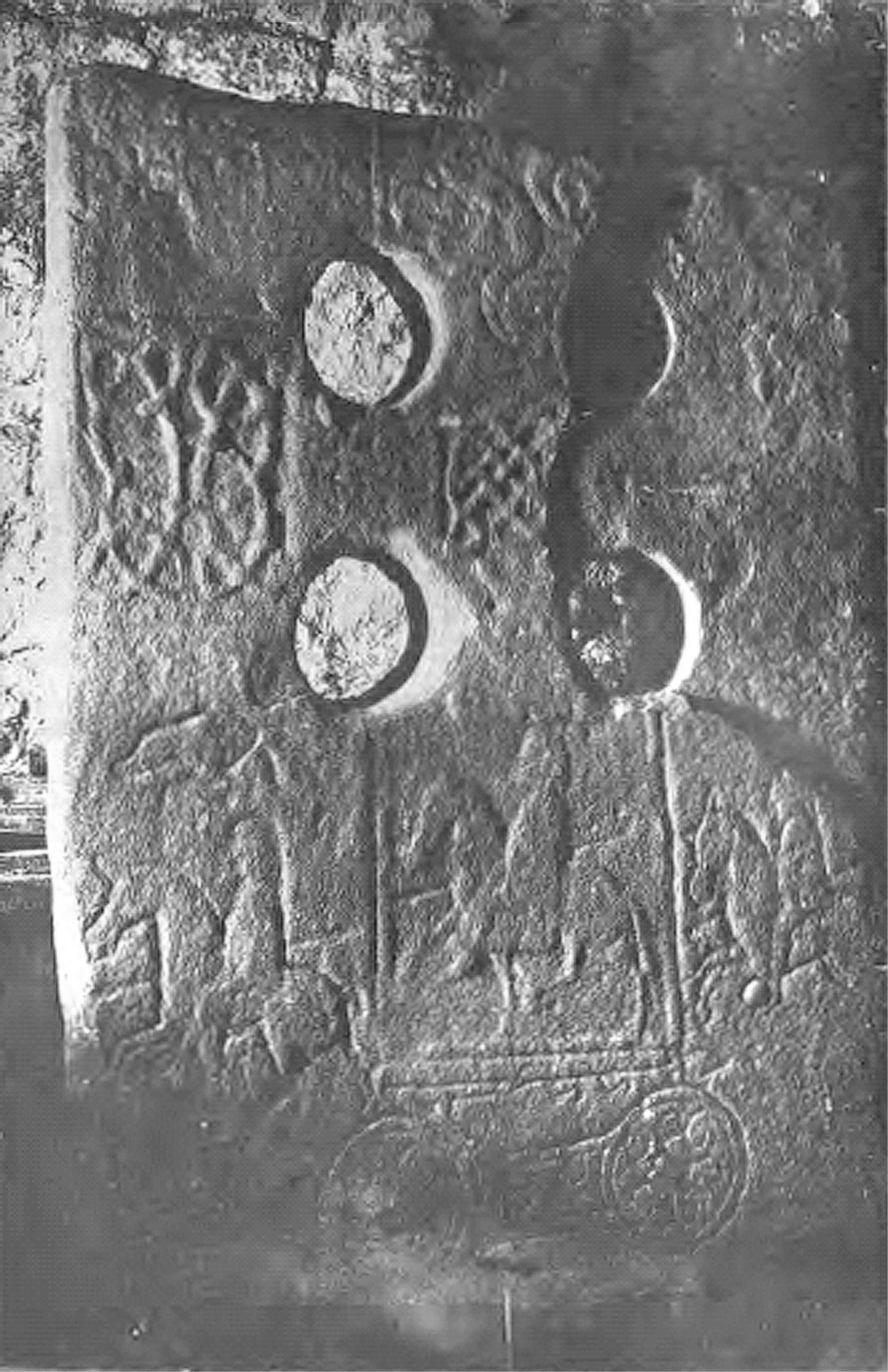
- The Fordoun Stone
- Material: Old Red Sandstone
- Size: 1.07 metres (3.5 ft)
- Writing: Ogham script: VUN-MSETTORBBRE; Roman script: Pidarnoin
- Symbols: Celtic cross; Hunting scene; Double disc and z-rod
- Discovered: 18th Century CE
- Present location: Auchenblae, Aberdeenshire
- Classification: Class II cross slab
- Culture: Picto-Scottish

The Fordoun Stone is a class II Pictish cross slab in Fordoun parish church, Auchenblae, Aberdeenshire, Scotland.

== Description ==
A slab of Old Red Sandstone, the cross slab was discovered in the late 18th century, having been reused as paving in Fordoun Parish Church.

The slab, now standing in the church bears a celtic cross with interlaced knotwork, a hunting scene and a double disc and z-rod design. It also bears inscriptions, Ogham script along the edges of the stone, VUN-MSETTORBBRE as well as an inscription in roman script, Pidarnoin, on the face of the slab.
