= John Kemp (mathematician) =

Scottish mathematician

Prof John Kemp FRSE LLD (1763–1812) was a Scottish mathematician, who settled in the U.S. state of New York for most of his life.

== Life ==
He was born on 10 April 1763 at Achlossan near Aboyne in Aberdeenshire, Scotland, the son of a farmer. He studied Mathematics at Aberdeen University and graduated in 1783. In the same year he emigrated to the United States of America, settling first in Virginia then moving to New York] in 1785.

In 1786 he successfully applied to become Professor of Mathematics at Columbia College (later Columbia University), aged only 23. In 1795 he began teaching Geography in addition to Mathematics and in 1799 he also began teaching Natural Philosophy (Physics).

In 1792 he was elected a Foreign Fellow of the Royal Society of Edinburgh. His proposers were James Gregory, Daniel Rutherford and John Playfair. He was not (as some records claim) one of the founders of the Society in 1783.

In 1810 he visited Lake Erie in relation to an assessment of the then-proposed canal project, and considered it wholly viable.

He died in New York on 15 November 1812 following a long illness. He married twice but both wives died. One daughter (by his first marriage) survived him.
