= Luther Water =

River in Aberdeenshire, Scotland

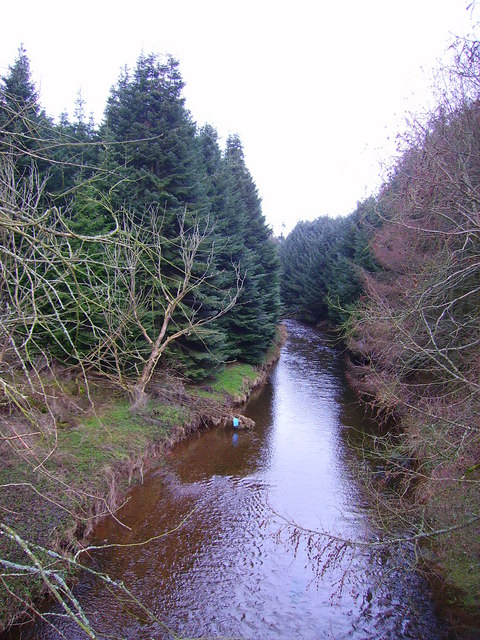
- Luther Water from Old Luther Bridge

Location
- Country: Scotland

Physical characteristics
- Source
  - location: Howe of the Mearns
- Mouth: River North Esk
  - coordinates: 56.78689°N 2.55845°W

Luther Water is a generally southerly flowing river in Aberdeenshire, Scotland that discharges into the River North Esk.

== Course ==
The watercourse rises in the Howe of the Mearns somewhat south of Drumelzie Forest. Draining chiefly agricultural lands, this stream has a notable lack of turbidity and a pH level of approximately 8.26 measured near the Mains of Luther. Turbidity has been measured at 70 centimetres by the Secchi disc protocol. summer temperatures are approximately 16 degrees Celsius and electrical conductivity is 21 micro-siemens per centimetre. Armouring of the stream bottom consists of small rounded stones varying typically from about one centimeter to four centimeters in diameter, some of which are quartzite in composition, leading to a golden-green effect in some locations.

Other nearby watercourses discharging to the North Sea include Cowie Water to the north.

== See also ==
- Monboddo House
