= Thomas Young (obstetrician) =

Scottish Professor of Midwifery (1725–1783)

- Born: 10 March 1725; Edinburgh, Scotland
- Died: 5 February 1783 (aged 57); Edinburgh, Scotland
- Occupation: Professor of Midwifery
- Known for: President Royal College of Surgeons of Edinburgh; Professor of Midwifery, University of Edinburgh

Thomas Young MD, FRCSEd, FRCPE (10 March 1725 - 5 February 1783) was an Edinburgh surgeon and obstetrician who was Professor of Midwifery at the University of Edinburgh. He was the first holder of that post to conduct a course of lectures on midwifery. In 1755 he financed the setting up of a lying-in ward in the Royal Infirmary of Edinburgh, the first of its kind in Scotland and one of the first in Britain. In addition to lectures to medical students he gave lectures to midwives, and provided certification for them. In 1756 he was elected deacon or president of the Incorporation (later Royal College) of Surgeons of Edinburgh.

== Early life and education ==
Thomas Young was born on 10 March 1725. He was the younger son of Janet (née Ross) and her husband George Young (1692–1757), an Edinburgh surgeon who later became a physician and is best known for his empiricism and contributions to philosophy. Thomas Young matriculated in Faculty of Arts of the University of Edinburgh in 1741 and again in 1742.

== Career ==
In May 1745 Young was commissioned regimental surgeon in Lee's (55th) Regiment of Foot. In this capacity he served at the Battle of Prestonpans where he was taken prisoner after the defeat of the Government Army of General Sir John Cope. Many of those wounded at the battle were cared for in the newly built Royal Infirmary of Edinburgh and Young, despite his prisoner status, was among the surgeons who treated them. He left the army in 1750 and set up in surgical practice in Edinburgh.

Young became a Freeman (Fellow) of the Incorporation of Surgeons of Edinburgh in 1751 and in that same year started to give lectures on midwifery at the University of Edinburgh. In 1756 he was appointed Professor of Midwifery at the university. Neither of the first two incumbents of the chair, Joseph Gibson and Robert Smith, had given lectures, making Young the first to deliver obstetrics lectures in Edinburgh. His course consisted of some 50 lectures and copies of notes of these made by students survive. He also gave lectures to midwives and certificates were awarded to those who attended. The certificate awarded to Margaret Reid in 1768 reads:

These are to certify that Margaret Reid attended three courses of my lectures upon the theory and practice of midwifery and also in the Lying-in ward in the Royal Infirmary ... by which means she had the opportunity of operating in all the different sorts of births.

Young had personal wealth as a result of his family's brewing business and in 1755 he paid for 'fitting up and furnishing' a four bedded lying-in ward in the attic of the Royal Infirmary, the first such facility in Scotland. In 1761 he received the degree of MD from the university for a thesis entitled De Lacte, an analysis of the properties of milk and its use in treatment. The following year he became a fellow of The Royal College of Physicians of Edinburgh.

He was deacon or president of the Incorporation of Surgeons in 1756–57. In 1780 he become joint Professor of Midwifery, sharing the chair with Alexander Hamilton (1739–1802). Young invested some of his wealth in property development, building several large houses in what was initially called Young Street, later renamed New Street, where he lived in later life.

== Family and later life ==
His elder brother George Young had intended to pursue a career in medicine, enrolling at the University of Leiden in 1739. He married Margaretha Cassa in 1739 against his parents' wishes and was instructed by his father to return to Edinburgh, which he did, deserting his wife. His father imposed a declaratory of silence or gagging order and George junior went into hiding. He subsequently divorced his wife and does not seem to have continued with his medical career.

On 5 March 1754 Thomas Young married Barbara Gibson. They had no children. Thomas Young died on 5 February 1783 and is buried in Greyfriars Churchyard, Edinburgh.

Academic offices
Preceded by Robert Smith	Professor of Midwifery, Edinburgh; 1756-1783; Served alongside: Alexander Hamilton from 1780	Succeeded by Alexander Hamilton
