= Fordoun railway station =

Disused railway station in Fordoun, Aberdeenshire

Fordoun

General information
- Location: Fordoun, Aberdeenshire; Scotland
- Coordinates: 56.8732°N 2.4114°W
- Grid reference: NO750758
- Platforms: 2

Other information
- Status: Disused

History
- Original company: Aberdeen Railway
- Pre-grouping: Caledonian Railway
- Post-grouping: London, Midland and Scottish Railway

Key dates
- 1 November 1849: Opened
- 11 June 1956: Closed

Fordoun railway station served the village of Fordoun, Aberdeenshire, Scotland from 1849 to 1956 on the Aberdeen Railway.

== History ==
The station opened on 1 November 1849 to the Aberdeen Railway. The station closed to both passengers and goods traffic on 11 June 1956.

Preceding station	Historical railways	Following station
Drumlithie; Line open, station closed	Aberdeen Railway	Laurencekirk; Line and station open
