= Herscha Hill =

Elevated landform in Aberdeenshire, Scotland

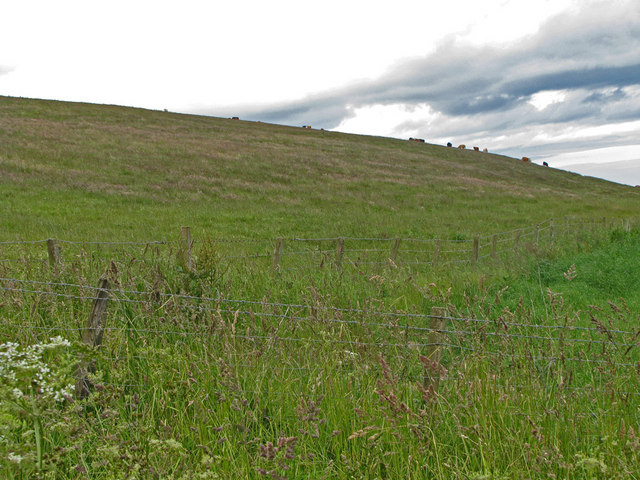
Cows grazing on Hersca Hill.

Herscha Hill is an elevated landform in Aberdeenshire, Scotland. Neolithic archaeological finds have been made at this location.
