= Carmont railway station =

Disused railway station in Stonehaven, Aberdeenshire

Carmont
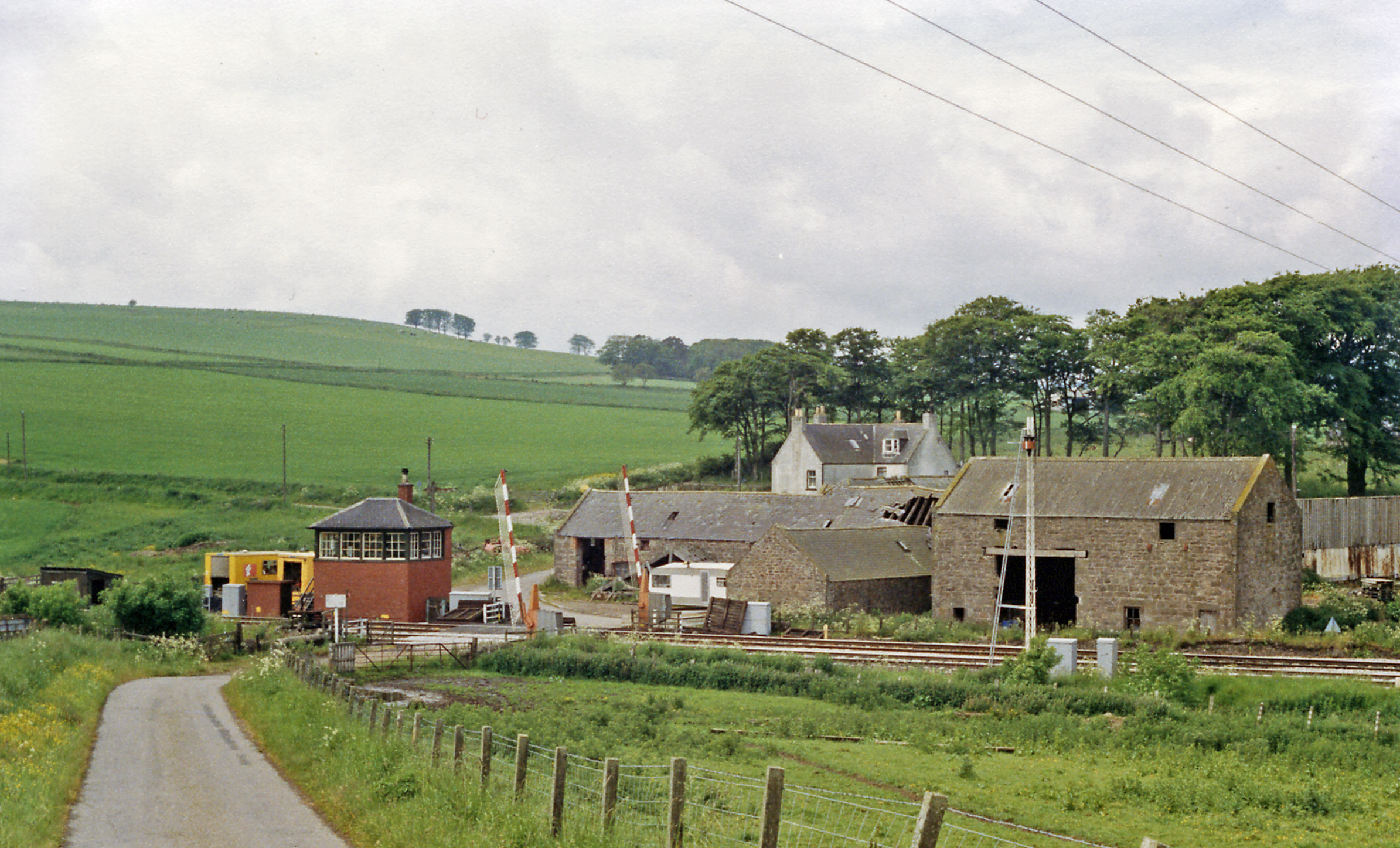
- The site in 1988

General information
- Location: Stonehaven, Aberdeenshire; Scotland
- Coordinates: 56.9387°N 2.35°W
- Grid reference: NO788831
- Platforms: 2

Other information
- Status: Disused

History
- Original company: Caledonian Railway
- Pre-grouping: Caledonian Railway
- Post-grouping: London, Midland and Scottish Railway

Key dates
- September 1855: Station opened as New Mill Offset
- 1866: Station name changed to Newmill Siding
- 1891: Station name changed to Newmill
- 1912: Station name changed to Carmont
- 11 June 1956: Station closed to passengers
- 23 May 1964: Station closed completely

Carmont railway station, on the Aberdeen Railway, served the rural area of Carmont in Aberdeenshire, Scotland from 1855 to 1964.

== History ==
The station opened as New Mill Offset in September 1855 by the Caledonian Railway. The station was renamed to New Mill Siding in 1866, to Newmill in 1891 and finally Carmont in 1912. The station closed to passengers on 11 June 1956 and to goods traffic on 23 May 1964.

As of 2022, the signalbox, and adjacent crossover, remain in use.

The 12 August 2020 derailment, in which three people died, happened nearby, and was reported by a crew member at Carmont Signal Box.

Preceding station	Historical railways	Following station
Stonehaven; Line and station open	Aberdeen Railway	Drumlithie; Line open, station closed
