= Henry Hamilton (priest) =

Scots-born clergyman and mathematician

The Very Reverend Henry Hamilton FRS FRSE

Dean of Salisbury
- In office 1850–1880

Personal details
- Born: Henry Parr Hamilton; 3 April 1794 Blandfield House, Midlothian, Scotland
- Died: 7 February 1880 (aged 85) Salisbury, Wiltshire, England

Henry Parr Hamilton (3 April 1794 – 7 February 1880) was a Scots-born clergyman and mathematician, who was Dean of Salisbury for 30 years.

== Life ==
He was born at Blandfield House, between Edinburgh and Leith, the son of Alexander Hamilton, Professor of Midwifery at Edinburgh University. He was educated at Edinburgh University and Trinity College, Cambridge, graduating BA in 1816 and MA in 1819.

He wrote two textbooks on analytical geometry, The Principles of Analytical Geometry (1826) and An Analytical System of Conic Sections (1828; 5th edn, 1843). He was elected a Fellow of the Royal Society in 1828 as "a gentleman well versed in mathematics", and was also elected FRS (Edinburgh) in 1822, as well as FRAS and FGS.

He became a curate in Cambridgeshire in 1825 and the rector of Wath near Ripon in 1830, becoming a rural dean in 1847. In 1850 he was appointed Dean of Salisbury, a position he filled until his death in 1880.

He took a great interest in children's education, delivering sermons and writing a book on the subject, Practical Remarks on Popular Education (1847).

He died at the Salisbury deanery in 1880.

== Family ==
He had married Ellen Masson, daughter of Thomas Masson of Copt Hewick, Yorkshire, with whom he had one daughter, Katherine Jane (died 1928), who married Sir Edward Hulse, 5th Baronet.

His brother was James Hamilton FRSE (1767-1839).
