= James Hamilton (physician, born 1767) =

Scottish physician

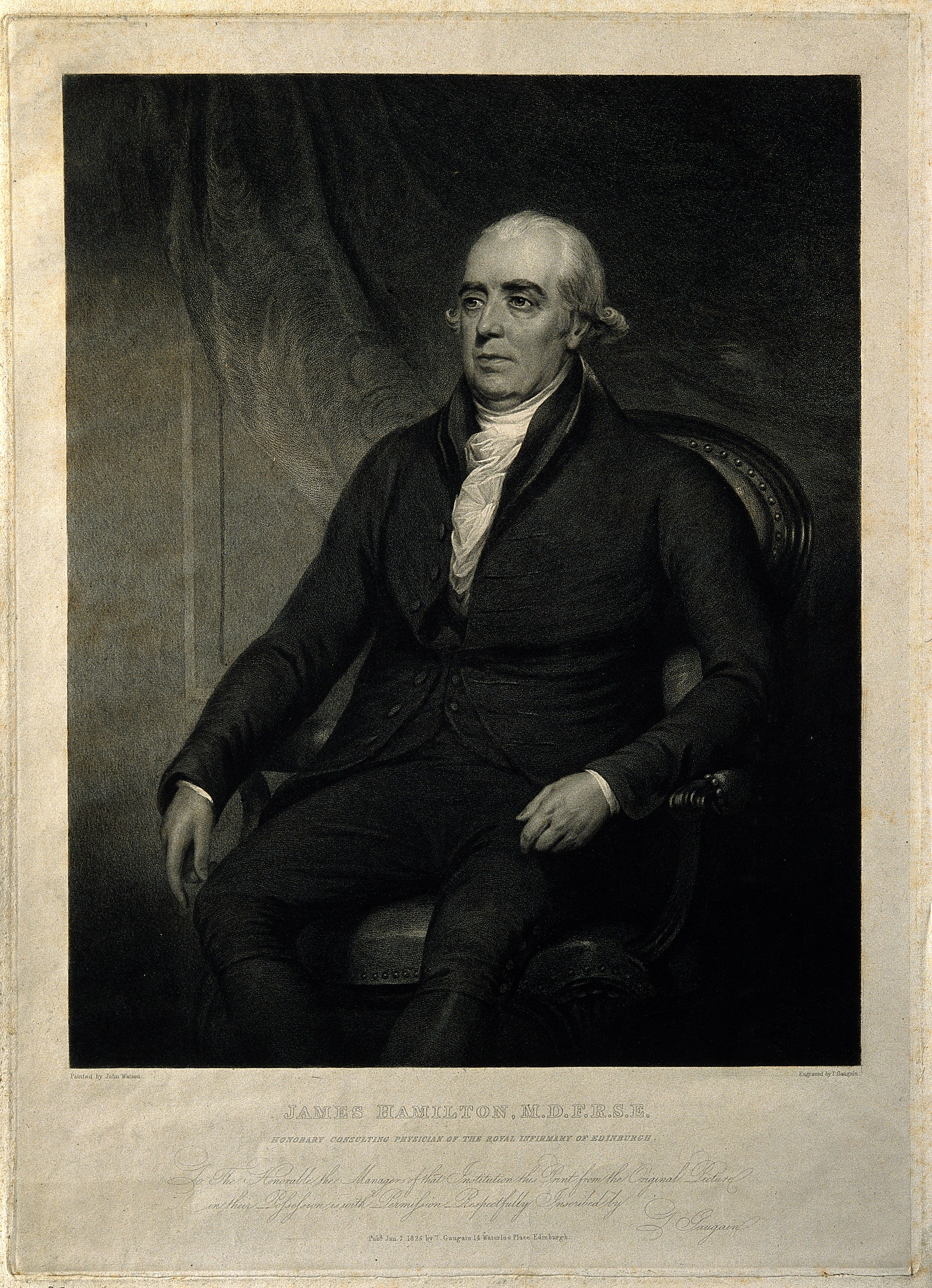
James Hamilton M.D., 1825 engraving

James Hamilton FRSE FRCSE FRCPE (1767–1839) was a Scottish physician. He was a co-founder of the Lying-In Hospital in Edinburgh in 1791. He was president of the Royal College of Physicians of Edinburgh from 1812 to 1815. He was professor of medicine and midwifery at the University of Edinburgh from 1800 to 1839.

== Life ==
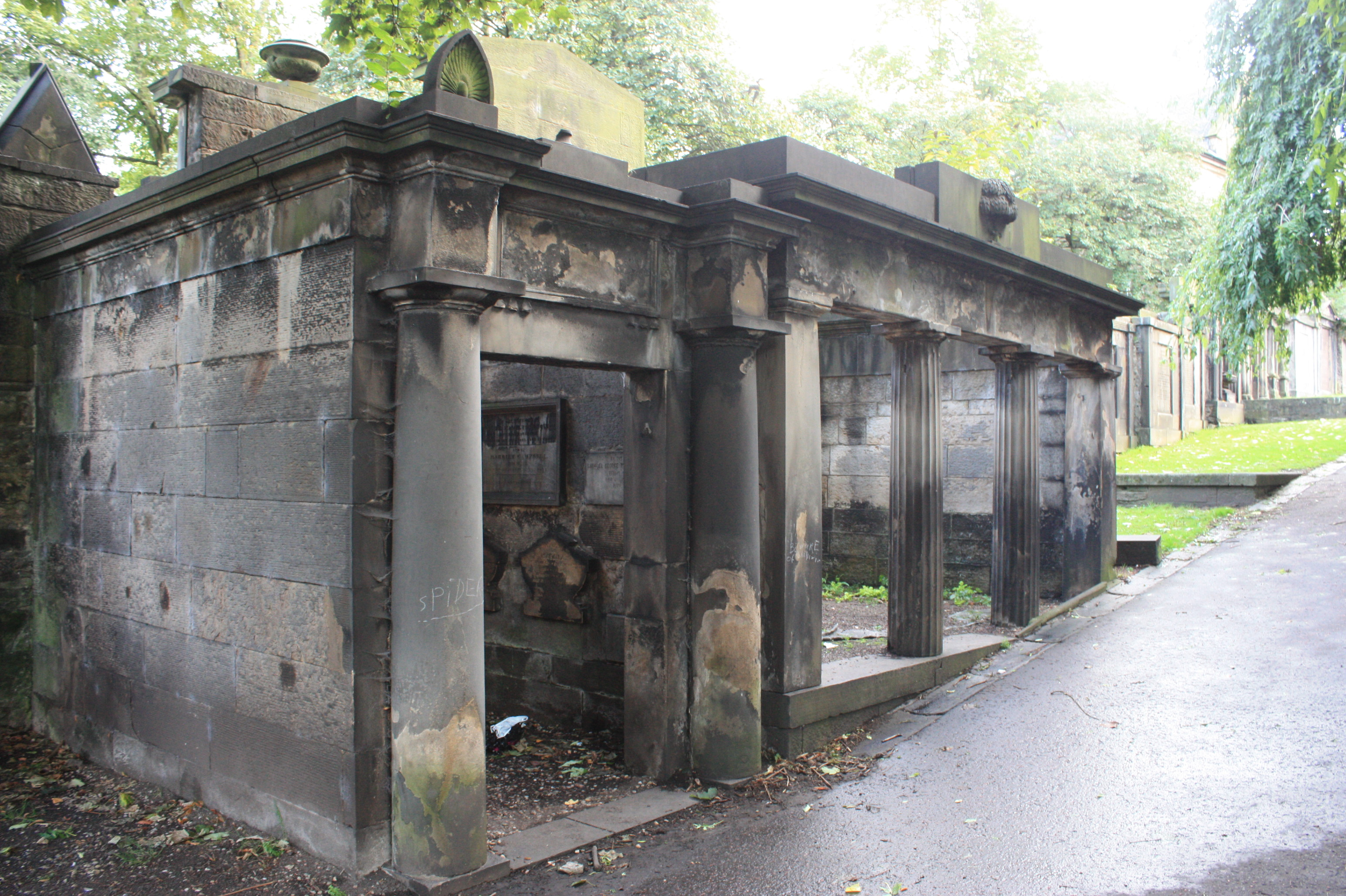
The Hamilton vault, St Cuthbert's Churchyard, Edinburgh

He was born in Edinburgh in 1767, the son of Dr Alexander Hamilton. He attended the High School in Edinburgh, and then studied medicine at the University of Edinburgh (in part under his father). He also studied at Paris, Leiden and the University of St Andrews receiving his MD from the latter in 1792. In 1800, he succeeded his father as professor of midwifery at the University of Edinburgh.

In 1810 he was elected a member of the Aesculapian Club. In 1824, he was elected a fellow of the Royal Society of Edinburgh, his proposer being Andrew Coventry. In 1825, he fell out with fellow Edinburgh doctor James Crawford Gregory as to whether or not midwifery should be a compulsory component of the University course. He bypassed the Senate of the Royal College of Physicians of Edinburgh on this issue and received consent directly from the Lord Provost, William Trotter. When Gregory next met him he beat him ferociously with his cane. He was fined £100 for the assault.

After he died, he was succeeded in his professorship by James Young Simpson.

== Private life and death ==
He was married at least twice: firstly to Isabella (1770-1809) and then to Mary Anne (1775-1837). He lived at 23 St Andrew Square in Edinburgh's New Town. His younger brother was Rev Henry Parr Hamilton.

He died on 21 November 1839 and was buried with his family in St Cuthberts Churchyard in Edinburgh. The family vault lies to the south-east of the church close to the entrance to Princes Street Gardens.

== Publications ==
- Practical Observations on Various Subjects Related to Midwifery (1836)

Academic offices
Preceded by Alexander Hamilton	Professor of Midwifery, Edinburgh; 1798-1839	Succeeded by James Young Simpson
