= Haar (fog) =

Cold sea fog, especially on the east coast of Britain

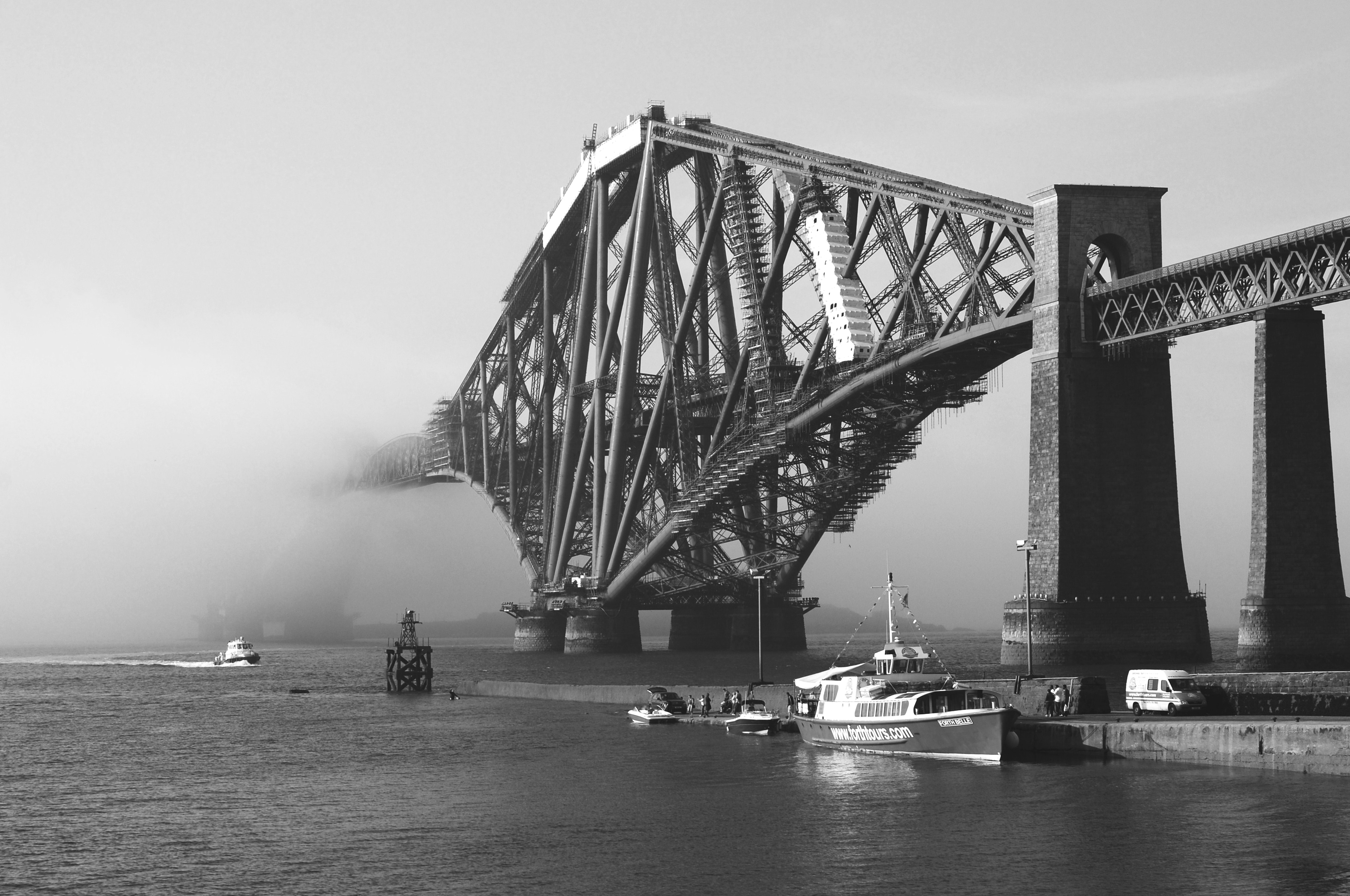
Haar rolls into the Firth of Forth, partially shrouding the Forth Bridge.

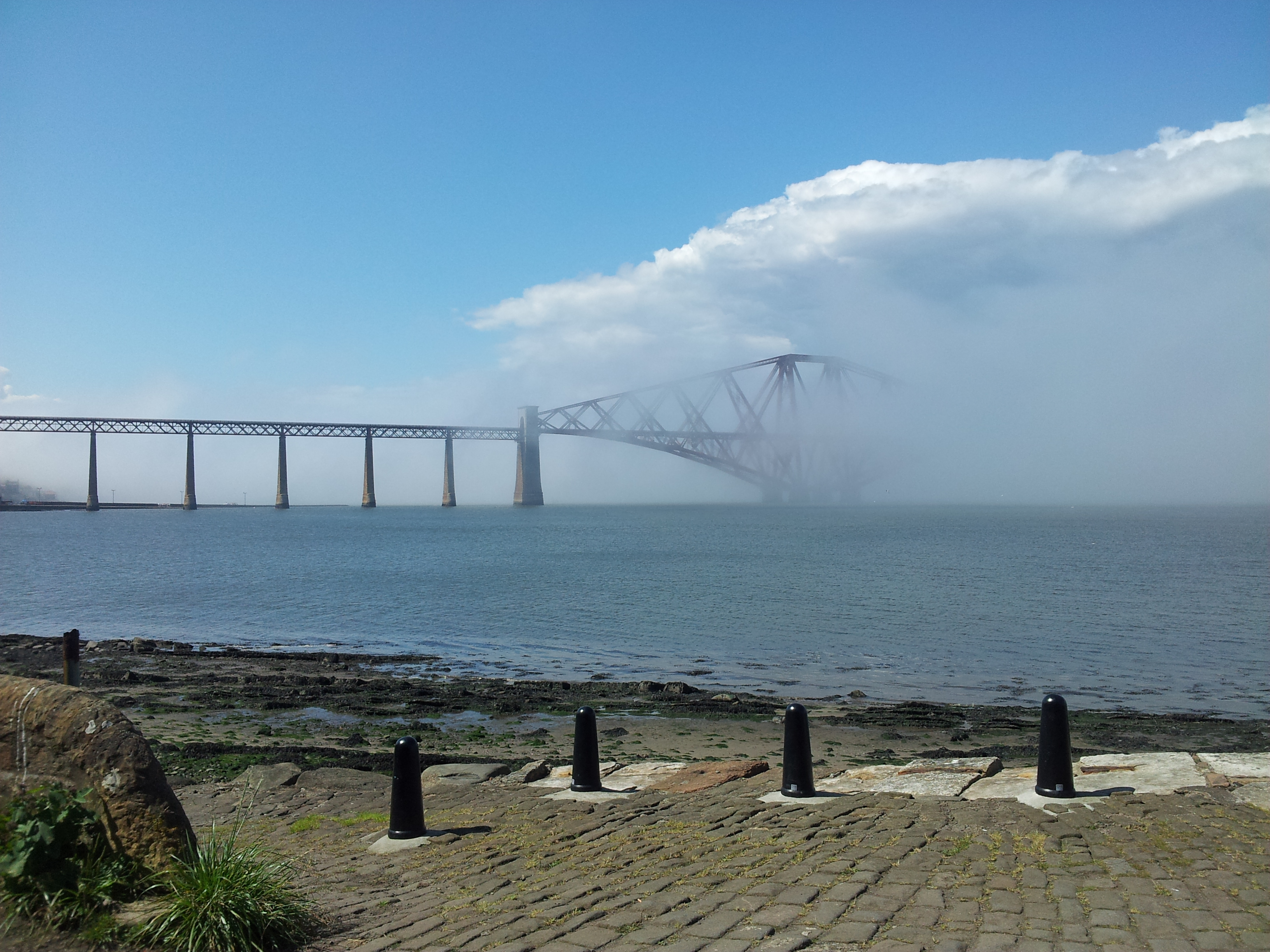
Haar rolling in over the Forth Bridge

In meteorology, haar or sea fret is a cold sea fog. It occurs most often on the east coast of Scotland between April and September, when warm air passes over the cold North Sea. It is also frequently observed rolling under the Golden Gate Bridge towards San Francisco. The term is also known as harr, hare, harl, har and hoar.

== Causes ==
Haar is typically formed over the sea and is blown to the land by the wind. This commonly occurs when warmer moist air moves over the relatively cooler North Sea causing the moisture in the air to condense, forming haar.

Sea breezes and easterly winds then bring the haar into the east coast of Scotland and North-East England where it can continue for several miles inland. This can be common in the UK summer when heating of the land creates a sea breeze, bringing haar in from the sea and as a result can significantly reduce temperatures compared to those just a few miles inland.

== Nomenclature ==
The term haar is used along certain lands bordering the North Sea, primarily eastern Scotland and the north-east of England. Variants of the term in Scots and northern English include har, hare, harl, harr and hoar. In Yorkshire and Northumberland it is commonly referred to as a sea roke.

Its origin is related to Middle Dutch haren, referring to a biting cold wind, or Frisian harig, meaning 'damp'. It has also been suggested to be a borrowing of the Old Norse word hárr, meaning 'hoar, hoary'. It regularly makes landfall in Inverness where the incoming tide brings cold water into the shallow warm Moray Firth and pushes down the Great Glen to Fort William where it shrouds Ben Nevis sometimes for several days.
