= Alexander Hamilton (Scottish physician) =

Scottish physician (1739–1802)

Alexander Hamilton FRSE FRCSE FRCPE (1739–1802) was a Scottish physician. He was a co-founder of the Royal Society of Edinburgh in 1783. He was one of the first persons to recognise that puerperal fever was infectious. He was professor of midwifery at the University of Edinburgh.

== Life ==
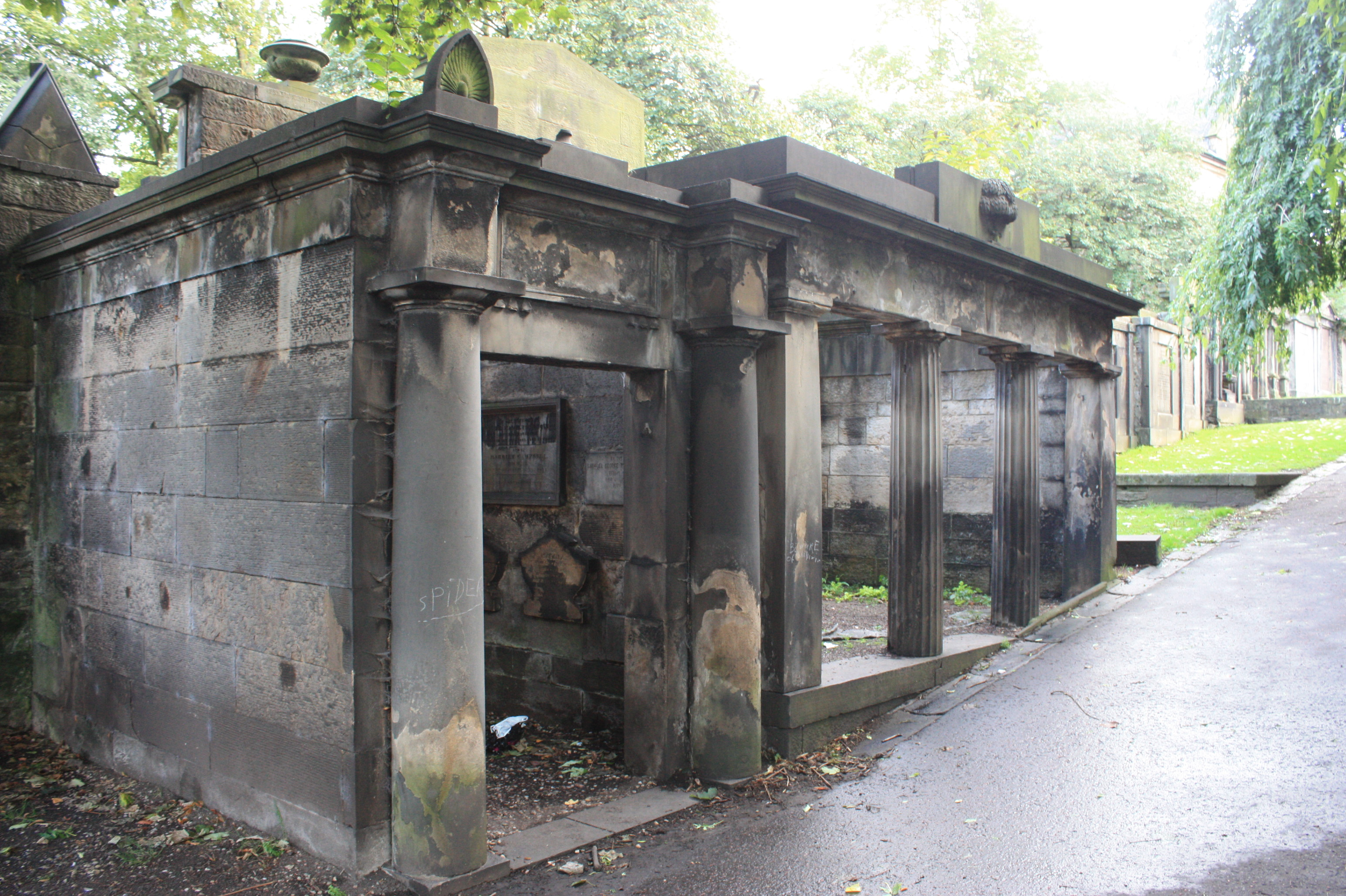
The Hamilton vault, St Cuthbert's Churchyard, Edinburgh

He was born in Fordoun in Kincardineshire in 1739, the son of a retired army surgeon. He studied medicine at the University of St Andrews. He began practising as a surgeon in 1762 at the Edinburgh Royal Infirmary. In 1758 he began as Dr John Straiton's assistant In 1780 he began lecturing in midwifery at the University of Edinburgh alongside Dr Thomas Young becoming a full professor in 1783. He had two houses: Blandfield House (a large mansion between Edinburgh and Leith) and a townhouse at St Andrew Street in the city.

In 1773 he was elected a member of the Aesculapian Club. He was Deacon of the Incorporations of Surgeons in 1776. On 12 April 1782 Hamilton was one of the founding members of the Harveian Society of Edinburgh. In 1791 he founded the Edinburgh Lying-In Hospital.

He resigned his professorship in 1800 and died on 23 May 1802 at his home at 1 St Andrew Street in Edinburgh's New Town. He is buried in St Cuthberts Churchyard at the west end of Princes Street. He lies in a large family vault to the south-east of the church, close to the entrance to Princes Street Gardens.

== Publications ==
see

- Elements and Practice of Midwifery (1775)
- A Treatise of Midwifery (1780)
- Outlines of the Theory and Practice of Midwifery (1784)
- Smellie's Anatomical Tables (1786)
- Treatise on the Management of Female Complaints (1792)

== Family ==
His wife was named Katherine.

His sons included Prof James Hamilton FRSE (1767-1839) and Rev Henry Parr Hamilton FRSE (1794-1880).

Academic offices
Preceded by Thomas Young	Professor of Midwifery, Edinburgh; 1780-1800; Served alongside: James Hamilton from 1798	Succeeded by James Hamilton
