= Evan Duthie =

Scottish DJ, music producer (born 2000)

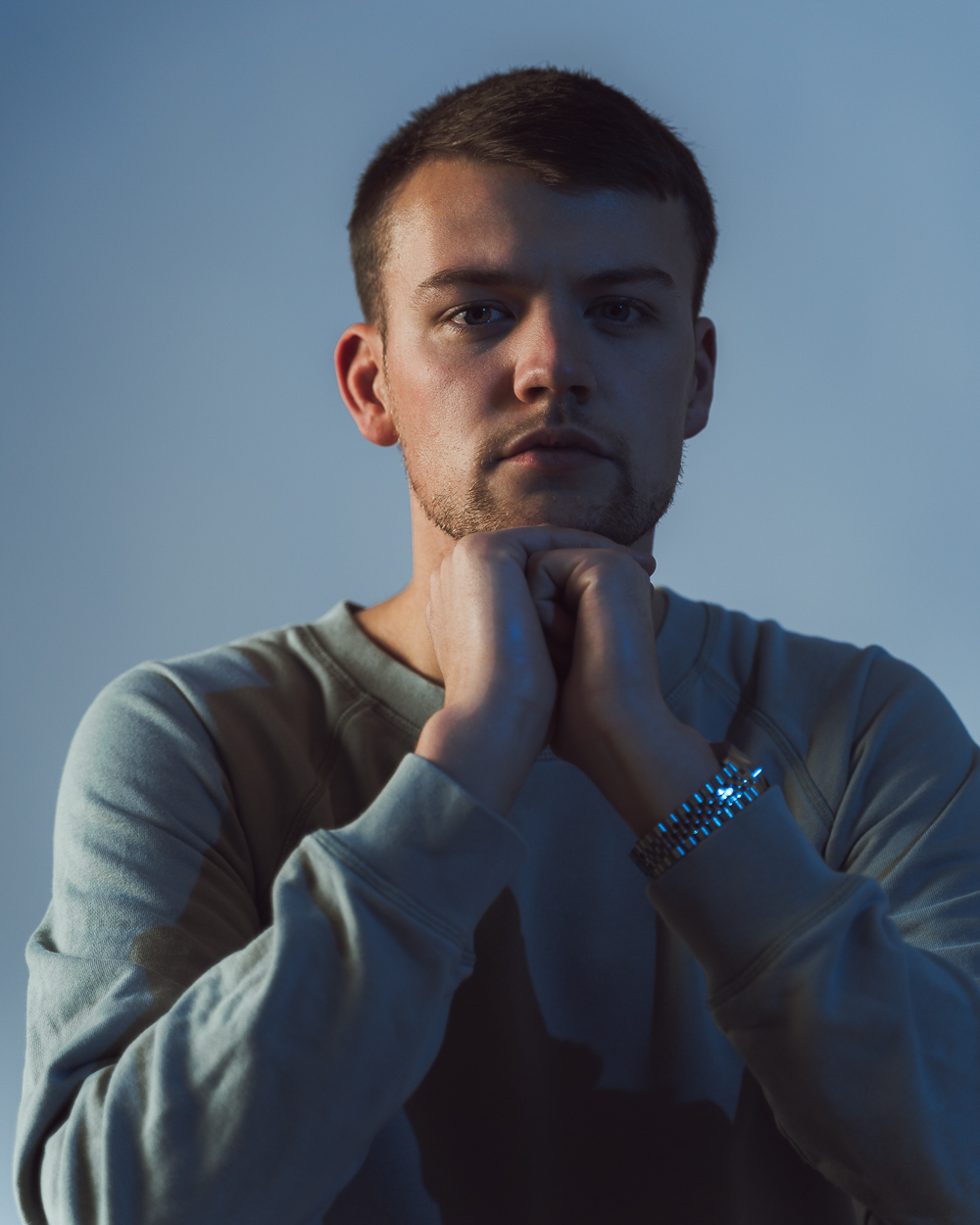

Background information
- Genres: House
- Occupations: DJ; music producer
- Years active: 2015–present
- Website: evanduthie.com

Evan Duthie is a Scottish DJ and music producer. He has played at events including Groove, SWG3, Morning Gloryville, and Enjoy Music festival. Duthie has gained support from the likes of Annie Mac, Pete Tong, Hot Since 82, MK and Hannah Wants. In November 2015, Evan played for Annie Mac's AMP Tour at the 02 Academy, Glasgow.

== Career ==
Evan was born in Aberdeen and has always had a passion and ear for music. He launched his career in summer 2015, aged 14 with his first show at a festival in Norway. Since then he has been booked to play at numerous festivals including Enjoy, Belladrum, Cultivate and Field Trip Festival as well as Ibiza Rocks, SWG3, Oval Space, supported MK at Unit 51 and for Radio 1's Annie Mac's UK tour at the o2 Academy, Glasgow. He has played alongside some of the most influential names in the industry: Annie Mac, Green Velvet, John Digweed, Melé, MK and Mella Dee to name a few. Within a day of being on Ibiza he secured his first set at Hush. He also performed at Ibiza Rocks.

In 2020, Evan spent lockdown in his studio creating music, which lead to his track 'You Got Lucky' sparking support from numerous BBC radio 1 shows including two plays by Pete Tong and as Annie Mac. He released his debut single on Glasgow Underground which reached #22 in the Beatport Top 100 chart. His follow up single 'For You' was made Jaguar's 'Dance Floor Moment' when she covered Danny Howard's Radio 1 show. In 2021, Evan released a 3 track EP on Hannah Want's Etiquette label and a 2 track EP on W&O Street Tracks picking up support from the likes of Danny Howard, ANTS, Gorgon City and MK.

In November 2015, Duthie won the Pride of Aberdeen Award in the 'One to Watch' music category'. In June 2016, he performed at the Enjoy Music Festival where other artists playing included Example and Dusky. In August 2016, Duthie played at Morning Gloryville at the Oval Space in London. In summer 2017, he traveled to Ibiza and played at places including Hush & Ibiza Rocks.

Duthie became an endorsee of ACS Custom, a custom earplug company at the beginning of 2016 and has recently in September became an ambassador for the British Tinnitus Association (BTA).

== Discography ==
Music Releases
Year	Title	Label	Link to release
2020	You Got Lucky	Glasgow Ungderground	https://www.beatport.com/track/you-got-lucky-extended-mix/13621805
2021	Echo EP	Etiquette	https://www.beatport.com/track/echo/15142385
2021	Flutear EP	W&O Street Tracks	https://www.beatport.com/track/flutear/15306614
2023	Waiting EP	Under Pressure	https://www.beatport.com/track/waiting-feat-allknight/17580662
2023	Hyde EP	W&O Street Tracks	https://fanlink.to/hyde__4
2023	Nobody EP	Knee Deep in Sound	https://open.spotify.com/album/62yGuY1DGQSoq7exHWY4Wi?go=1
