= Morning Gloryville =

Daytime rave event

- Genre: Electronic dance music
- Locations: London, international
- Years active: 2013-present
- Founders: Nico Thoemmes and Samantha Moyo
- Website: morninggloryville.com

Morning Gloryville (originally named Morning Glory) is a sober, drug-free morning rave event in the United Kingdom. Morning Gloryville was founded in 2013 by Nico Thoemmes and Samantha Moyo. It was designed to be "fun... without the alcohol", and an alternative to the morning gym. One of the aims is to "reengage people with a form of exercise" without the negative health impacts of drugs and alcohol.

The original event occurs once a month in Shoreditch, East London. Since then Morning Gloryville has expanded to 14 cities around the world. The event is not exclusively raving, but also includes yoga and massage. Because the event is drug and alcohol free it is also popular with families and children.

Notable DJs to have performed at the events include Basement Jaxx. Morning Gloryville was held at Bestival in September 2014. They also support up and coming DJs and in August 2016, they had Evan Duthie perform.

== Conscious Clubbing ==
Morning Gloryville is also cited as creating the concept of “Conscious Clubbing” This term can be used to mean a variety of things, clubs such as Raha use this to distinguish Non-profit-making monthly night clubs from commercial night clubs, as they can have more "ethical foundations" and they aim to "altering the concept of clubbing". Clubs such as Asleep At The Wheel use this term to identify this as an alternative club, which incorporates "live music, visuals, art, talks and poetry readings".

== See also ==
- List of electronic music festivals
- Live electronic music

== Links ==
- morninggloryville.com
