= Monboddo House =

Historic structure in Scotland

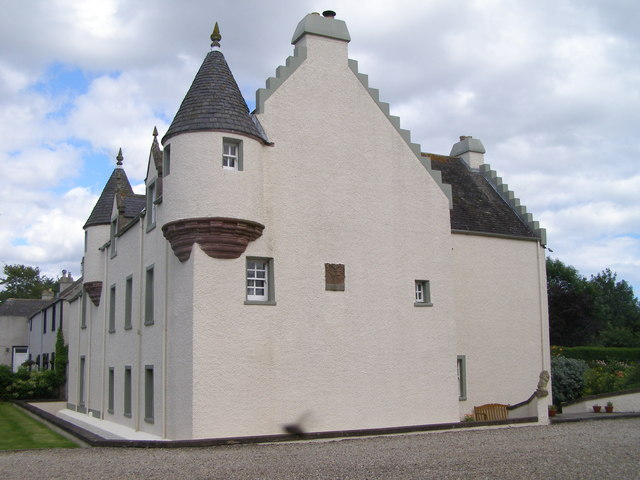
Monboddo House as restored in 2006

Monboddo House (56.89°N 02.42°W) is a historically famous mansion in The Mearns, Scotland. The structure was generally associated with the Burnett of Leys family. The property itself was owned by the Barclay family from the 13th century, at which time a tower house structure was erected. In 1593, the Laird was James Strachan, and thence it passed into the Irvine family and thereafter the Burnetts of Leys. There is a notable datestone adornment on the structure with the arms of Irvine impaling the arms of Douglas with initials R.E. and I.E. and dated 1635, representing the 17th-century couple who reconstructed the house, Robert Ervine (sic) and Ilizabeth Ervine (sic). Monboddo House, with its crow-stepped gable design, is situated in the Howe of Mearns near the village of Auchenblae approximately nine miles (14 km) from the North Sea. The original landholding of the Monboddo Estate was approximately 200 square kilometres (77 sq mi).

In 1714 the well-known judge and philosopher James Burnett, Lord Monboddo was born in Monboddo House. Lord Monboddo is renowned for his service as a member of the Court of Session, an author of several works during the Scottish Enlightenment and a precursive contributor to the theory of evolution. When he was appointed to the Court of Sessions, Burnett took the title of his father's estate, Monboddo House. In 1773 the author Samuel Johnson, accompanied by James Boswell, visited Monboddo House to call upon James Burnett. It is a category B listed building.

== Interior detail ==
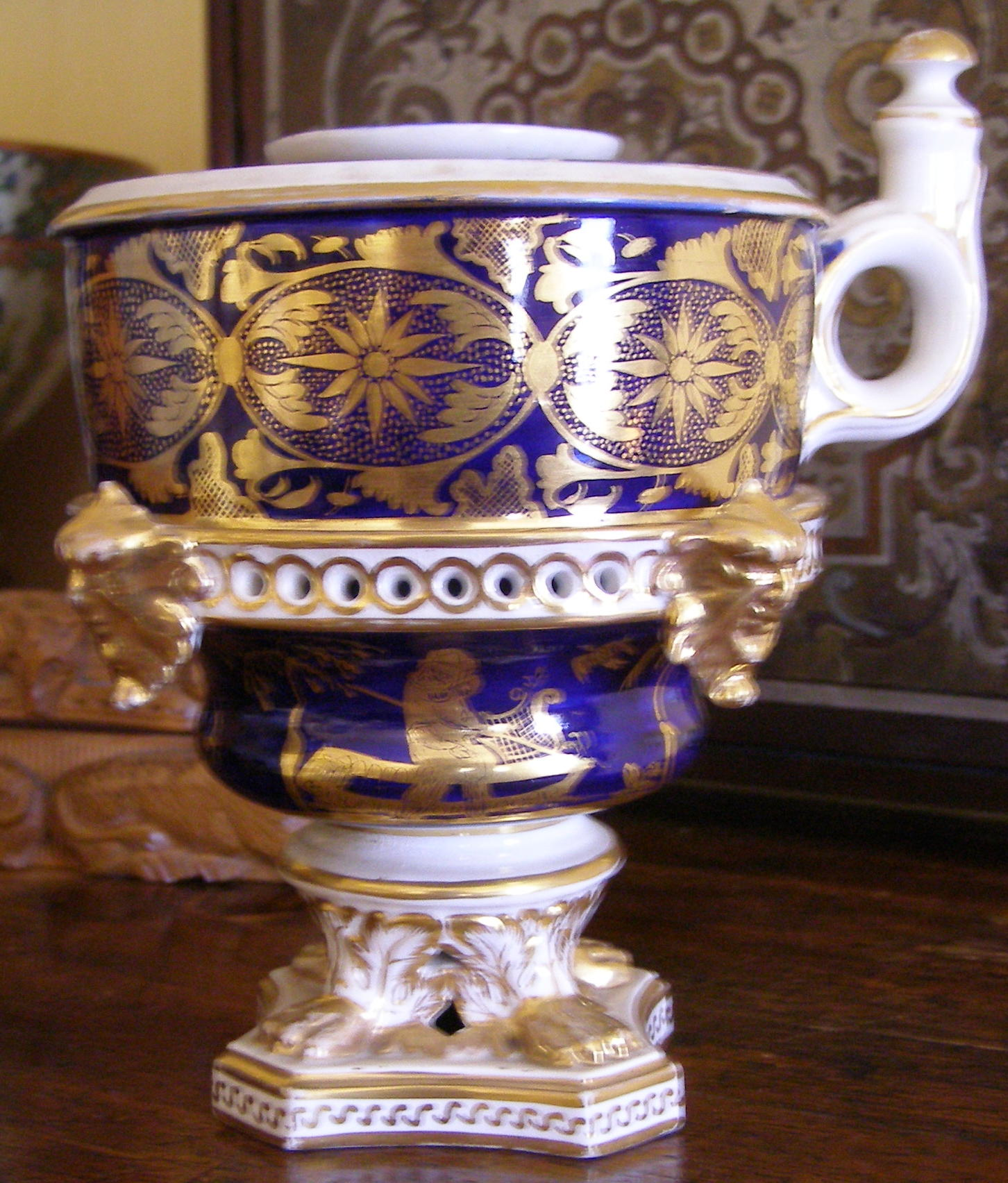
Lord Monboddo's original inkwell circa 1760 preserved intact to the present day

Monboddo House fell into a state of disrepair as of the 1960s; nevertheless, a number of notable features remain. With repairs made during the latter part of the 20th century and the good maintenance of the owner as of 2006, the structure is in excellent condition. A well-proportioned hall is on the first floor (second floor in American English), which has relics of early panelling. The hall is provided with two garderobes. While the basement has no vaulting, the westernmost basement chamber is the old kitchen, containing a very large fireplace arch.

An interior stone spiral staircase is found in an ascending clockwise manner characteristic of defensive designs of towerhouses of the 14th century. Two eight-centimetre diameter gun loops are found within the 80-centimetre thick Old Red Sandstone exterior walls (Hogan, 2006).

The front porch is extant, known for the location where Lord Monboddo would take his early morning cold water bath in the open air in the mid-18th century.

Other nearby famous noble homes in northeast Scotland built by the Burnetts of Leys are Crathes Castle and Muchalls Castle. There is extant considerable genealogical data concerning the Burnett of Leys family (see particularly G. Burnett, 1901, and Bailey et al., 2005).

== Setting details ==
The surrounding countryside is fertile agricultural land producing grains and providing grazing for cattle. Topographically the region is composed of very gently rolling terrain quite suitable for agriculture. In the 18th century, the estate would have amounted to approximately 190 square kilometres. While there were numerous smaller residences on the estate from the 18th century on, in the 19th and 20th centuries more development has taken place closer to Monboddo House in the form of several single-family residences. The estate has a peaceful setting being several kilometres from the nearest dual carriageway, the A90. Sound levels were measured at the estate to be in the range of 48 to 53 dBA.

== Twentieth century ==
In 1930 a postcard of Monboddo House was created by G. Arthur Dixon. After Burnett ownership ceased in the early 1960s the estate fell into disrepair, a situation that has been reversed. As of 2006 the home is in a good state of conservation and repair. The owner reported that there is considerable current interest in the house from people around the world with an interest in Lord Monboddo; particular interest derives not only from researchers in the United Kingdom but also Japan and the United States. Monboddo House is less frequently referred to as Monboddo Castle. James Malcolm Burnett, the last laird of Monboddo, had no children of his own, but had one stepson, who now lives in Canada.
