= Aberdeenshire =

Council area of Scotland

Aberdeenshire: Siorrachd Obar Dheathain (Scottish Gaelic); Aiberdeenshire (Scots)
- Council area
- Aberdeenshire shown within Scotland
- Coordinates: 57°9′3.6″N 2°7′22.8″W
- Sovereign state: United Kingdom
- Country: Scotland
- Lieutenancy area: Aberdeenshire, Banffshire (part), Kincardineshire
- Incorporated: 1 April 1996
- Named for: Aberdeenshire
- Administrative HQ: Aberdeen

Government
  - Type: Council
  - Body: Aberdeenshire Council
  - Control: No overall control
  - MPs: 3 MPs: Andrew Bowie (C); Harriet Cross (C); Seamus Logan (SNP)
  - MSPs: 12 MSPs: Alexander Burnett (C); Dawn Black (SNP); Duncan Massey (REF); Gillian Martin (SNP); James Adams (C); Karen Adam (SNP); Liam Kerr (C); Maggie Chapman (G); Mark Simpson (REF); Michael Marra (LAB); Stephen Flynn (SNP); Yi-pei Chou Turvey (LD)

Area
  - Total: 2,437 sq mi (6,313 km^{2})
  - Rank: 4th

Population (2024)
  - Total: 265,080
  - Rank: 6th
  - Density: 110/sq mi (42/km^{2})
- Time zone: UTC+0 (GMT)
  - Summer (DST): UTC+1 (BST)
- ISO 3166 code: GB-ABD
- GSS code: S12000034
- Website: aberdeenshire.gov.uk

Aberdeenshire (Scots: Aiberdeenshire; Scottish Gaelic: Siorrachd Obar Dheathain) is one of the 32 council areas of Scotland.

It takes its name from the historic county of Aberdeenshire, which had substantially different boundaries. The Aberdeenshire Council area includes all of the areas of the historic counties of Aberdeenshire and Kincardineshire except the area making up Aberdeen City Council area, as well as part of Banffshire. The historic county boundaries are still officially used for a few purposes, namely land registration and lieutenancy.

Aberdeenshire Council is headquartered at Woodhill House in Aberdeen, making it the only Scottish council whose headquarters are located outside its jurisdiction. Aberdeen itself forms a different council area (Aberdeen City). Aberdeenshire borders onto Angus and Perth and Kinross to the south, Highland and Moray to the west and Aberdeen City to the east.

Traditionally, it has depended economically on the primary sector (agriculture, fishing, and forestry) and related processing industries. Over the last 40 years, the development of the oil and gas industry and associated service sector has broadened Aberdeenshire's economic base, and contributed to a rapid population growth of some 50% since 1975. Its land represents 8% of Scotland's overall territory. It covers an area of 6,313 square kilometres (2,437 sq mi).

== History ==
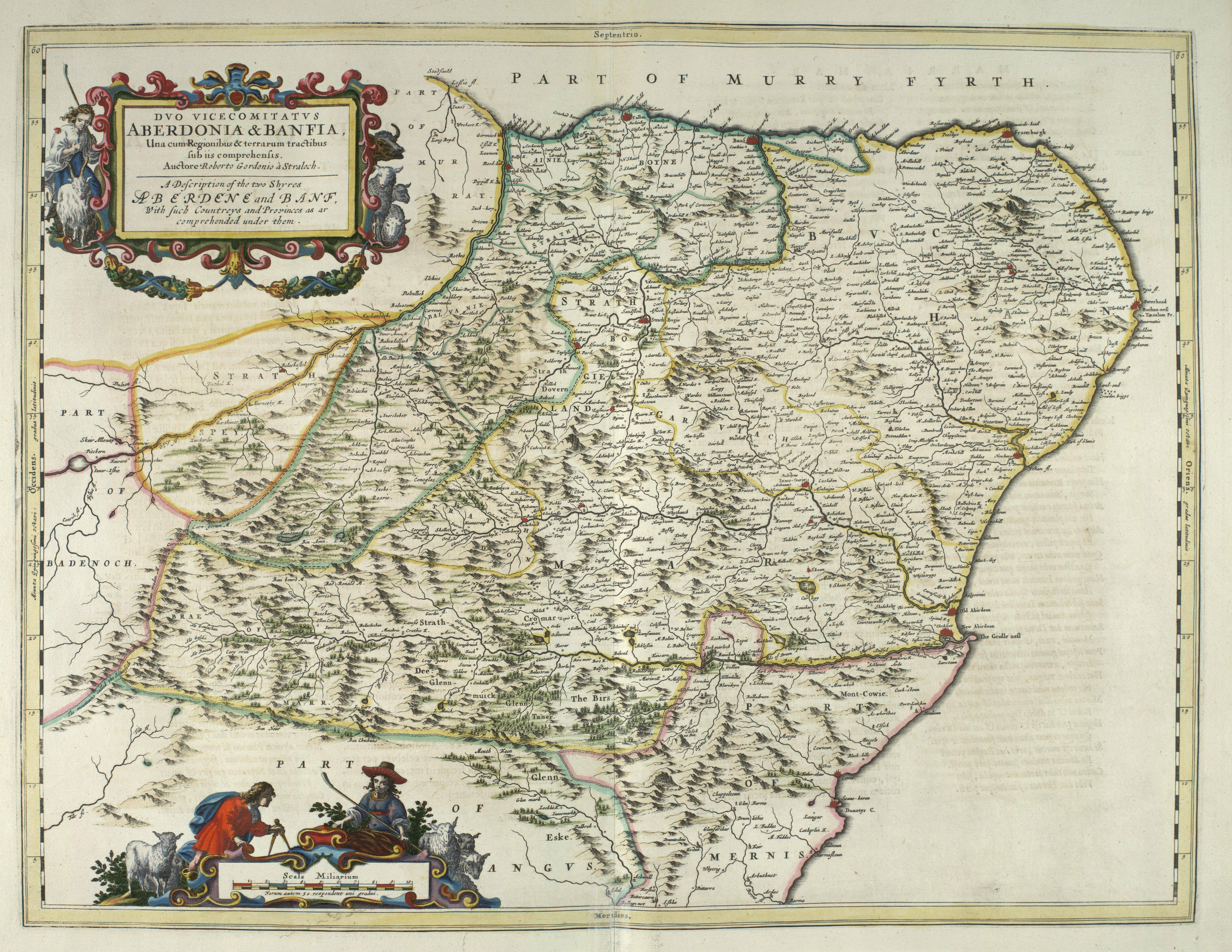
1654 map covering "Aberdonia & Banfia" (Banffshire)

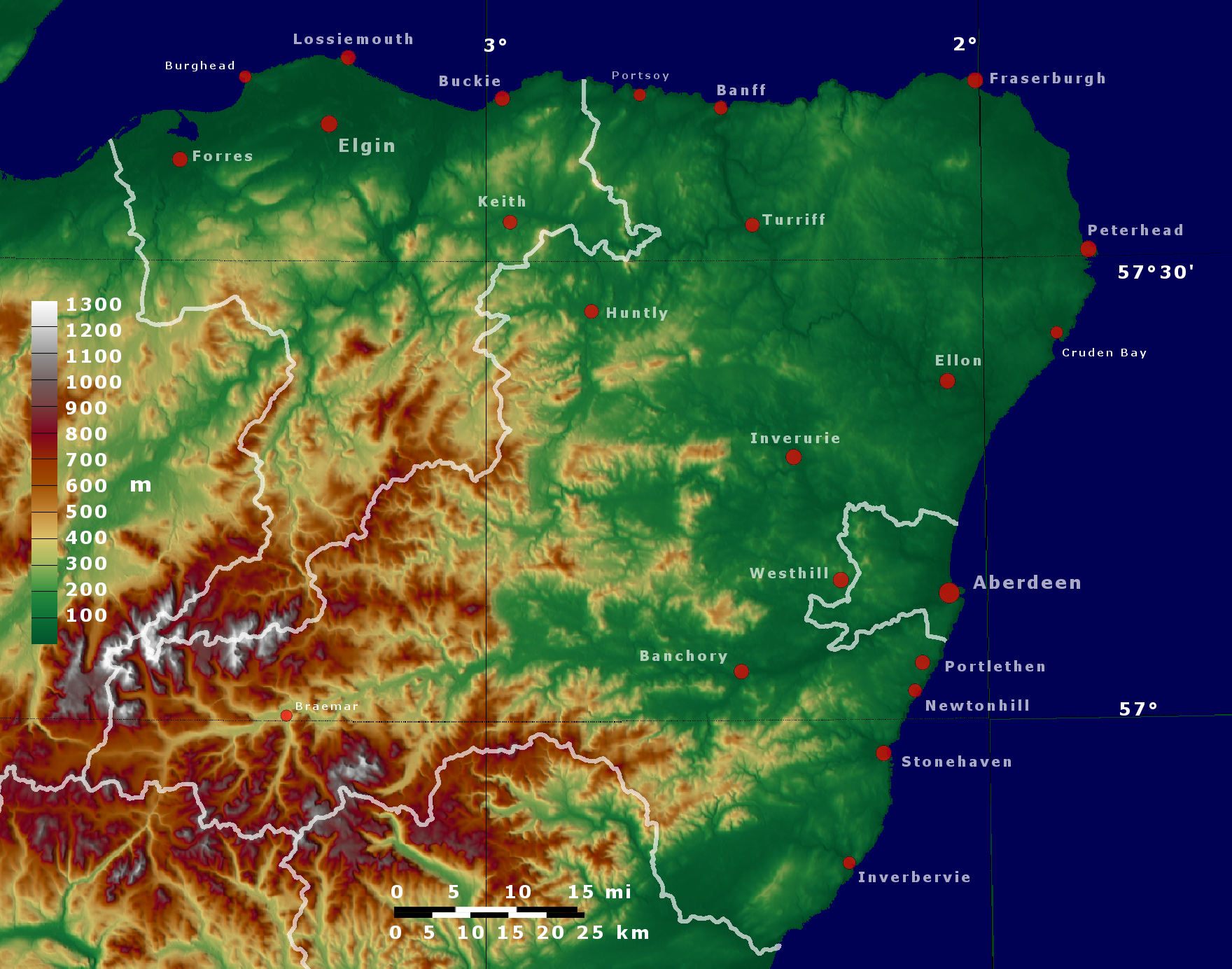
Topographic map of Aberdeenshire and Moray

Aberdeenshire has a rich prehistoric and historical heritage. It is the locus of a large number of Neolithic and Bronze Age archaeological sites, including Longman Hill, Kempstone Hill, Catto Long Barrow and Cairn Lee. The area was settled in the Bronze Age by the Beaker culture, who arrived from the south around 2000–1800 BC. Stone circles and cairns were constructed predominantly in this era. In the Iron Age, hill forts were built.

Around the 1st century AD, the Taexali people, who left little history, were believed to have resided along the coast. The Picts were the next documented inhabitants of the area and were no later than 800–900 AD. The Romans also were in the area during this period, as they left signs at Kintore. Christianity influenced the inhabitants early on, and there were Celtic monasteries at Old Deer and Monymusk.

Since medieval times, there have been many traditional paths that crossed the Mounth (a spur of mountainous land that extends from the higher inland range to the North Sea slightly north of Stonehaven) through present-day Aberdeenshire from the Scottish Lowlands to the Highlands. Some of the most well known and historically important trackways are the Causey Mounth and Elsick Mounth.

Aberdeenshire played an important role in the fighting between the Scottish dynasties. Macbeth fell at Lumphanan in 1057. During the Anglo-Norman penetration, other families arrive, such as House of Balliol, Clan Bruce, and Clan Cumming (Comyn). During the Scottish Wars of Independence, the King of England Edward I travelled across the area twice with his invading army, in 1296 and 1303. In 1307, Robert the Bruce was victorious near Inverurie.

These new families set the stage for the upcoming rivalries during the 14th and 15th centuries. This rivalry grew worse during and after the Protestant Reformation when religion was another reason for conflict between the clans. The Gordon family adhered to Catholicism and the Forbeses to Protestantism. Aberdeenshire was the historic seat of the clan Dempster. Three universities were founded in the area prior to the 17th century, King's College in Old Aberdeen (1494), Marischal College in Aberdeen (1593), and the University of Fraserburgh (1592).

During the 17th century, Aberdeenshire was the location of more fighting, centred on the Marquess of Montrose and the Wars of the Three Kingdoms. This period also saw increased wealth due to the increase in trade with Germany, Poland, and the Low Countries.

After the end of the Revolution of 1688, an extended peaceful period was interrupted only by fleeting events such as the Rising of 1715 and the Rising of 1745. The latter resulted in the end of the ascendancy of Episcopalianism and the feudal power of landowners. An era began of increased agricultural and industrial progress.

The present council area is named after the historic county of Aberdeenshire, which has different boundaries and ceased to be used for local government purposes in 1975 under the Local Government (Scotland) Act 1973. The pre-1975 territory of Aberdeenshire was then split between four of the five new districts in the Grampian region: Banff and Buchan (which also included eastern parts of Banffshire, including its county town of Banff), Gordon, Kincardine and Deeside (which also included most of Kincardineshire), and Aberdeen City. Local government functions were shared between the two levels.

The modern council area was created in 1996 under the Local Government etc. (Scotland) Act 1994. It covers the combined area of the Banff and Buchan, Gordon, and Kincardine and Deeside districts that had been created in 1975. The present Aberdeenshire Council area therefore consists of all of the historic counties of Aberdeenshire and Kincardineshire (except the area of those two counties making up Aberdeen City), as well as the north-east portions of Banffshire.

== Demographics ==
The population of the council area has risen over 50% since 1971 to approximately 265,080 in 2024, representing 4.7% of Scotland's total. Aberdeenshire's population has increased by 9.1% since 2001, while Scotland's total population grew by 3.8%. The census lists a relatively high proportion of under 16s and slightly fewer working-age people compared with the Scottish average.

Aberdeenshire is one of the most homogeneous/indigenous regions of the UK. In 2011, 82.2% of residents identified as 'White Scottish', followed by 12.3% who are 'White British', whilst ethnic minorities constitute only 0.9% of the population. The largest ethnic minority group is Asian Scottish/British at 0.8%. In addition to the English language, 48.8% of residents reported being able to speak and understand the Scots language.

Ethnic Group	2001		2011		2022	
Ethnic Group	Number	%	Number	%	Number	%
White: Total	225,243	99.28%	249,112	98.47%	256,017	97.08%
White: Scottish	194,169	85.59%	207,936	82.20%	210,537	79.83%
White: Other British	26,945	11.88%	31,158	12.32%	32,508	12.33%
White: Irish	976	0.43%	1,162	0.46%	1,493	0.57%
White: Gypsy/Traveller (Note: New category created for the 2011 census)	–	–	175	0.07%	169	0.06%
White: Polish	–	–	3,020	1.19%	3,998	1.52%
White: Other	3,153	1.39%	5,661	2.24%	7,312	2.77%
Asian, Asian Scottish or Asian British: Total	645	0.28%	2,037	0.81%	2,939	1.11%
Asian, Asian Scottish or Asian British: Indian	166	0.07%	473	0.19%	783	0.30%
Asian, Asian Scottish or Asian British: Pakistani	69	–	253	0.10%	343	0.13%
Asian, Asian Scottish or Asian British: Bangladeshi	29	–	138	0.05%	106	–
Asian, Asian Scottish or Asian British: Chinese	277	0.12%	424	0.17%	575	0.22%
Asian, Asian Scottish or Asian British: Asian Other	104	0.05%	749	0.30%	1,135	0.43%
Black, Black Scottish or Black British (Note: Category restructured for the 2011 census)	14	–	–	–	–	–
African: Total	85	–	490	0.19%	1,313	0.50%
African: African, African Scottish or African British	–	–	487	0.19%	88	–
African: Other African	–	–	3	–	1,224	0.46%
Caribbean or Black: Total	–	–	269	0.11%	255	0.10%
Caribbean	82	–	159	0.06%	100	0.04%
Black	–	–	76	–	16	–
Caribbean or Black: Other	–	–	34	–	137	0.05%
Mixed or multiple ethnic groups: Total	463	0.20%	294	0.12%	2,074	0.79%
Other: Total	339	0.15%	294	0.12%	1,122	0.43%
Other: Arab	–	–	131	0.05%	436	0.17%
Other: Any other ethnic group	–	–	163	0.06%	682	0.26%
Total:	226,871	100.00%	252,973	100.00%	263,723	100.00%

=== Languages ===
The 2022 Scottish Census reported that out of 256,382 residents aged three and over, 121,797 (47.5%) considered themselves able to speak or read the Scots language. This is the greatest proportion of Scots speakers of any Scottish council area.

The 2022 Scottish Census reported that out of 256,377 residents aged three and over, 3,579 (1.4%) considered themselves able to speak or read Gaelic.

== Settlements ==
The largest settlements in Aberdeenshire

The largest settlements in Aberdeenshire are:

Settlement	Population	
Settlement	Mid-2010	(2020)
Peterhead	17,790	19,060
Inverurie	11,590	14,660
Fraserburgh	12,540	12,570
Westhill	11,220	12,110
Stonehaven	10,820	11,150
Ellon	9,910	10,070
Portlethen	7,130	8,940
Banchory	7,030	7,440
Kintore	4,180	4,700
Turriff	5,020	4,700
Huntly	4,570	4,550
Banff	3,720	4,000
Kemnay	3,710	3,890
Macduff	3,910	3,830
Laurencekirk	2,650	3,140
Oldmeldrum	2,990	3,120
Blackburn	2,720	3,050
Newtonhill	3,080	3,010
Aboyne	2,440	2,920
Mintlaw	2,610	2,800

== Economy ==
Aberdeenshire's Gross Domestic Product (GDP) is estimated at £3,496M (2011), representing 5.2% of the Scottish total. Aberdeenshire's economy is closely linked to Aberdeen City's (GDP £7,906M), and in 2011, the region as a whole was calculated to contribute 16.8% of Scotland's GDP. Between 2012 and 2014, the combined Aberdeenshire and Aberdeen City economic forecast GDP growth rate is 8.6%, the highest growth rate of any local council area in the UK and above the Scottish rate of 4.8%.

A significant proportion of Aberdeenshire's working residents commute to Aberdeen City for work, varying from 11.5% from Fraserburgh to 65% from Westhill.

Average Gross Weekly Earnings (for full-time employees employed in workplaces in Aberdeenshire in 2011) are £572.60. This is lower than the Scottish average by £2.10 and a fall of 2.6% on the 2010 figure. The average gross weekly pay of people resident in Aberdeenshire is much higher, at £741.90, as many people commute out of Aberdeenshire, principally into Aberdeen City.

Total employment (excluding farm data) in Aberdeenshire is estimated at 93,700 employees (Business Register and Employment Survey 2009). The majority of employees work within the service sector, predominantly in public administration, education and health. Almost 19% of employment is within the public sector. Aberdeenshire's economy remains closely linked to Aberdeen City's and the North Sea oil industry, with many employees in oil-related jobs.

The average monthly unemployment (claimant count) rate for Aberdeenshire in 2011 was 1.5%. This is lower than the average rate of Aberdeen City (2.3%), Scotland (4.2%) and the UK (3.8%).

== Major industries ==
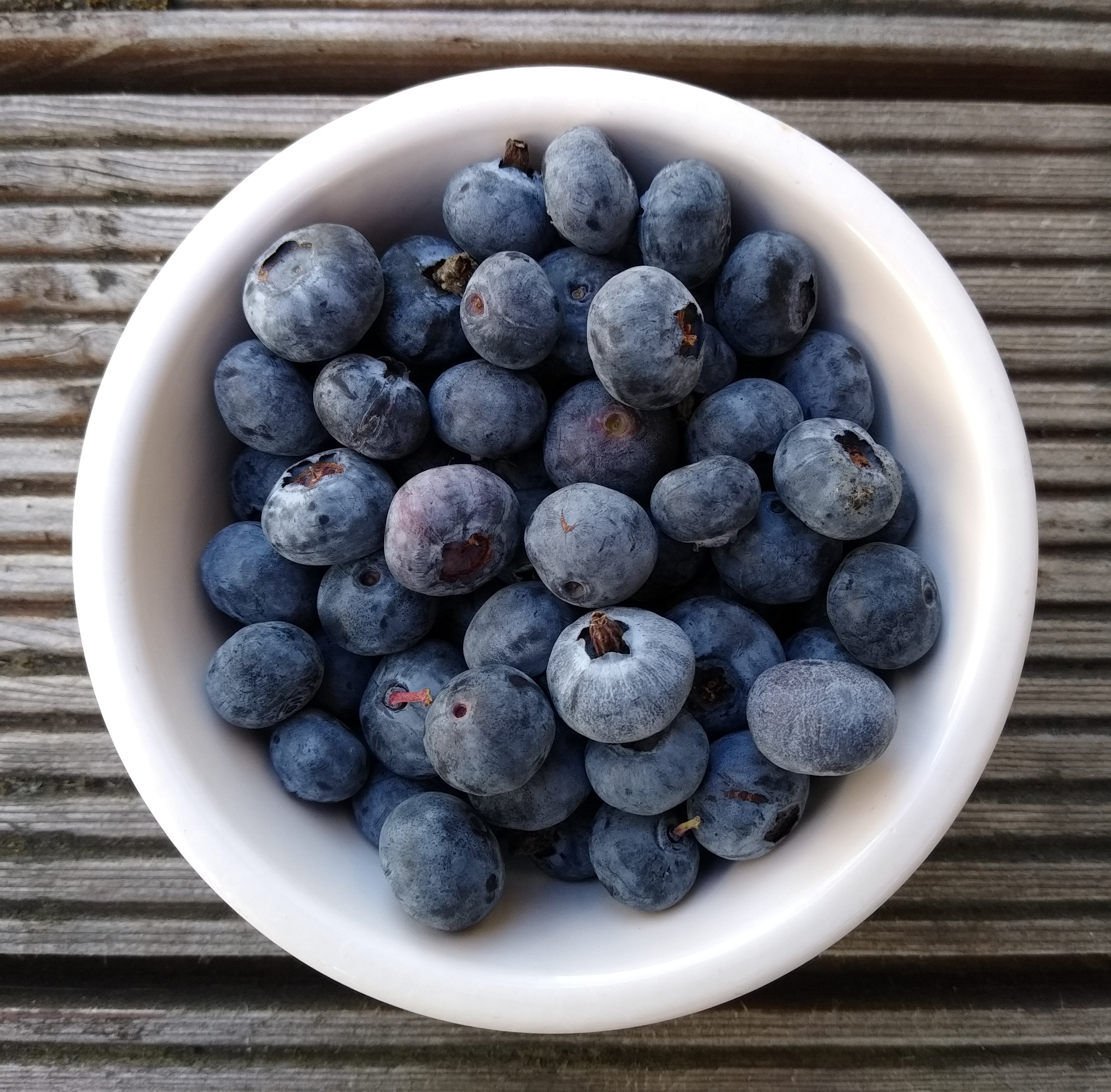
Blueberries grown in Aberdeenshire

- Energy – There are significant energy-related infrastructure, presence, and expertise in Aberdeenshire. Peterhead is an important centre for the energy industry. Peterhead Port includes an extensive new quay with an adjacent laydown area at Smith Quay, is a major support location for North Sea oil and gas exploration and production and the fast-growing global sub-sea sector. The Gas Terminal at St Fergus handles around 15% of the UK's natural gas requirements, and the Peterhead power station is looking to host Britain's first carbon capture and storage power generation project. There are numerous offshore wind turbines near the coast.
- Fishing – Aberdeenshire is Scotland's foremost fishing area. In 2010, catches landed at Aberdeenshire's ports accounted for over half the total fish landings in Scotland and almost 45% in the UK. Along with Aberdeen City, Peterhead and Fraserburgh ports provide much employment in these sectors. The River Dee is also rich in salmon.
- Agriculture – Aberdeenshire is rich in arable land, with an estimated 9,000 people employed in the sector, and is best known for rearing livestock, mainly cattle. Sheep are important in the higher ground.
- Tourism – this sector continues to grow, with a range of sights to be seen in the area. From the lively Cairngorm Mountain range to the bustling fishing ports on the northeast coast, Aberdeenshire samples a bit of everything. Aberdeenshire also has a rugged coastline and many sandy beaches and is a hot spot for tourist activity throughout the year. Almost 1.3 million tourists visited the region in 2011 – up 3% on the previous year.
- Whisky distilling is still a practised art in the area.

== Wider politics ==
=== Referendums ===
In the 2014 Scottish independence referendum, Aberdeenshire voted 'No' by a percentage of 60.4%.

In the 2016 European Union membership referendum, Aberdeenshire voted 'Remain' by the third lowest margin of 55.0%. First and second lowest margin for 'Remain' were Moray (50.1%) and Dumfries and Galloway (53.1%).

== Notable features ==
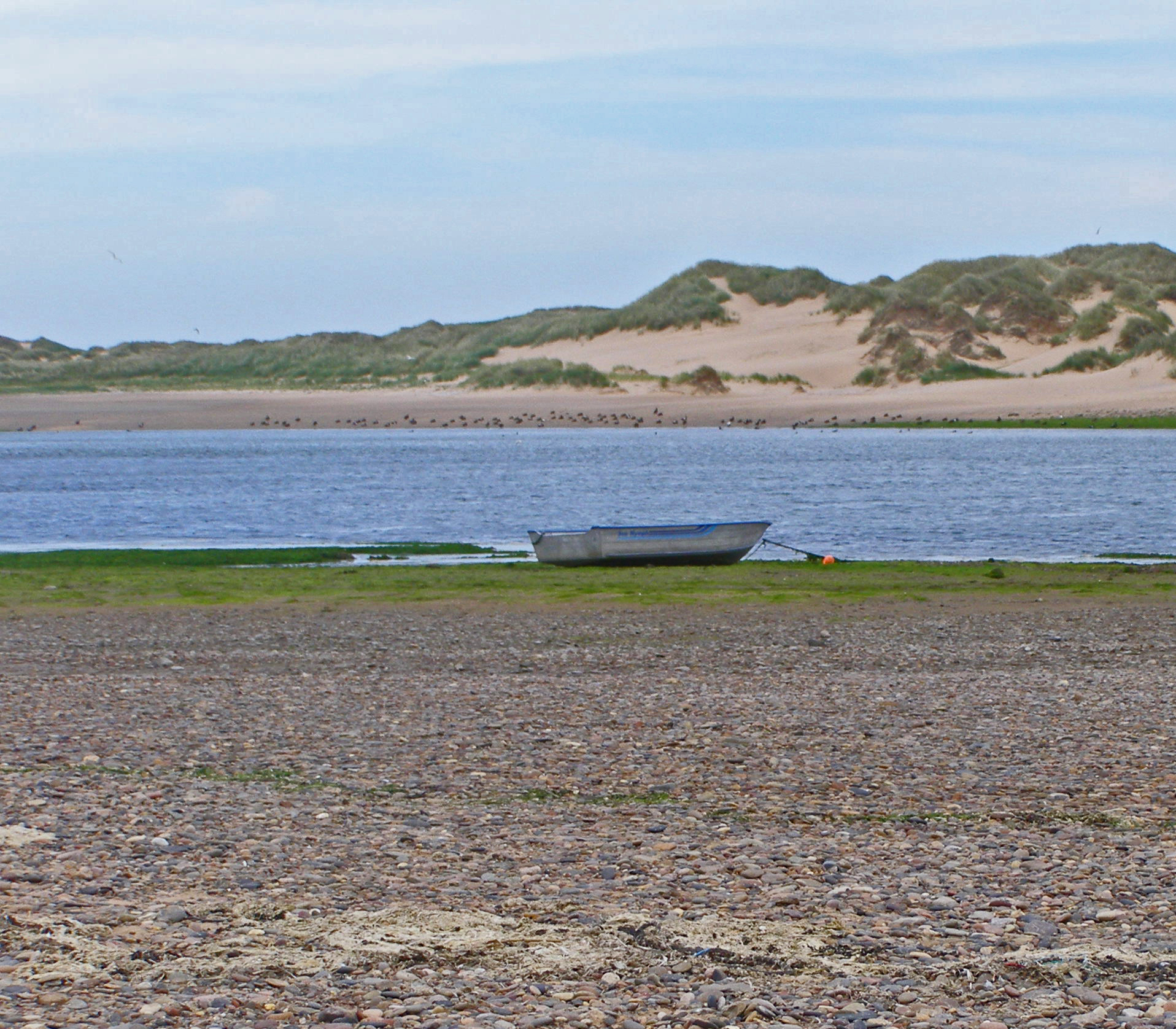
Ythan Estuary nature reserve, with tern colonies and dunes in background

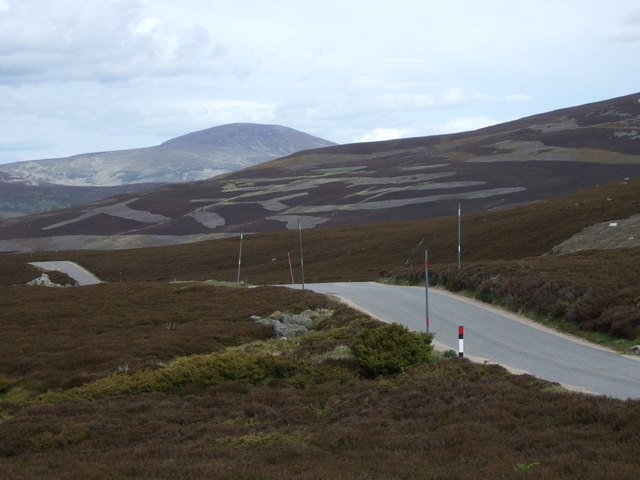
The B976 road near Gairnshiel

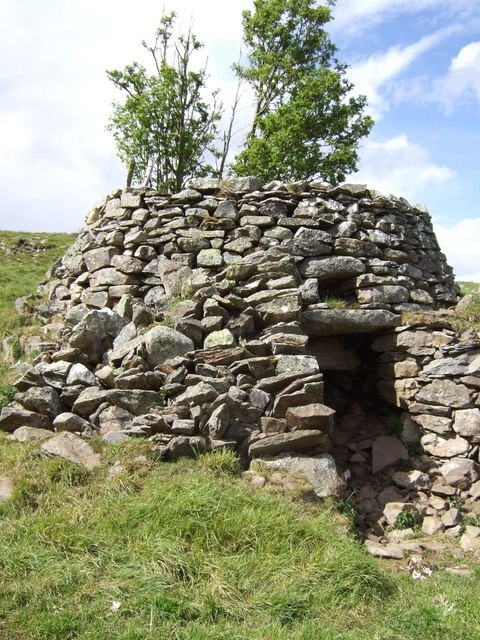
An old lime kiln at Badenyon

The following significant structures or places are within Aberdeenshire:

- Balmoral Castle, Scottish Highland residence of the British royal family.
- Bennachie
- Burn O'Vat
- Cairness House
- Cairngorms National Park
- Corgarff Castle
- Crathes Castle
- Causey Mounth, an ancient road
- Drum Castle
- Dunnottar Castle
- Fetteresso Castle
- Fowlsheugh Nature Reserve
- Haddo House
- Herscha Hill
- Huntly Castle
- Kildrummy Castle
- Loch of Strathbeg
- Lochnagar
- Monboddo House
- Muchalls Castle
- Pitfour estate
- Portlethen Moss
- Raedykes Roman Camp
- River Dee
- River Don
- Sands of Forvie Nature Reserve
- Slains Castles, Old and New
- Stonehaven Tolbooth
- Ythan Estuary Nature Reserve
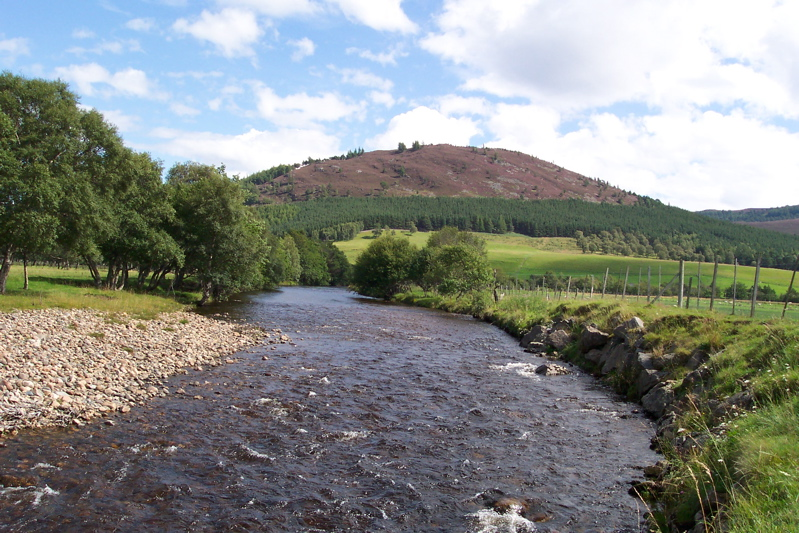
  The Dee, Aberdeenshire's longest river

== Hydrology and climate ==
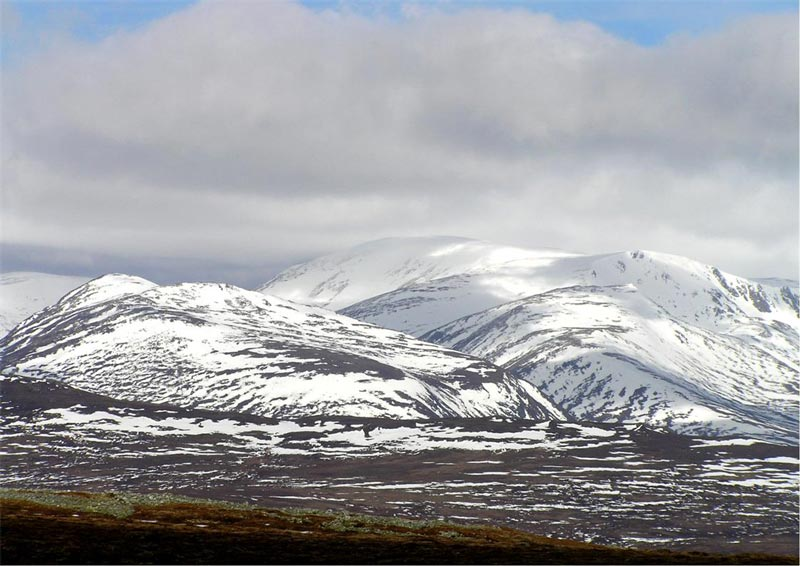
Ben Macdui, the United Kingdom's second-highest mountain

There are numerous rivers and burns in Aberdeenshire, including Cowie Water, Carron Water, Burn of Muchalls, River Dee, River Don, River Ury, River Ythan, Water of Feugh, Burn of Myrehouse, Laeca Burn and Luther Water. Numerous bays and estuaries are found along the seacoast of Aberdeenshire, including Banff Bay, Ythan Estuary, Stonehaven Bay and Thornyhive Bay. Aberdeenshire has a marine west coast climate on the Köppen climate classification.

Aberdeenshire is in the rain shadow of the Grampians, therefore it has a generally dry climate for a maritime region, with portions of the coast receiving 25 inches (64 cm) of moisture annually. Summers are mild, and winters are typically cold in Aberdeenshire; Coastal temperatures are moderated by the North Sea such that coastal areas are typically cooler in the summer and warmer in the winter than inland locations. Coastal areas are also subject to haar, or coastal fog.

== Notable residents ==
- John Skinner, (1721–1807) author, poet and ecclesiastic.
- Hugh Mercer, (1726–1777), born in the manse of Pitsligo Kirk, near Rosehearty, brigadier general of the Continental Army.
- Alexander Garden, (1730–1791), born in Birse, was a naturalist and physician who moved to North America in 1754. The gardenia flower is named in his honour.
- John Kemp, (1763–1812), born in Auchlossan, was a noted educator at Columbia University who is said to have influenced DeWitt Clinton's opinions and policies.
- George MacDonald (1824–1905), author, poet, and theologian born and raised in Huntly.
- Dame Evelyn Glennie, born and raised in Ellon on 19 July 1965, musician.
- Evan Duthie, (born 2000), DJ and producer.
- Peter Nicol, born in Inverurie on 5 April 1973, is a former professional squash player who represented first Scotland and then England in international squash.
- Peter Shepherd, (1841–1879), Surgeon Major, Royal Army Medical Corps
- Johanna Basford (born 1983), illustrator and textile designer
- Iona Fyfe (born 1998), singer and musician.
- Robert Henderson (1902–1999) physician and developer of the first British iron lung.
