= Cove Bay =

Suburb of Aberdeen, Scotland

Coordinates: 57.105°N 2.089°W

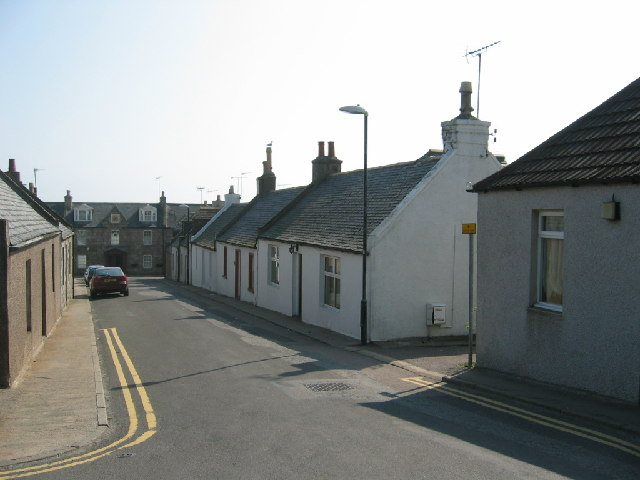
- Old fishermen's cottages in Cove

- Location within the City of Aberdeen
- Population: 8,170 (2020)
- OS grid reference: NJ946015
- Council area: Aberdeen
- Lieutenancy area: Aberdeen
- Country: Scotland
- Sovereign state: United Kingdom
- Post town: ABERDEEN
- Postcode district: AB12 3
- Dialling code: 01224
- Police: Scotland
- Fire: Scottish
- Ambulance: Scottish
- UK Parliament: Aberdeen South
- Scottish Parliament: Aberdeen South and North Kincardine

Cove Bay, or simply Cove, is a suburb on the south-east edge of Aberdeen, Scotland.

Today Cove is home to around 8,000 people. It is a popular residential location owing to its village-like status. It is a quiet suburb at the Southern edge of Aberdeen City and in 2020 won the Silver Gilt award for Scotland in Bloom. Altens and Tullos Industrial Estates offer nearby employment opportunities. There is also easy access to the new AWPR A90.

== History ==
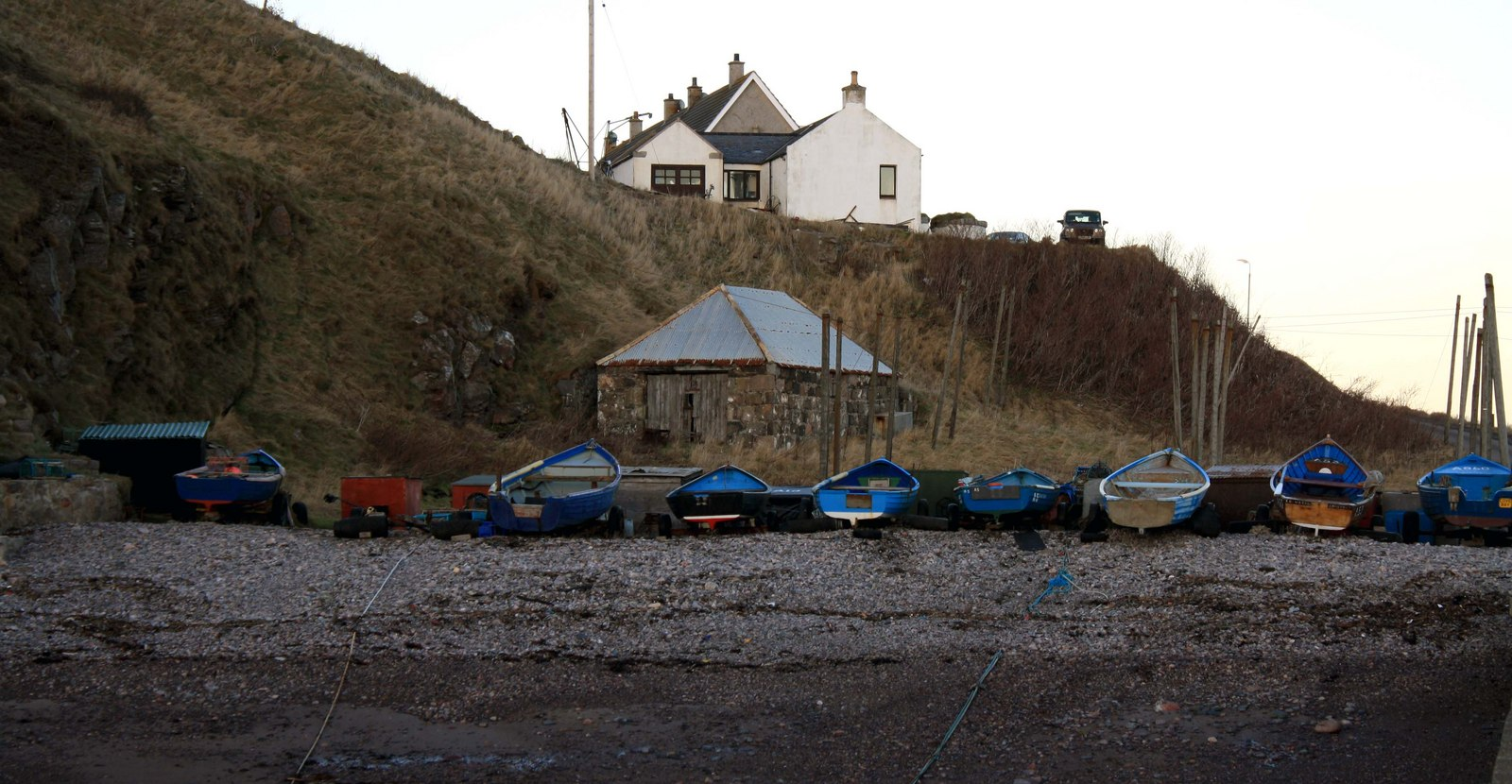
Cove harbour

Cove Bay is situated to the east of the ancient Causey Mounth, which road was built on high ground to make passable this only available medieval route from coastal points south from Stonehaven to Aberdeen. This ancient trackway specifically connected the River Dee crossing (where the Bridge of Dee is located) via Portlethen Moss, Muchalls Castle and Stonehaven to the south. The route was that taken by William Keith, 7th Earl Marischal and the Marquess of Montrose, who led a Covenanter army of 9000 men in the battle of the Civil War in 1639.

Historically in the extreme north-east corner of Kincardineshire, until 1975 it was governed from the county town of Stonehaven, when it was added to the City of Aberdeen district. Though simply referred to as Cove, in the 19th and early 20th centuries it was known as The Cove, becoming Cove Bay around 1912.

Cove Bay railway station opened in 1850 and operated until 1956 for passengers and 1964 for goods. The line remains in use and is now part of the Dundee–Aberdeen line.

St Mary's Church was opened in 1864, and also served as the local boys' school until the 1890s when Cove School was built nearby. Cove School closed in 1981, when the newer Loirston Primary School was opened, becoming a community centre known as Loirston Annexe.

In 2019, 5 cairns were erected with information plaques detailing the history of Cove Bay and Altens as a farming community. This was made possible with a donation from the late Margaret Allan, whose family occupied the Mains of Loirston farm, and latterly Sergent's Croft.

=== Industry ===
Cove has been noted for industries such as granite, which was quarried in several locations to the south of the village. Owing to its close-grained texture, Cove granite was one of the hardest in north-east Scotland and proved highly resistant to frost, making it ideal for causeway stones used in the construction of roads. It was widely exported to cities in England, including Billingsgate Market in London.

=== Fishing ===
The village itself sprung up around the fishing industry, with the boats berthed on a shingle beach, a gap in the rocks that afforded a natural harbour. During this time, it is estimated that approximately 300 people lived in the area. In the mid 19th century the fishing was at its height, which, over years, has included cod, haddock, salmon, herring and shellfish. The piers and breakwater were constructed in 1878.At present only a couple of boats pursue shellfish on a part-time basis.

The Annual Reports of the Fishery Board for Scotland provide an insight into the fishing in Cove in the years before the First World War. The summary for 1900 also applies to Downies and Portlethen: "These three fishing villages, almost solely dependent on the line fishing, are unfortunately falling behind. The combinded catch, when compared with the preceding year, shows a decline of 803 Cwts and £503. Fish are scarce on the inshore grounds and small generally. As at best the men are now only making a precarious living, they are gradually leaving the villages and taking up residence in Aberdeen. The fishermens's wives, who hawk the fish, are amiable helpmates in the struggle. Cove harbour and several of the boats there were wrecked in the gale of February. Since then the harbour has been repaired. Fishing goes on in a small way, but the prospects are anything but bright."

Fishery Statistics

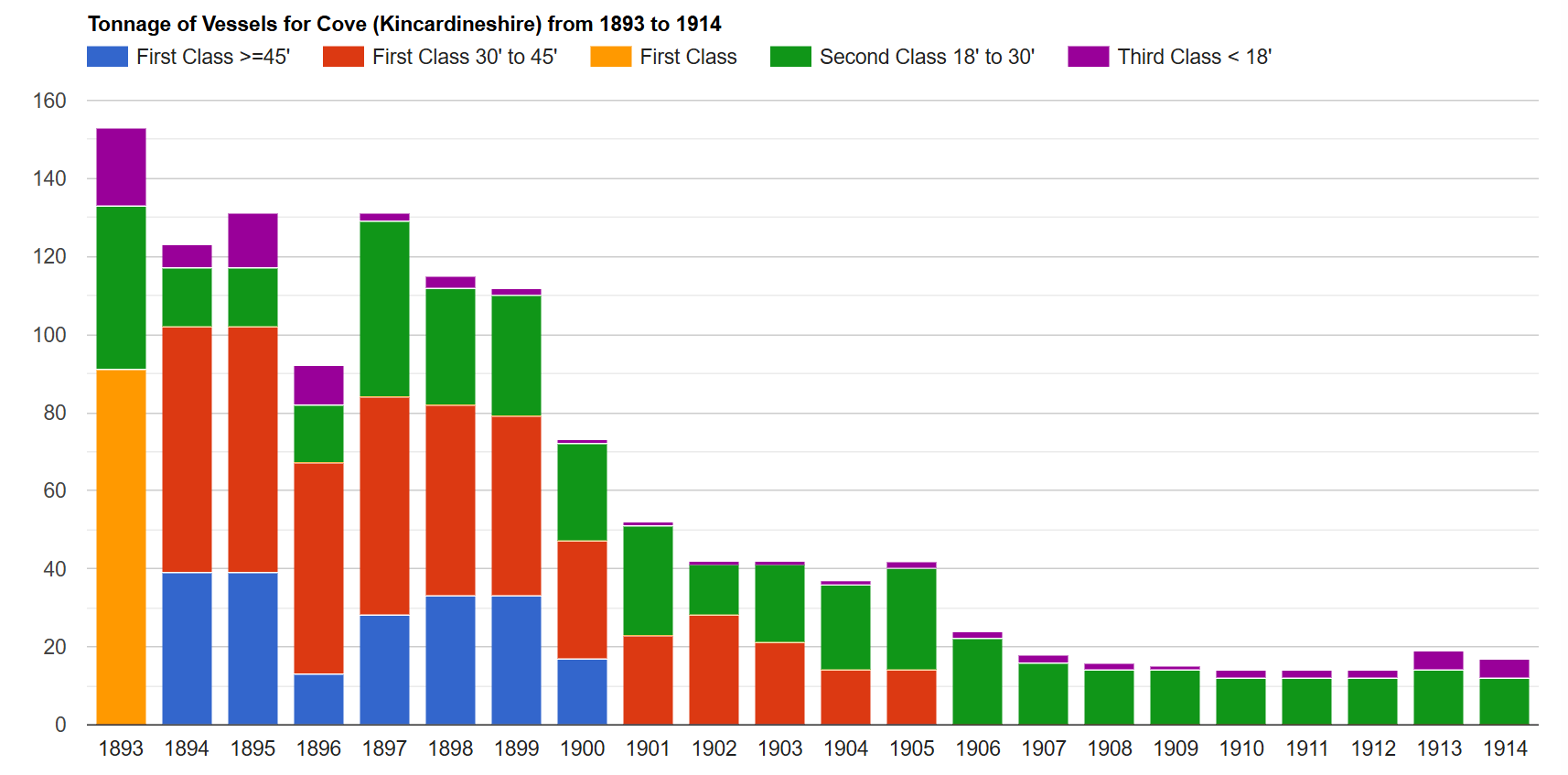
Tonnage of vessels

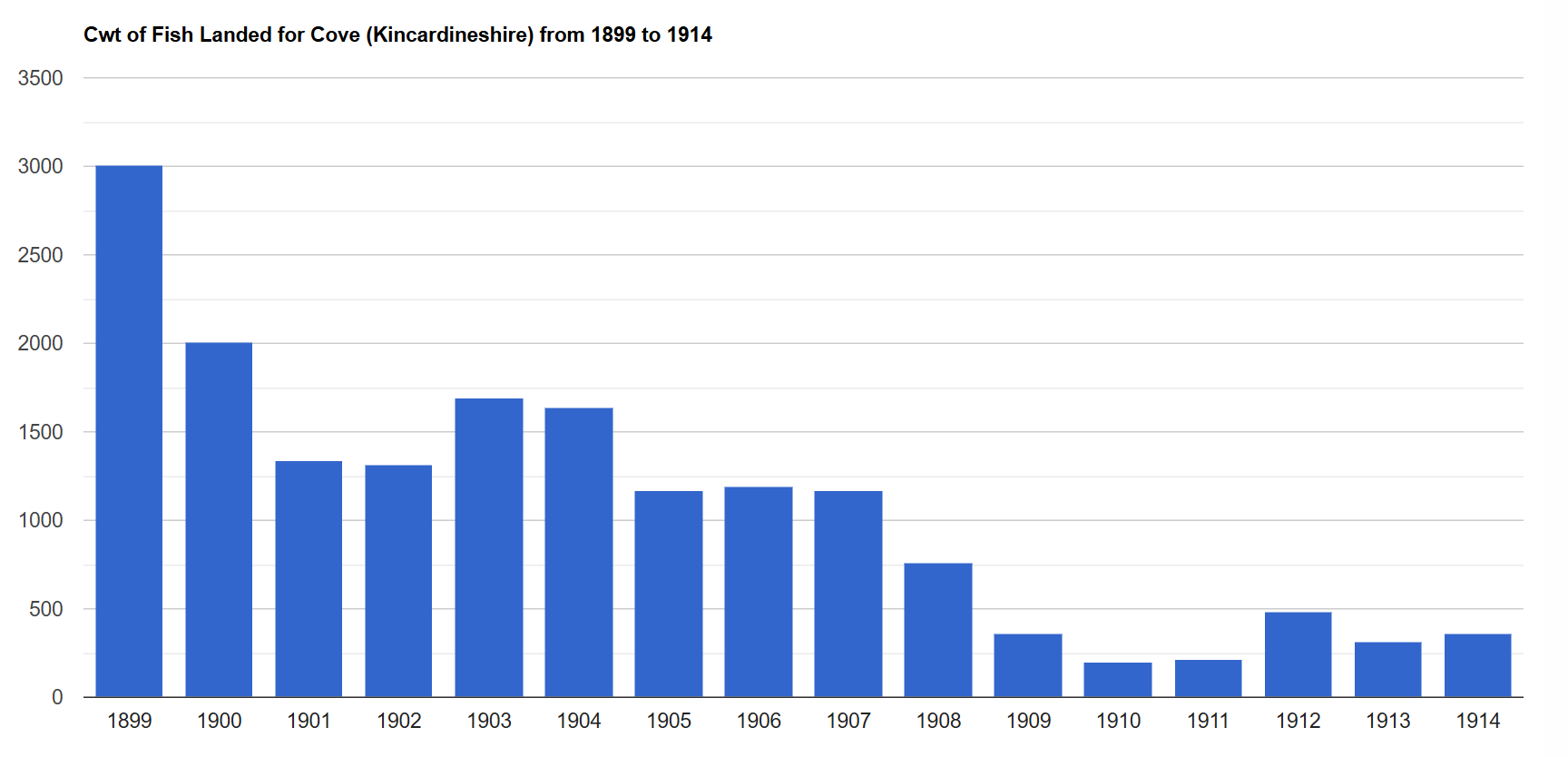
Cwt of fish landed

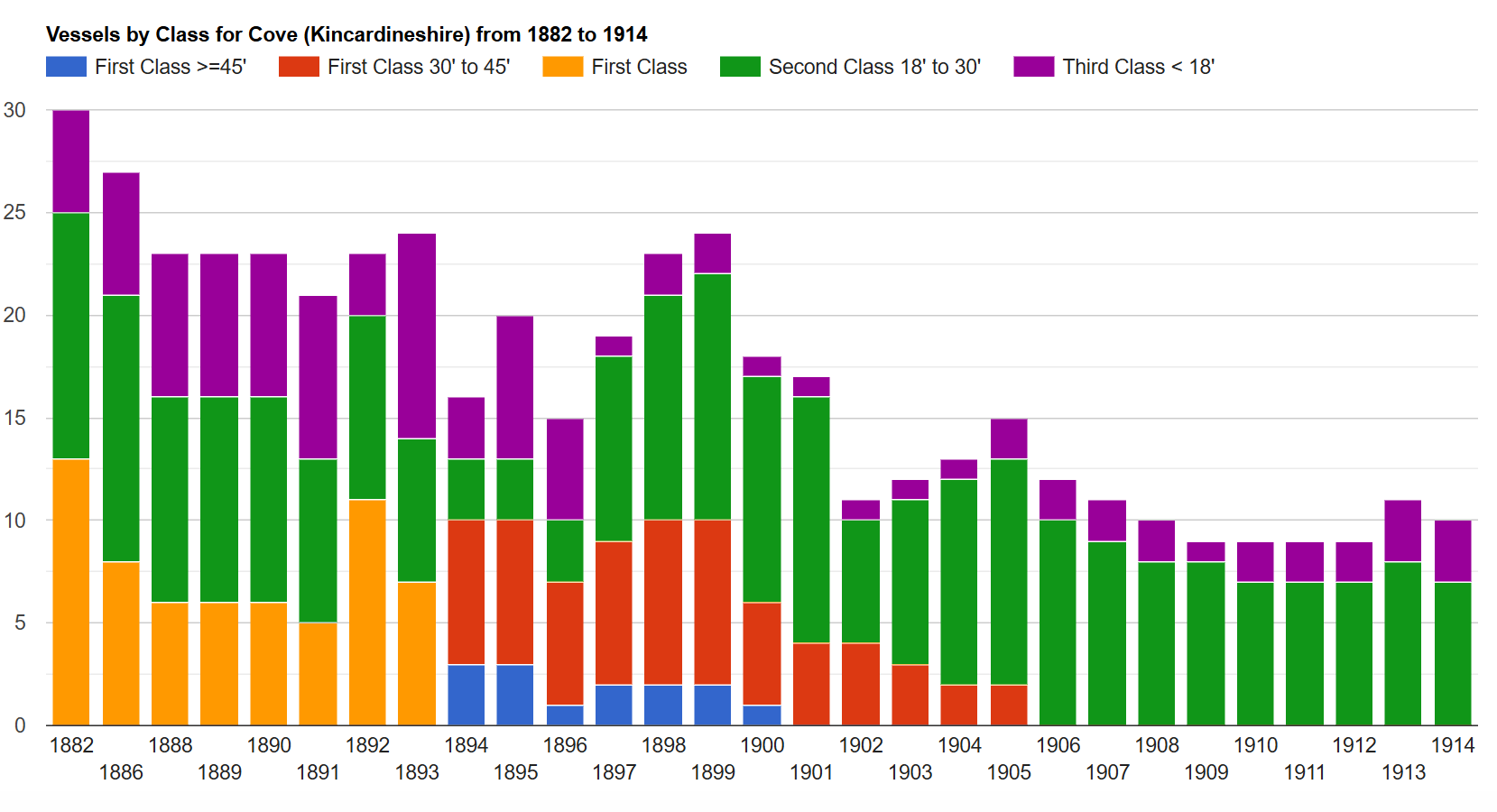
Vessels by class

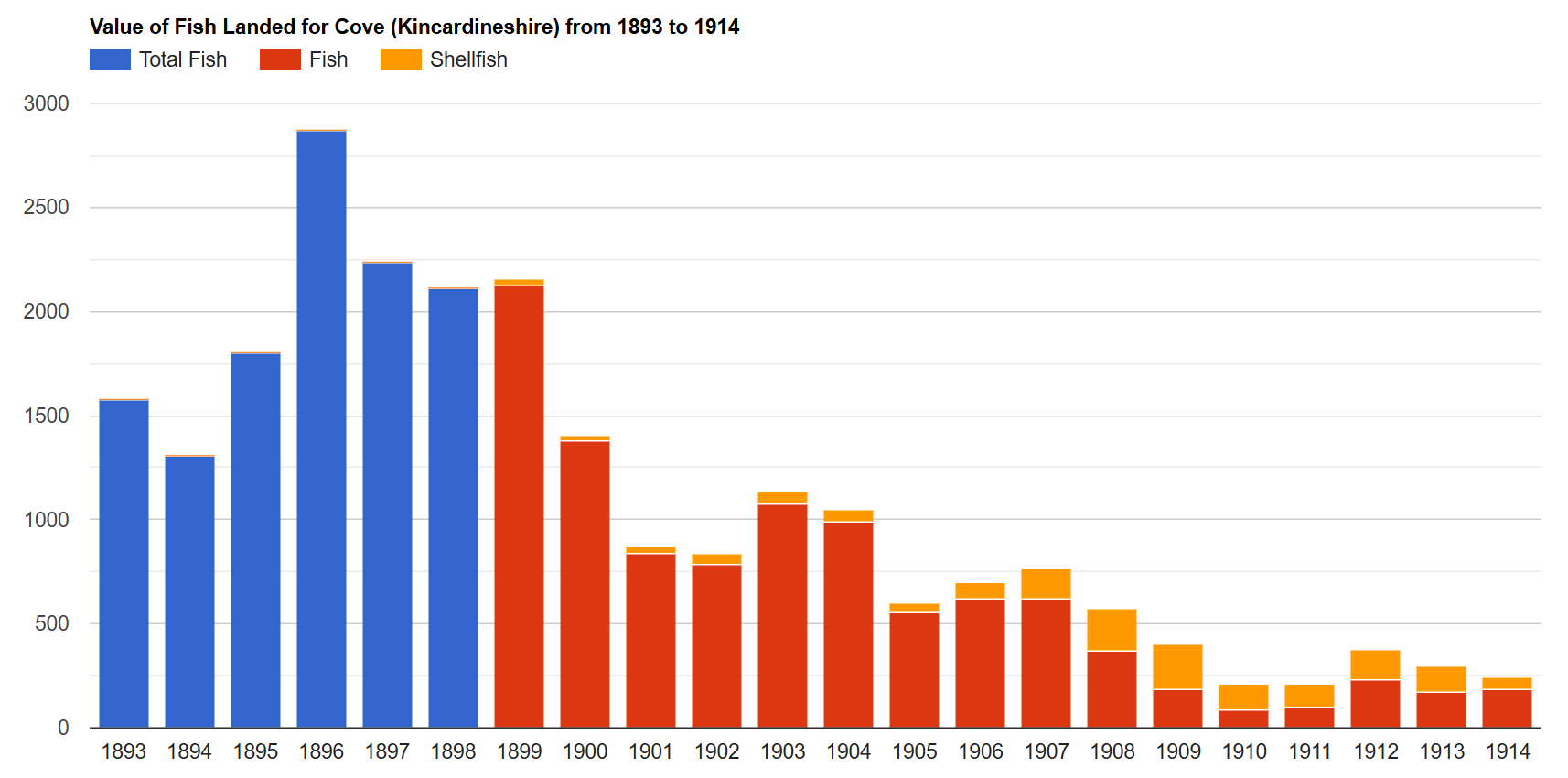
Value (£) of fish landed

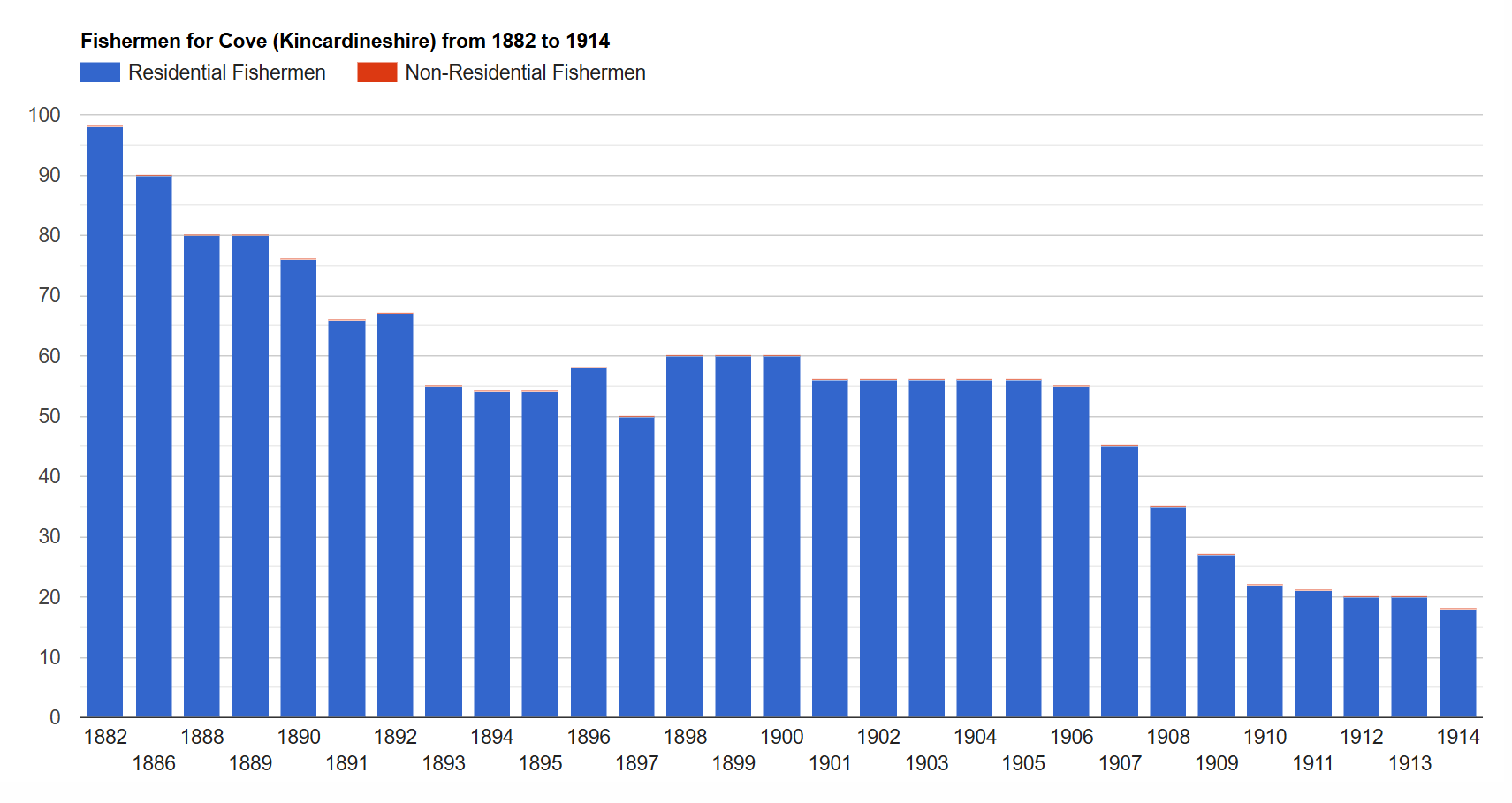
Fishermen

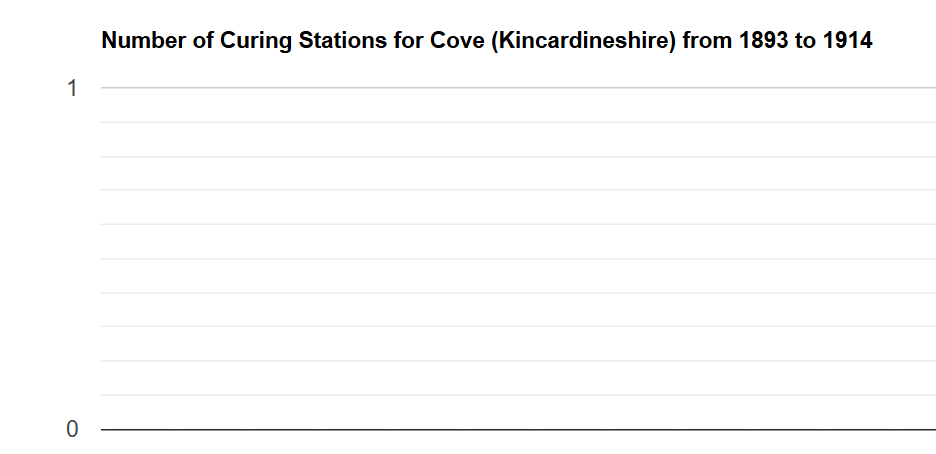
Placeholder - no curing stations

Cove Bay harbour has been the centre of a legal battle between a local landowner, who purchased part of the harbour in 2001, and the local fishermen who use the harbour. Attempts were made by the landowner to get the fishermen to remove their boats, as the shore was now considered private land meaning the fishermen could no longer store their equipment and boats on the shore. This legal battle ended in 2018, with the landowner succeeding. Public right of way for vehicles and pedestrians is maintained down Balmoral Terrace, leading to the harbour, and the pier itself.

In 2019, many of the remaining boats on the shore and the storage shed were set ablaze in what was thought to be a deliberate arson attack.

Between 1894 and 1937, Cove also housed a fishmeal factory, the Aberdeen Fish Meal Factory, which was located at the edge of the cliffs. It produced quality manure which was exported to both Europe and America. It became locally known as "the stinker" because of the processing odour, which was highlighted by the Aberdeen entertainer Harry Gordon in a parody entitled A Song of Cove.

== Amenities ==
=== Transport ===
A bus service to and from Cove and the wider area of Aberdeen is available. This is run by First Aberdeen with the numbers 3, 3A and 3B, which operates within Aberdeen City boundaries. An additional service, the 21A, is run on school days for pupils attending Lochside Academy. A separate service, ran by Stagecoach, runs the number 7 and 8 service to Portlethen, Newtonhill, and Stonehaven.

=== Healthcare ===
Cove Bay has its own medical centre which also has an NHS dental practice, the Cove Bay Medical Centre. Originally located on Catto Walk, moved to a new facility accessed from Earns Heugh Road. Bupa Dental Care Cove Bay has since moved into the old surgery building on Catto Walk.

=== Sport ===
There is a new Balmoral Stadium in Cove located beside Wellington Circle that replaced the now demolished Allan Park. Cove is currently home to two football teams: Cove Rangers, who currently play in the Scottish League One and Cove Thistle, who hold amateur status. Sunday amateur team Cove Revolution folded in 2010. There are also many youth teams in the area that are run by Cove Youth FC. The Cove Youth FC area SFA credited community club, organizing players from 6 years old up to 19 years old. They also have a girls section. The Cove Community Football Trust is run by Cove Rangers FC, Cove Thistle FC and Cove Youth FC.

=== Recreational Grounds ===
Catto Park, situated along Cove Road next to the Loirston Annexe, contains a small children's play park towards the east. The grass pitch is often used for football games and dog walkers.

In 2018, 16 acres of land to the south of Cove Crescent was purchased for £10,000 by the Cove Woodland Trust. As of 2023, over 4,000 trees have been planted in the Cove Community Woodland. There are several wooden chainsaw sculptures throughout the site, many depicting fantasy creatures such as dragons and elves. These were created by Dervish Carving. Two Péntanque courts have been built on the grounds. There is also a small play area. The woodland is popular with dog walkers, and also hosts many community events.

A private allotment site, Nether Loirston Growers Association, is located behind the Altens Community Centre. This was created in 2010 with the help of the Scottish Government Climate Change Fund and Aberdeen City Council. The land is leased to the association by the council. Members of the association are from the local community, and encourage community engagement.

=== Other Amenities ===
A state-of-the-art library was built in 2006 between Loirston Primary School and the Cove Shopping Centre.

A community centre, the Loirston Annexe, is located next to Catto Park. This is often used for events and private hire.

== Education ==
Cove has two primary schools, Charleston Primary School (opened 2001) and Loirston Primary School (opened 1981). Most secondary pupils attend the nearby Lochside Academy, but some choose to go to Portlethen Academy. Charleston Primary school also contains a nursery. There is also a private nursery located next to Catto Park.

== Future developments ==
=== Aberdeen Gateway ===
Construction on a new Aberdeen Gateway industrial development began in 2008. New offices and industrial units have been built to the south of the village. Current tenants at the site include well decommissioning specialists Well-Safe Solutions, National Oilwell Varco (NOV), Driving Standards Agency and Hydrasun. A community football pitch is also included within the development.

In 2020, a transport study was conducted for the Aberdeen to Laurencekirk A90 corridor, with local Cove residents showing support for the re-opening of Cove Bay railway station.

== See also ==
- Banchory-Devenick
- Hare Ness
- Nigg
