= Cammachmore Bay =

Embayment of the North Sea

Coordinates: 57.048°N 2.121°W

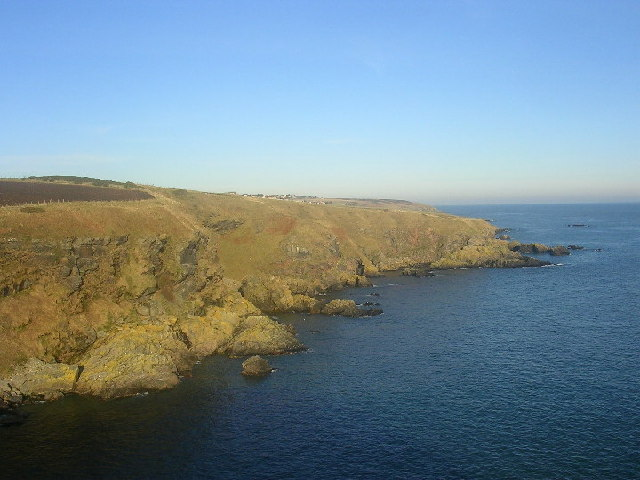
Cliffs at Cammachmore Bay

Cammachmore Bay is an embayment of the North Sea between Stonehaven and Aberdeen in Aberdeenshire, Scotland. The fishing village of Downies is situated on Cammachmore Bay. Cammachmore is noted for its bouldering and rock climbing opportunities.

== History ==
Since prehistoric times the locale above Cammachmore Bay has been an area of human occupation with surviving monuments such as Old Bourtreebush stone circle. There is also considerable medieval history associated with this monument's position along the ancient Causey Mounth trackway. This old drovers' road was constructed on high ground to make passable this only available medieval route from coastal points south from Stonehaven to Aberdeen. This trackway specifically connected the River Dee crossing (where the present Bridge of Dee is situated) via Portlethen Moss, Muchalls Castle and Stonehaven to the south. The route was that taken by William Keith, 7th Earl Marischal and the Marquess of Montrose when they led a Covenanter army of 9000 men in the battle of the Civil War in 1639.

== See also ==
- Portlethen Village
