= Downies =

Cliff-top village in Aberdeenshire, Scotland

Coordinates: 57°02′N 2°07′W

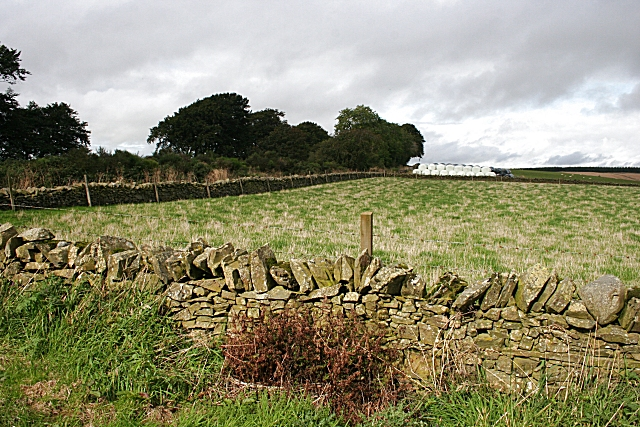

Downies is a cliff-top village in Aberdeenshire, Scotland situated on Cammachmore Bay. Historically Downies was a fishing village, until much of the local North Sea fishery collapsed from overfishing; presently Downies is chiefly a residential dormitory adjunct to the city of Aberdeen.

== Local area history ==
The local area of Downies was first recorded in medieval history in association with the Causey Mounth. Downies is positioned somewhat east with respect to the ancient Causey Mounth trackway, which route was constructed on high ground to render this only available medieval route from coastal points south from Stonehaven to Aberdeen. This passage specifically connected the River Dee crossing (where the present Bridge of Dee is situated) via Portlethen Moss, Muchalls Castle and Stonehaven to the south. The route was that taken by William Keith, 7th Earl Marischal and the Marquess of Montrose when they led a Covenanter army of 9000 soldiers in the first battle of the Civil War in the year 1639.

== Fishing ==
The Annual Reports of the Fishery Board for Scotland provide an insight into the fishing in Downies in the years before the First World War. The summary for 1901 also applies to Cove and Portlethen: "Haddock fishing by means of small boats is still prosecuted from these villages and is almost the only means of subsistence. The position of the industry here reflects the state of things which existed before the introduction of trawling, with this difference, however, that now the fish have become scarce on the foreshore, and the aggreegate catch has suffered such a decline, that the men can barely make a living. There is no prospect of improvement, and the result is that the young and able-bodied are gradually falling out of the ranks of line fishermen."

Fishery Statistics

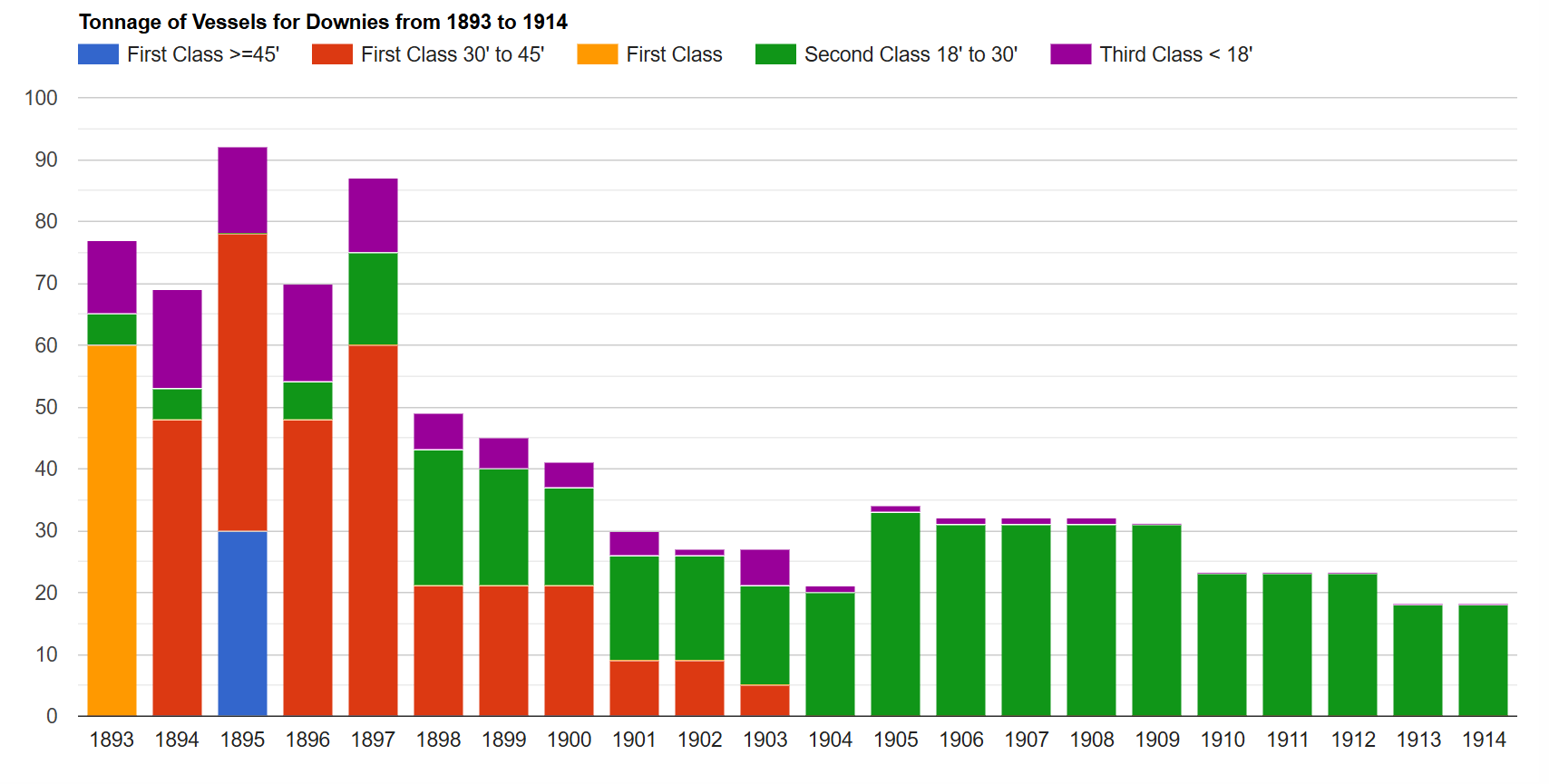
Tonnage of vessels

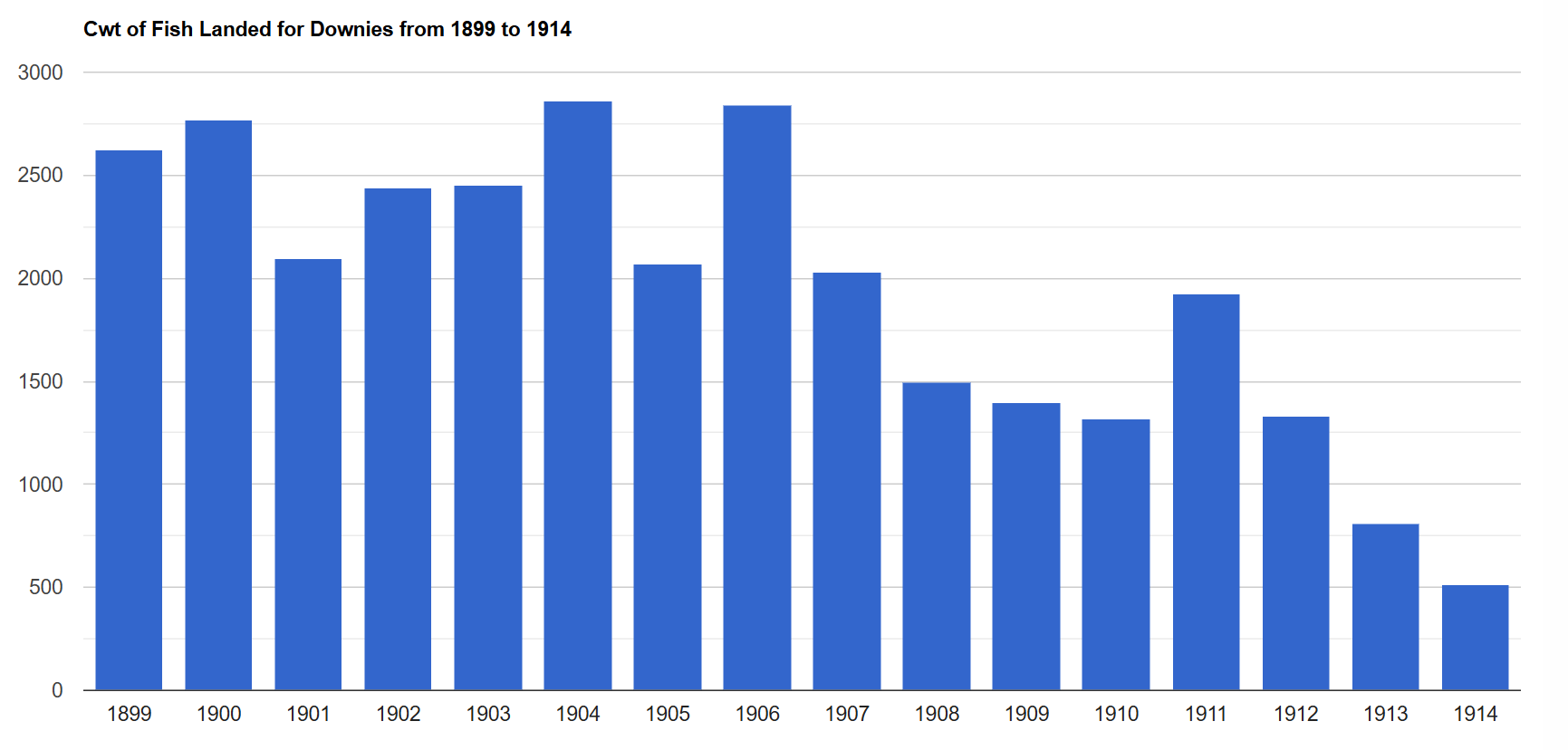
Cwt of fish landed

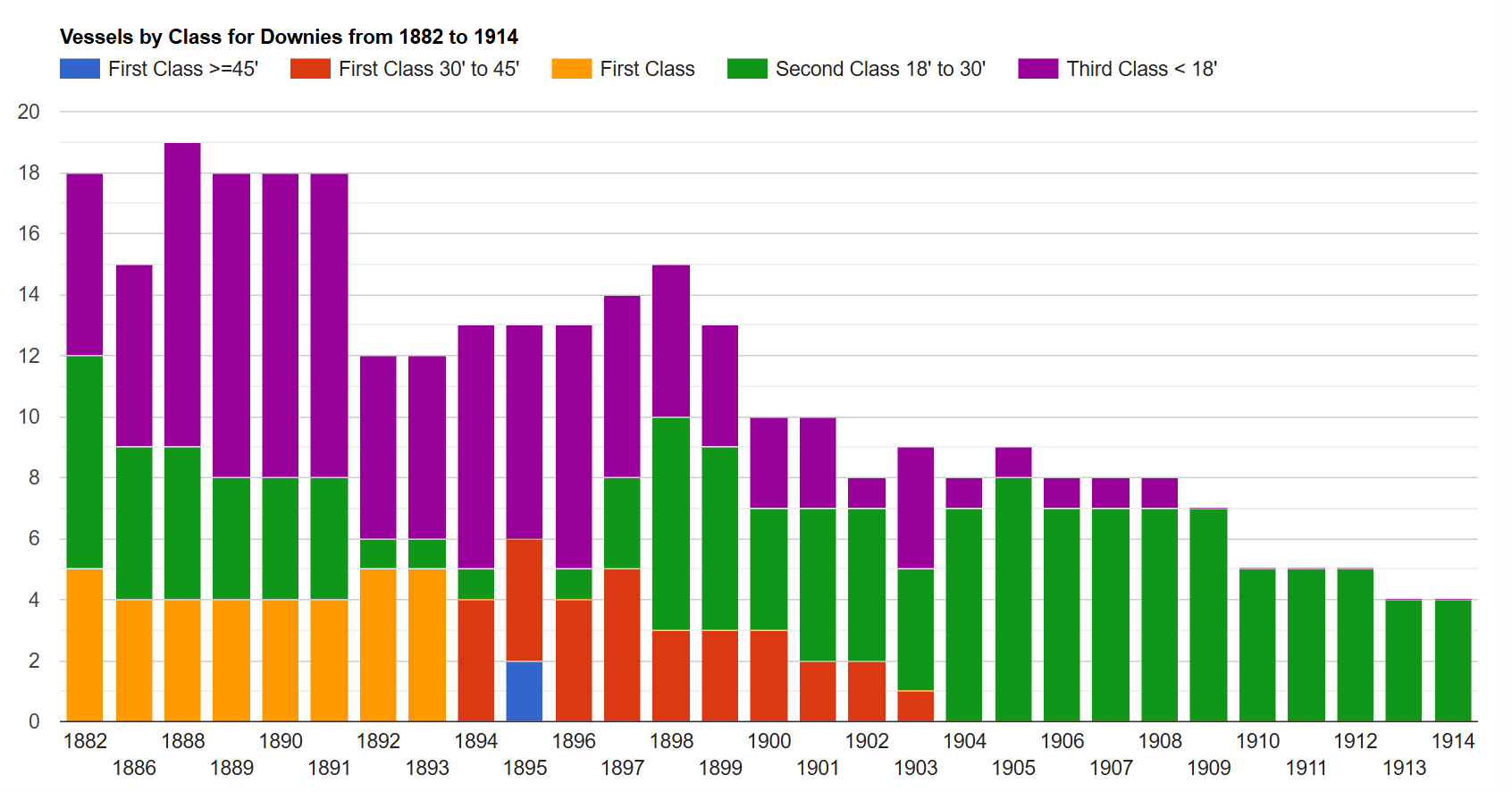
Vessels by class

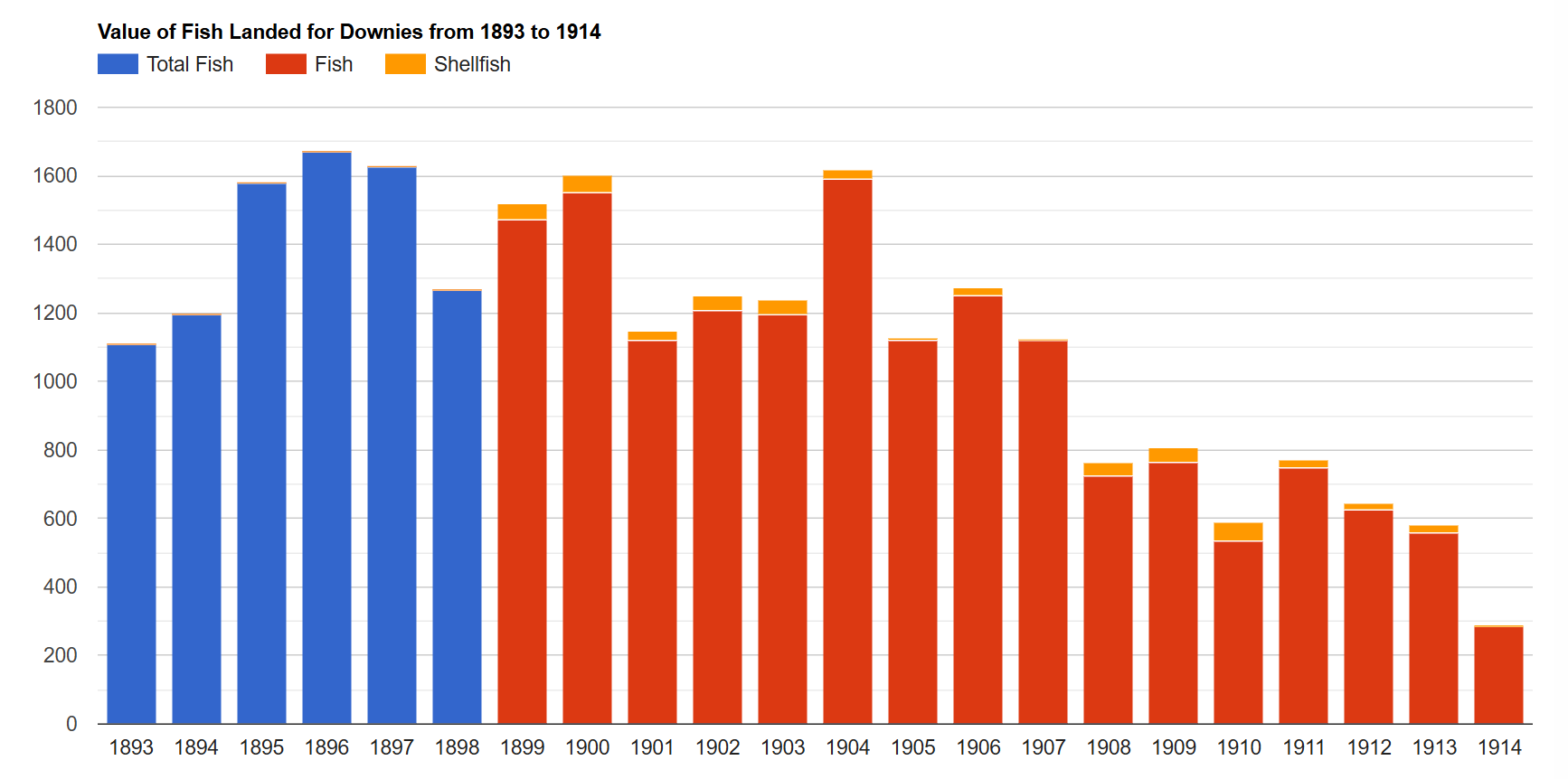
Value (£) of fish landed

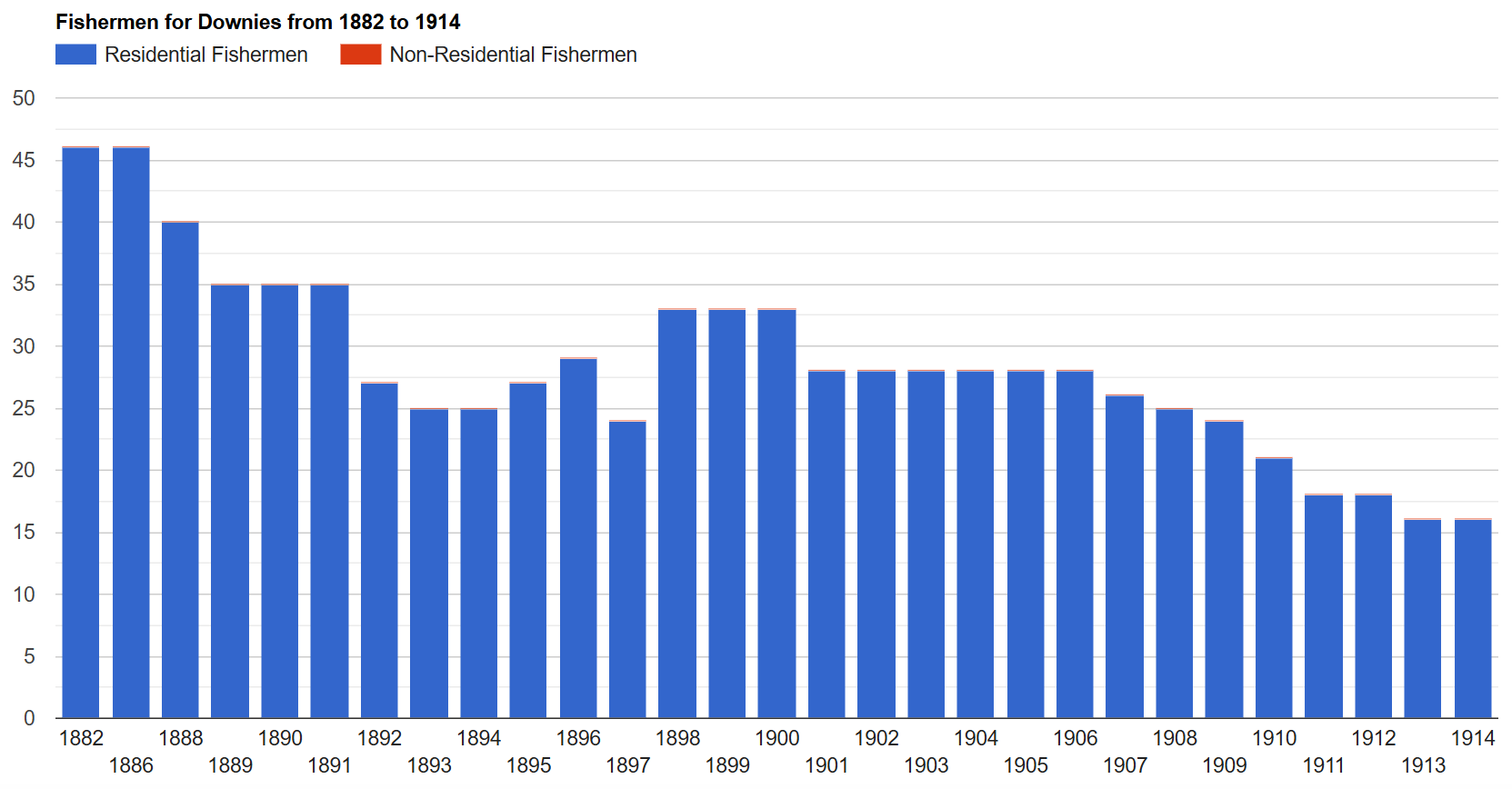
Fishermen

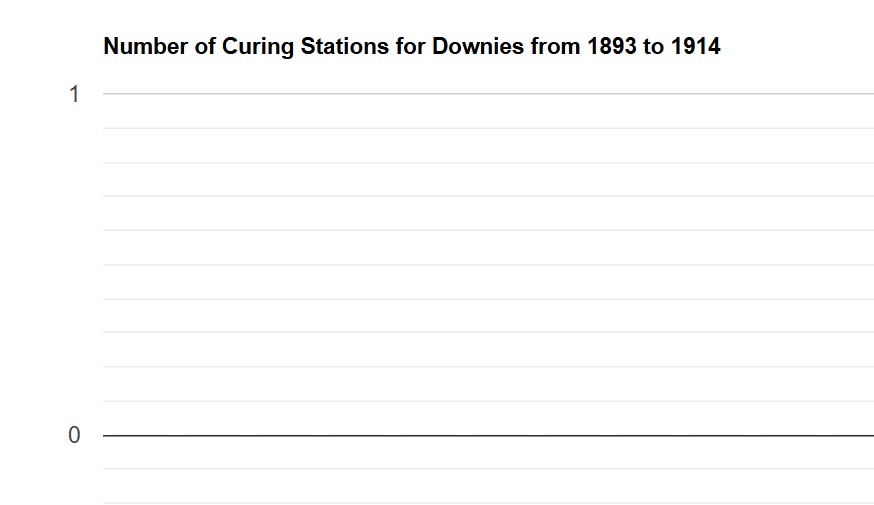
Placeholder - no curing stations

== See also ==
- Craigmaroinn
- Findon
- May Craig
- Portlethen
- Portlethen Village
