= Craigmaroinn =

Skerry in the North Sea

Coordinates: 57.05427°N 2.10748°W

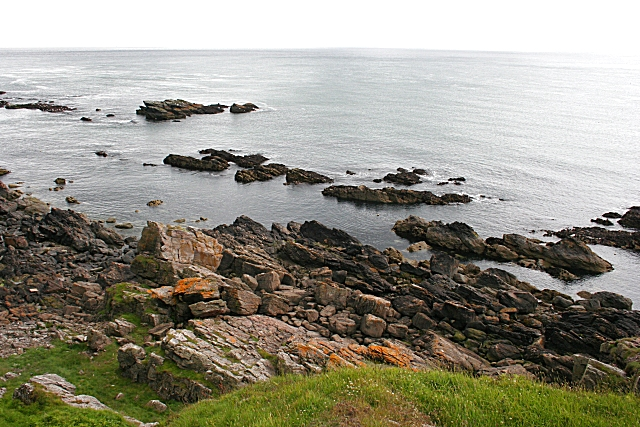

Craigmaroinn is a skerry in the North Sea near the Aberdeenshire coastline in Scotland. Craigmaroinn is situated midway between the coastal villages of Portlethen Village and Downies. Historical points of interest in the local area are Elsick House, Gillybrands and Muchalls Castle.

== History ==
The vicinity of Craigmaroinn was first recorded in medieval history in association with the Causey Mounth trackway. Craigmaroinn is situated several kilometres east of the ancient Causey Mounth, which road was built on high ground to make passable this only available route from coastal points south from Stonehaven to Aberdeen. This passage connected the River Dee crossing (where the present Bridge of Dee is situated) via Portlethen Moss, Muchalls Castle and Stonehaven to the south. The route was that taken by William Keith, 7th Earl Marischal and the Marquess of Montrose when they led a Covenanter army of 9000 men in the battle of the Civil War in 1639.

== See also ==
- May Craig
- Portlethen Village
