= Aquhorthies =

Aquhorthies may refer to:

- Easter Aquhorthies a stone circle near Inverurie, Aberdeenshire.
- Aquhorthies stone circle near Old Bourtreebush, Aberdeenshire.
- Aquhorthies College, a former Roman Catholic seminary from 1799 to 1829.
