= Auld Bourtreebush =

Stone circle in Aberdeenshire, Scotland

- Old Bourtree Bush, Old Bourtreebush
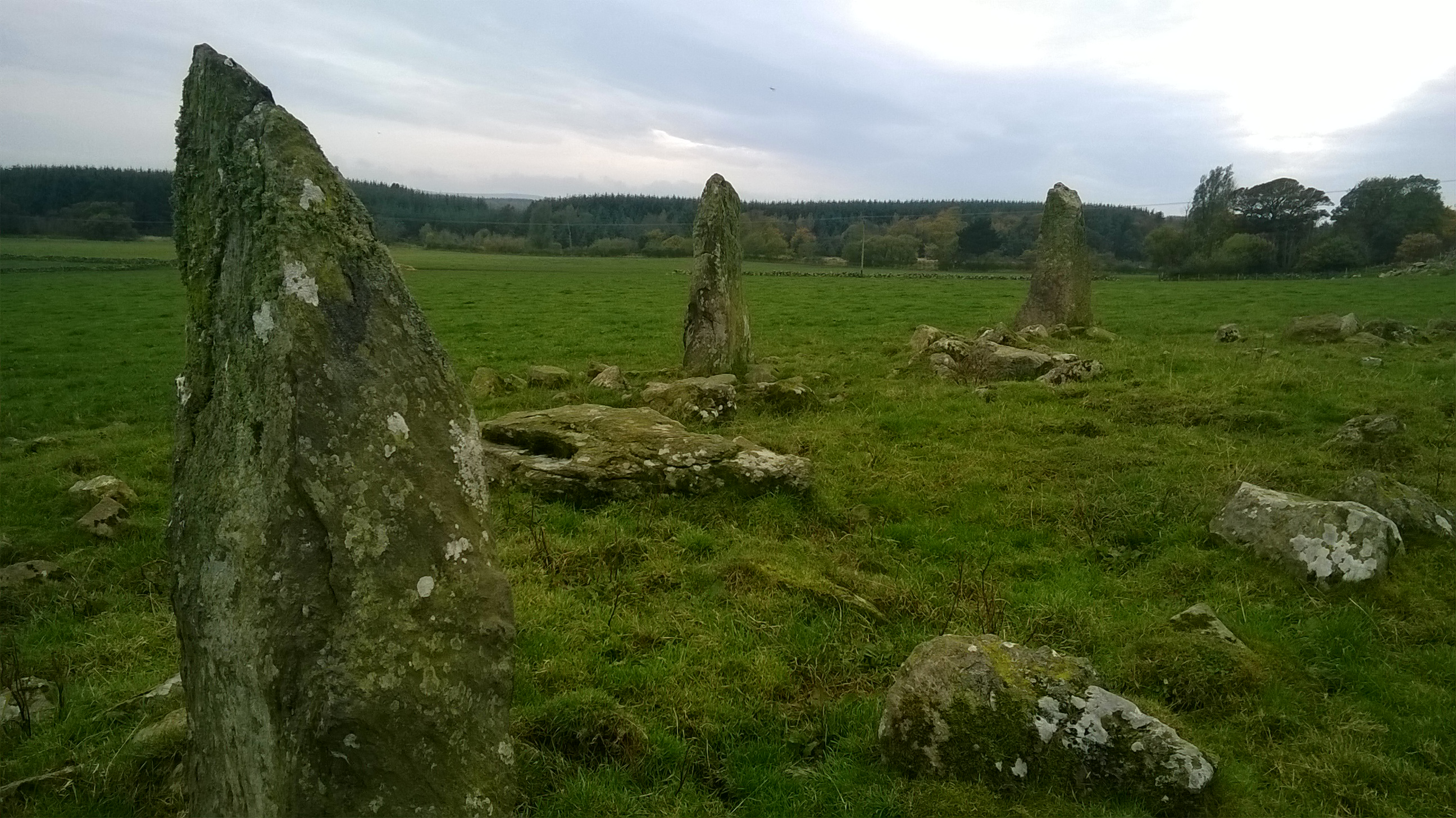
- Stones in 2020
- Interactive map of Auld Bourtreebush
- 57.0558°N 2.1606°W
- Type: stone circle
- Location: Scotland
- Region: Aberdeenshire

Site notes
- Diameter: 25 m (82 ft)

Scheduled monument
- Official name: Old Bourtreebush
- Type: Prehistoric ritual and funerary: stone circle or ring
- Designated: 31 July 1925
- Reference no.: SM980

Auld Bourtreebush is a large Neolithic stone circle near Portlethen in Aberdeenshire, Scotland. It is also known as Old Bourtree Bush or Old Bourtreebush. This megalithic construction is situated very close to the recumbent stone circle at Aquhorthies and near the Causey Mounth, an ancient trackway which connects the Scottish Lowlands to the Scottish Highlands. It is a scheduled monument.

== Stone circle ==
Auld Bourtreebush stone circle lies 200 metres to the west of Old Bourtreebush in Aberdeenshire and within sight of the Aquhorthies recumbent stone circle. It is a scheduled monument. It is 25 metres in diameter and is thought to have been composed of up to 15 orthostats, of which only four remain standing, although several others are lying fallen. Inside the circle was a ring cairn which has been destroyed over time. Whilst it was thought in the past to have been a recumbent stone circle, current archaeological opinion refutes this.

== Area history ==
Subsequent to the prehistory related to the construction of this stone circle, there is considerable medieval history associated with this monument's position along the ancient Causey Mounth trackway. Auld Bourtreebush is situated quite near to this old drovers' road, which was constructed on high ground to make passable this only available medieval route from coastal points south from Stonehaven to Aberdeen. This trackway specifically connected the River Dee crossing (where the present Bridge of Dee is situated) via Portlethen Moss, Muchalls Castle and Stonehaven to the south. The route was that taken by William Keith, 7th Earl Marischal and the Marquess of Montrose when they led a Covenanter army of 9000 men in the battle of the Civil War in 1639.

== See also ==
- Cammachmore
- Prehistoric Scotland
