= Loirston Loch =

Lake in Aberdeen, Scotland

- Loirston Loch from above, looking northeast

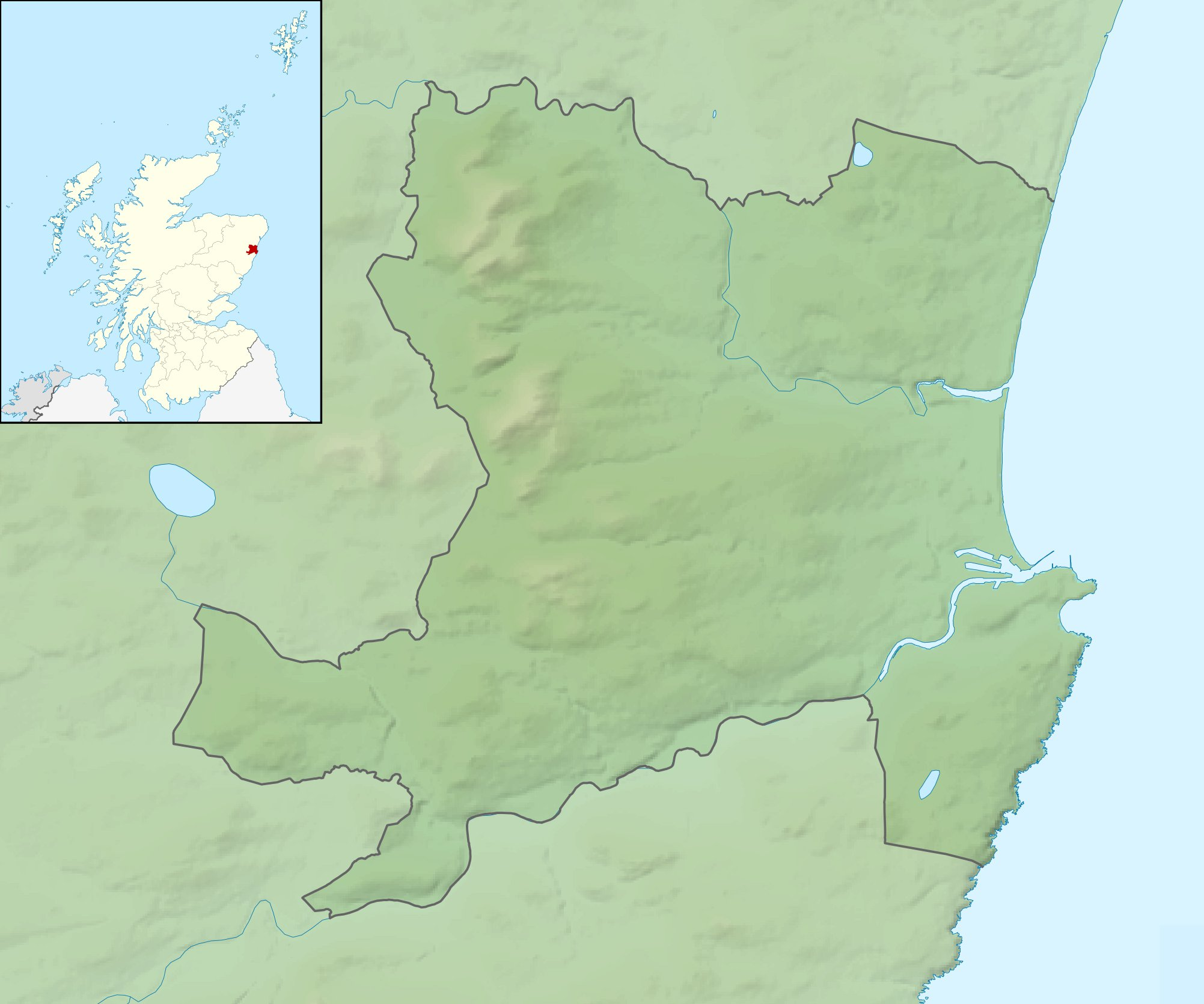
- Location within Aberdeen City council area
- Location: Aberdeen
- Coordinates: 57°06′04″N 2°06′08″W
- Basin countries: Scotland, United Kingdom
- Max. length: 618.6 m (2,030 ft)
- Max. width: 231.7 m (760 ft)
- Surface elevation: 80 m (260 ft)

Loirston Loch is a freshwater loch in the Cove Bay area of Aberdeen. It is bordered by Wellington Road on its eastern shore, and agricultural fields on its west.

The loch's name derives from the historic farming estate it was part of. Compared to other Scottish lochs, Loirston Loch is shallow, with an average depth of 3.5m and highly alkaline waters.

In 2015, Aberdeen City Council commissioned an archaeological survey of its southwestern shore, ahead of a planned development. It found large numbers of 19th century field drains but nothing of historic note, concluding that the loch once sat in poor, boggy ground.
