= Findon =

Findon may refer to:

Places

- Findon, Aberdeenshire or Finnan, a fishing village in Scotland
- Findon, South Australia, a suburb of Adelaide
- Findon, West Sussex, a village in England

People

- Andrew Findon, British flautist

== See also ==
- Findern, Derbyshire
- Finedon, Northamptonshire
