= Banchory-Devenick =

Hamlet in Aberdeenshire, Scotland

Coordinates: 57°06′46″N 2°9′23″W

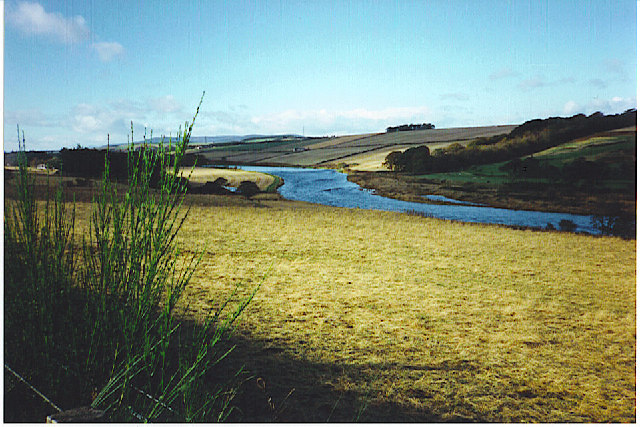

Banchory-Devenick (Scottish Gaelic: Beannchar Dòmhnaig) is a hamlet approximately two kilometres south of the city of Aberdeen, Scotland in the Lower Deeside area of Aberdeenshire. The hamlet should not be confused with the historic civil parish of the same name which spanned the River Dee until 1891, its northern part lying in Aberdeenshire and its southern part in Kincardineshire. In that year the northern part became part of the neighbouring parish of Peterculter, the southern part (including the hamlet itself) remaining as the parish of Banchory-Devenick. The hamlet of Banchory-Devenick is on the B9077 road, and the ancient Causey Mounth passes directly through it. An historic graveyard dating to 1157 AD is present within Banchory-Devenick. Other historic features in the vicinity include Saint Ternan's Church, Muchalls Castle and the former Lairhillock Inn.

== History ==
Banchory-Devenick is located along the Causey Mounth trackway, which road was constructed on high ground to make passable this only available medieval route from coastal points south from Stonehaven to Aberdeen. This ancient passage specifically connected the River Dee crossing (where the present Bridge of Dee is situated) via Portlethen Moss, Muchalls Castle and Stonehaven to the south. The route was that taken by William Keith, 7th Earl Marischal and the Duke of Montrose when they led a Covenanter army of 9000 men in the first battle of the English Civil War in 1639.

== Churches ==
The parish of Banchory Devenick was created in 1163. There have been numerous Churches upon this site. For many years it was the only church between St Machars Cathedral in Old Aberdeen and Fetteresso in Stonehaven. The existing Banchory-Devenick Parish Church was built in 1822. That was built to replace a church from the 17th century, possibly 1642. This in turn had replaced a much earlier Christian building. It is also claimed that St Devenick, an early Christian missionary, was buried on this site or close by in 887.

Maryculter Parish Church was linked to the Banchory-Devenick congregation in 1972. In 2000, the congregation was united with Maryculter-Cookney congregation (a previous merger in 1982 of those two congregations). The building was closed in 2014 when the congregation become Maryculter Trinity.

After the Disruption in 1843, members of the Banchory-Devenick Parish Church left to form Banchory-Devenick Free Church of Scotland. That year, a new place of worship was established, the Free Church Of St Devenick. It was built further south, in more rural farmland. In 1929, along with many former Free Churches, it merged into the original Church of Scotland again and became known as St Devenicks-On-The-Hill Parish Kirk. In 1936 it united with the original Banchory-Devenick Parish Church from which it had split about 90 years prior. The building was converted into flats in 1989.

== See also ==
- List of listed buildings in Banchory-Devenick
- Burn of Elsick
- Hare Moss
- Portlethen Moss
- Alexander Thomson of Banchory FRSE (1798–1868) landowner, author, traveller, philanthropist
