= Portlethen Village =

Settlement in Aberdeenshire, Scotland

Coordinates: 57.05688°N 2.11324°W

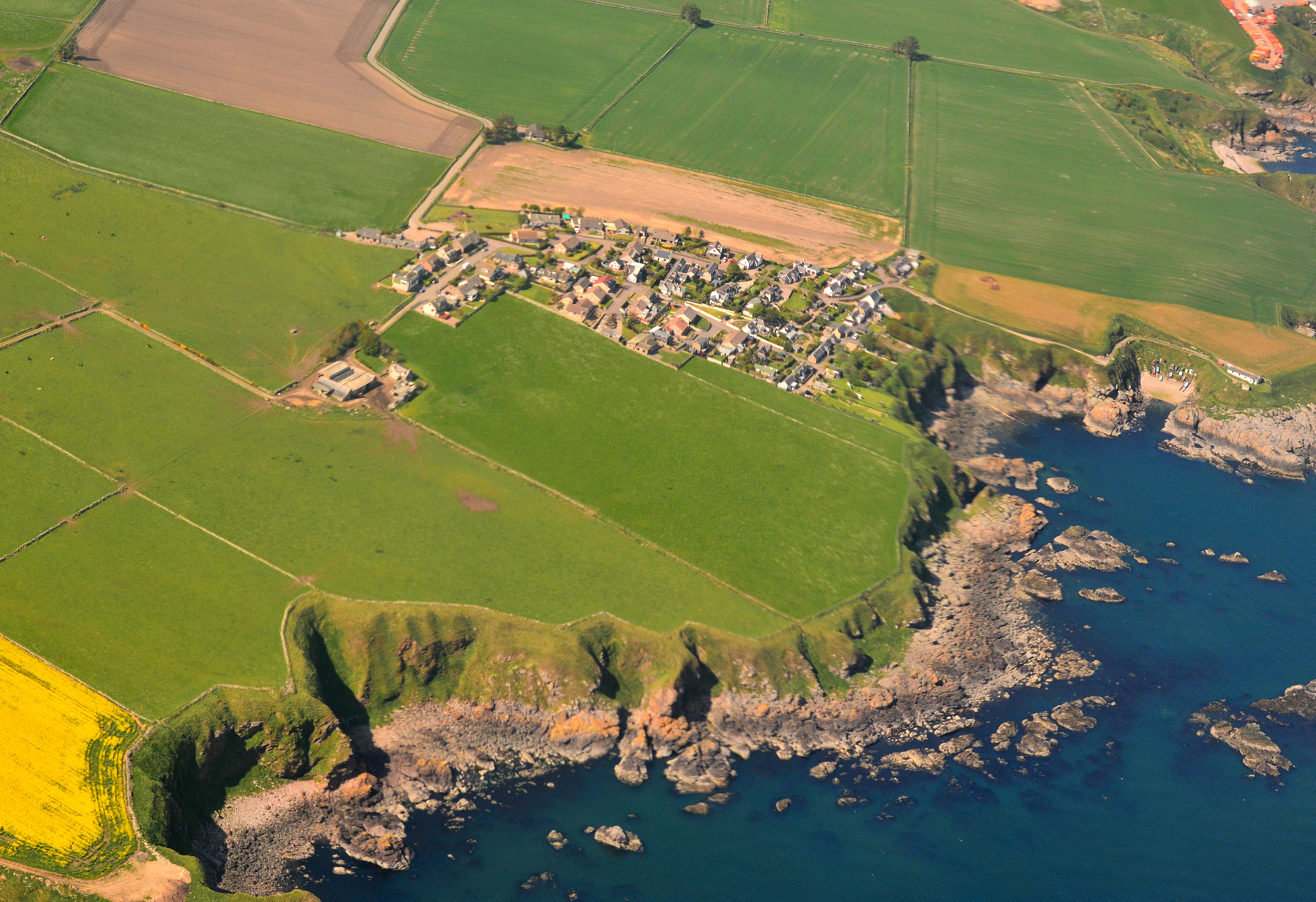
Aerial view of the village

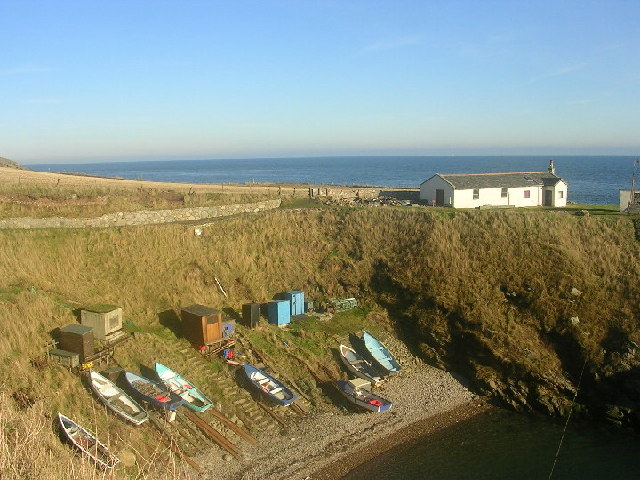
Portlethen harbour

Portlethen Village is a settlement located to the east of Portlethen along the North Sea coast in Aberdeenshire, Scotland. The village is also known as Old Portlethen. The skerry of Craigmaroinn is situated just off the coastline near Portlethen Village.

== History ==
Portlethen Village is situated slightly to the east of the ancient Causey Mounth trackway, which road was constructed to make passable this only available medieval route from coastal points south from Stonehaven north to Aberdeen. This ancient trackway specifically connected the River Dee crossing (where the present Bridge of Dee is situated) via Portlethen Moss, Muchalls Castle and Stonehaven to the south. The route was that taken by William Keith, 7th Earl Marischal and the Marquess of Montrose when they led a Covenanter army of 9000 men in the battle of the Civil War in 1639.

For centuries prior to the collapse of local marine fisheries in the 1900s, Portlethen Village derived its livelihood from use of small oceangoing wooden boats in pursuit of North Sea fish. It also has a small public house called The Neuk.

== Castle ==
It has been noted that Portlethen Village once had a castle nearby similar to the one at Muchalls. Legend has it that Portlethen castle had a secret cave leading to the sea like the one at Muchalls Castle. No one is sure why this 17th-century building no longer exists. It stood at the site of the Mains of Portlethen farm. Remains of the castle's walls are present in the farmhouse. The castle may have been L-Plan like most of the castles in the area, such as Muchalls Castle. The castle was built by Robert Buchan, who owned the estate of Portlethen in the 17th century.

== See also ==
- Findon, Aberdeenshire
- Portlethen
- Portlethen Moss
