= May Craig (island) =

Island of Aberdeenshire, Scotland

Coordinates: 57°1′29.56″N 2°8′50.68″W

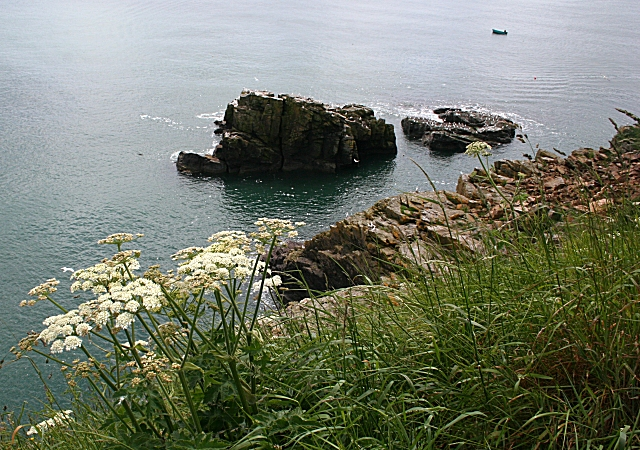
May Craig south of Newtonhill

May Craig is a rocky island situated along the North Sea coast of Aberdeenshire, Scotland. May Craig lies about one half mile (0.8 km) south of Newtonhill and a mile (1.6 km) northeast of the village of Muchalls. A small islet of the same name lies three miles (five km) to the north-northeast.

== Area history ==
The area to the west of May Craig was first inhabited by Pictish peoples who left prehistoric megalithic monuments along a trackway known as the Causey Mounth, a name coined in medieval times. Examples of these megaliths are Old Bourtreebush stone circle and Aquhorthies stone circle. Historic structures in the general area include Elsick House, Gillybrands and Muchalls Castle.

== See also ==
- Findon
- Portlethen
