= St Mary's Church, Cove Bay =

Church in Aberdeen, Scotland

Coordinates: 57°6′2″N 2°4′45″W

St Mary the Virgin (Cove Bay) was an Episcopal Church in Cove Bay, Aberdeen, Scotland. It was part of the Diocese of Aberdeen and Orkney in the Scottish Episcopal Church until its closure in April 2020.

== History of the Church ==
When the Church was opened as an Episcopalian mission hall by Dr Alexander Forbes, Bishop of Brechin, in 1864, the fishing village of Cove Bay (which is now a suburb of Aberdeen) was largely made up of imported English fishermen and their families for whom the Episcopal (Anglican) faith was a central feature of life. The building originally served a dual purpose as a church and a boys' school, and has been an important part of the village's life for over a century.

From the very beginning there was a strong connection to St Peter's Episcopal Church in Torry. Often when there was no priest at St Mary's, members would walk along the coastal path to St Peter's for baptisms, confirmations, weddings or funerals.

The church building is a granite building with a slate roof and a bell. The interior pitched roof, is open, i.e., the wooden rafters and wooden roof boards are visible. It can seat approximately 100 persons. The Church was built with a rose window at the east end where the boys’ school met, and a raised, three-sided apse at the west end, where the original altar was situated.

In the 1890s a new school was built in Cove, and the building became solely a church.

The apse walls are thought to have been originally painted in 1870. The paintings were subsequently covered up, about 1924, when it was thought they were too "Catholic". In 1929 six stained glass windows were put into the building.

At some point in its history, the interior was re-oriented to face east, reflecting the traditional layout of an Episcopal church. The rear of the church was partitioned off and became a storage area for many years.

About 1990, the original vestry, situated off the south side, was converted to a kitchen, disabled toilet and a Church entrance. Disabled access was made via a ramp leading to the new side door. At that time an emergency door was established through the north wall.

By the late 1990s, through cultural changes and shifts in population, the congregation had dwindled to a handful of faithful members, and St Mary's building was in a sad state of disrepair.

The church building is now listed as category B by Historic Environment Scotland.

== Cove Congregational Church ==
In October 2003, it was agreed that Cove Congregational Church should share the building. Since then the physical church has seen on-going repairs, detailed below, and the spiritual Church has found new life. The two congregations, Episcopal and Congregational, have very different styles of worship but share many other aspects of the church's life—fellowship meetings, fund-raisers, decisions about the property.

Cove Congregational Church began as a church plant in 1995. Cove Congregational Church is affiliated to the Congregational Federation; the Scottish Area has 29 member churches that are independent but share fellowship together, working together for mutual support.

== Historic paintings ==
As part of the building restoration works, panelling at the west end of the building was removed, revealing five paintings of various sizes. These paintings have been described as "decorative panels of real historical interest". There is also a painting of Madonna. Advice has been taken from members of Episcopal Diocese, Aberdeen City Council, and The Conservation Studio, Edinburgh. All have indicated that the paintings are unusual, worth restoring and preserving for the Community.

Christmas Eve 2004 saw the first public showing of the first three restored paintings. Christmas 2005 saw the return of all the paintings. A special service was held in September 2005 to commemorate the unveiling of the restored artwork.

== Service & Activity times ==
Sunday 9:30am (Episcopal)

Sunday 11:00am (Congregational) Thursday 7pm Bible Study Friday 3-5pm Craft & Friendship Club (Winter) Friday 6pm-8pm Boy's Brigade in Loirston Annexe (term time) Last Saturday of the Month 10am-12noon Community Coffee Morning
