= Aquhorthies stone circle =

Architectural structure in Aberdeenshire, Scotland

Aquhorthies
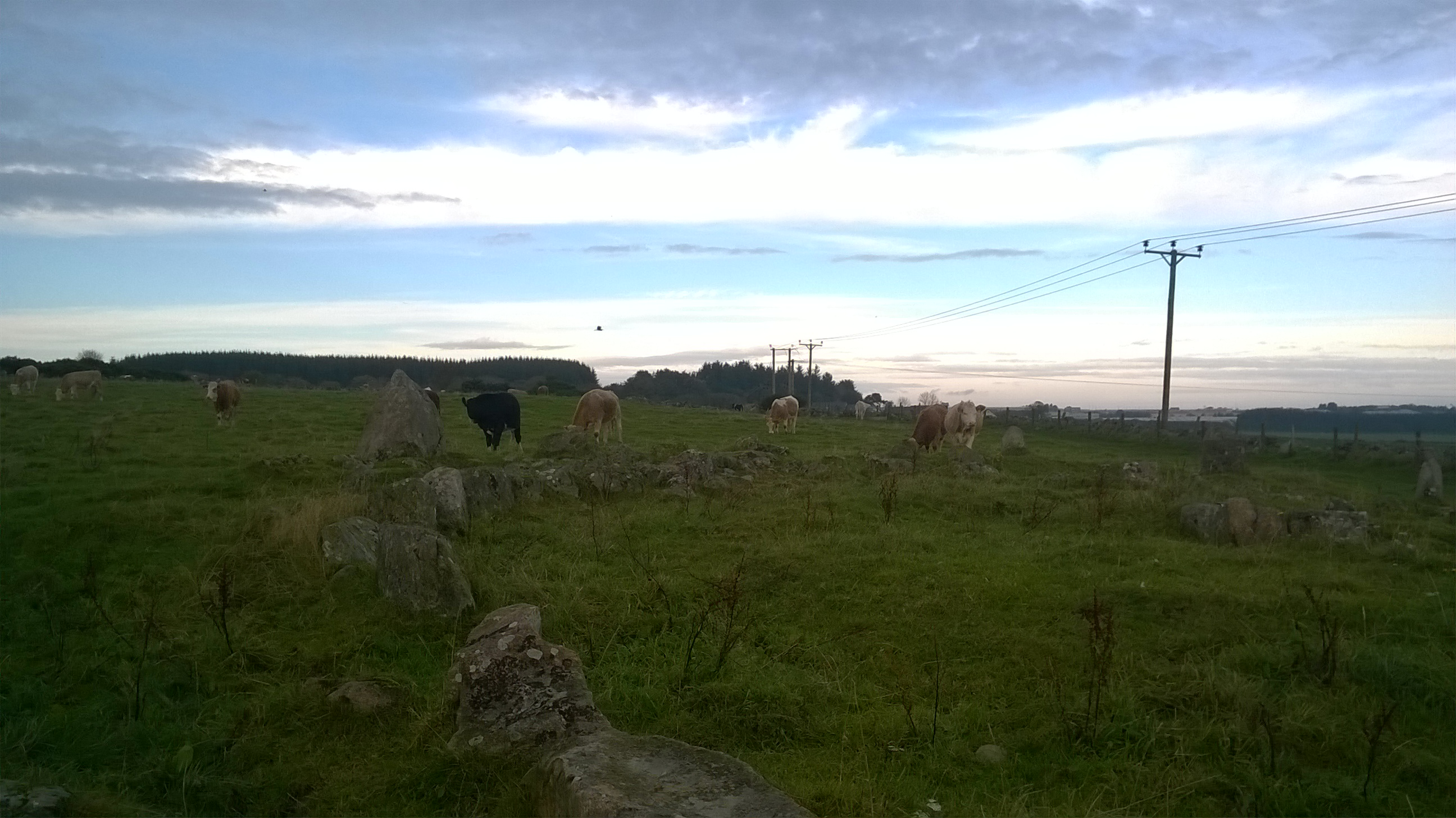
- The circle in 2020
- Interactive map of Aquhorthies
- 57.05801°N 2.16351°W
- Type: Recumbent stone circle
- Location: West of Portlethen
- Region: Aberdeenshire
- OS grid reference: NO901963

Site notes
- Public access: Yes

Scheduled monument
- Official name: Aquhorthies
- Type: Prehistoric ritual and funerary: enclosure (ritual or funerary rather than defensive or domestic); ring cairn; stone circle or ring
- Designated: 31 July 1925
- Reference no.: SM971

Aquhorthies is a Neolithic stone circle near Portlethen in Aberdeenshire, Scotland. The site is composed of a ring cairn and a recumbent stone circle which unusually has two rings. It stands one field away from Auld Bourtreebush stone circle, near to the Causey Mounth. It is a scheduled monument.

== Recumbent stone circles ==
A recumbent stone circle is a type of stone circle constructed in the early Bronze Age. The identifying feature is that the largest stone (the recumbent) is always laid horizontally, with its long axis generally aligned with the perimeter of the ring between the south and southwest. A flanker stone stands each side of the recumbent and these are typically the tallest stones in the circle, with the smallest being situated on the northeastern aspect. The rest of the circle is usually composed of between six and ten orthostats graded by size. The builders tended to select a site which was on a level spur of a hill with excellent views to other landmarks. Over seventy of these circles are found in lowland Aberdeenshire in northeast Scotland – the most similar monuments are the axial stone circles of southwest Ireland. Recumbent stone circles generally enclosed a low ring cairn, though over the millennia these have often disappeared. They may have been a development from the Clava cairns found nearby in Inverness-shire and axial stone circles may have followed the design. Whilst cremated remains have been found at some sites, the precise function of these circles is not known.

== Description ==
The Aquhorthies stone circle is thought to have consisted of two stone circles and a ring cairn, set on a platform. It currently has fourteen remaining orthostats, two being stumps, and originally had at least 18. The cairn has been damaged with only the kerb still intact. The recumbent stone is 2.75 m wide and 1.4 m tall. It is missing one of its flankers. Atypically, there is a forecourt in front of the recumbent. It was made a scheduled monument in 1925.

== Visits and excavations ==
The antiquarian James Garden visited in 1692 on the insistence of John Aubrey but his report confuses the site with the Auld Bourtreebush stone circle in the next field. Aquhorthies was drawn in the 1820s by James Skene and James Logan. It was excavated in 1858 by James Dyce Nicol, Charles Dalrymple, James Nicolson, Captain James Burnett, the Reverend Harry Stuart and Alexander Thomson. The cairn had already been plundered and they discovered some burnt bone fragments and pottery sherds. In the late nineteenth century the circle was visited by among others William Collings Lukis, Christian Maclagan, Robert Angus Smith, William Tomkin and Frederick Coles. Alexander Keiller noted in 1934 that there was an atypical number of stones and that their heights alternated. Alexander Thom surveyed the site in 1955 and Clive Ruggles checked for archaeoastrological alignments in 1981. A geological survey was carried out in 2006.
