= Alexander Robertson (veterinary surgeon) =

Scottish veterinarian and administrator

Sir Alexander Robertson CBE FRSE FRCVS (3 February 1908 – 5 September 1990) was a Scottish veterinarian and administrator.

== Life ==
Robertson was born on 3 February 1908 in Aberdeen, the youngest and only surviving child of Barbara Minty Strath and Alexander Robertson, a chauffeur and gardener. He was educated at Mackie Academy in Stonehaven.

He studied veterinary science at the University of Aberdeen, graduating with an MA in 1929 and a BSc in 1930. In 1937, he joined the staff of the Dick Vet College in Edinburgh, as a lecturer in animal physiology, obtaining a doctorate (PhD) from the University of Edinburgh in 1940. From that year he was Professor of Animal Husbandry at the Dick Vet.

In 1946, he was elected a Fellow of the Royal Society of Edinburgh. His proposers were Alan William Greenwood, James Ebenezer Wilson, John Russell Greig and Donald Capell Matheson. He served as Vice President of the Society from 1969 to 1972.

In 1951, he became Professor of Animal Health at the University of Edinburgh.

He became a Commander of the Order of the British Empire (CBE) in 1963 and was knighted in 1970. In 1971 he received an honorary doctorate (LLD) from the University of Aberdeen.

He died in Edinburgh on 5 September 1990.

== Recognition ==
A plaque to his memory was erected on Marischal College soon after his death.

== Family ==
In 1936 he married Janet McKinlay (d.1988) and together they had two daughters.

== Publications ==
- Handbook of Tropical Veterinary Laboratory Diagnosis (1982)
