= Portlethen Academy =

Coordinates: 57°3′28″N 2°7′59″W

Portlethen Academy & Community Facilities

Location
- Bruntland Road, Portlethen; Aberdeenshire, AB12 4QL

Information
- Type: Secondary School
- Motto: Learn and Improve. Get Involved. Think of The Consequences. Respect All.
- Opened: 20 April 1987 (original building); 22 August 2006 (current building)
- Local authority: Aberdeenshire Council
- Head Teacher: Barry Drennan
- Staff: N/A
- Years: S1-S6
- Age: 11 to 18
- Enrolment: 850
- Colours: Red, black, blue
- CSN Primary Schools: Portlethen Primary, Fishermoss Primary, Newtonhill Primary, Banchory-Devenick Primary, Hillside Primary, Cove Primary
- Website: http://www.portlethenacademy.aberdeenshire.sch.uk

Portlethen Academy is a six-year comprehensive secondary school in Portlethen, Aberdeenshire, Scotland.

== History ==
The Old Building as seen from the west on Bruntland Road

With the expansion of the communities of Portlethen and Newtonhill in the 1980s, the Education Committee of Grampian Regional Council decided to build a new six-year Academy in Portlethen. Until then, pupils from the area were bused to Mackie Academy, in near-by Stonehaven. Portlethen Academy opened on 20 April 1987 as a new school for the communities of Portlethen, Newtonhill, Muchalls and Banchory-Devenick. Originally owned by Grampian Regional Council, the school passed to Aberdeenshire Council, when it formed in 1996.

The school opened with 180 pupils in Years 1 and 2 and a capacity of around 650. It has expanded in numbers each session since April 1987, reaching over 800 pupils. As the roll rose, the school became too small to accommodate all the pupils and staff. Seven temporary classrooms were added to the school prior to closure. The current Headteacher is Barry Drennan.

Aberdeenshire Council commissioned a new school under the PPP Scheme.

== Current building ==
As early as the turn of the millennium, plans existed for a new school, to be built and managed by Robertson FM, as part of the Government's PPP scheme. It was built on the playing fields adjacent to the existing Academy. Construction started in June 2004, and was completed by the end of July 2006. Originally set to open in June 2006, for the start of the new timetable, a burst pipe delayed the school's opening until August. The new building opened on 22 August 2006 with a roll of 867. The old school has been knocked down, and the main car park which forms part of the area along with the all-weather pitch made up stage 2 of the relocation programme.
