= Mackie Academy =

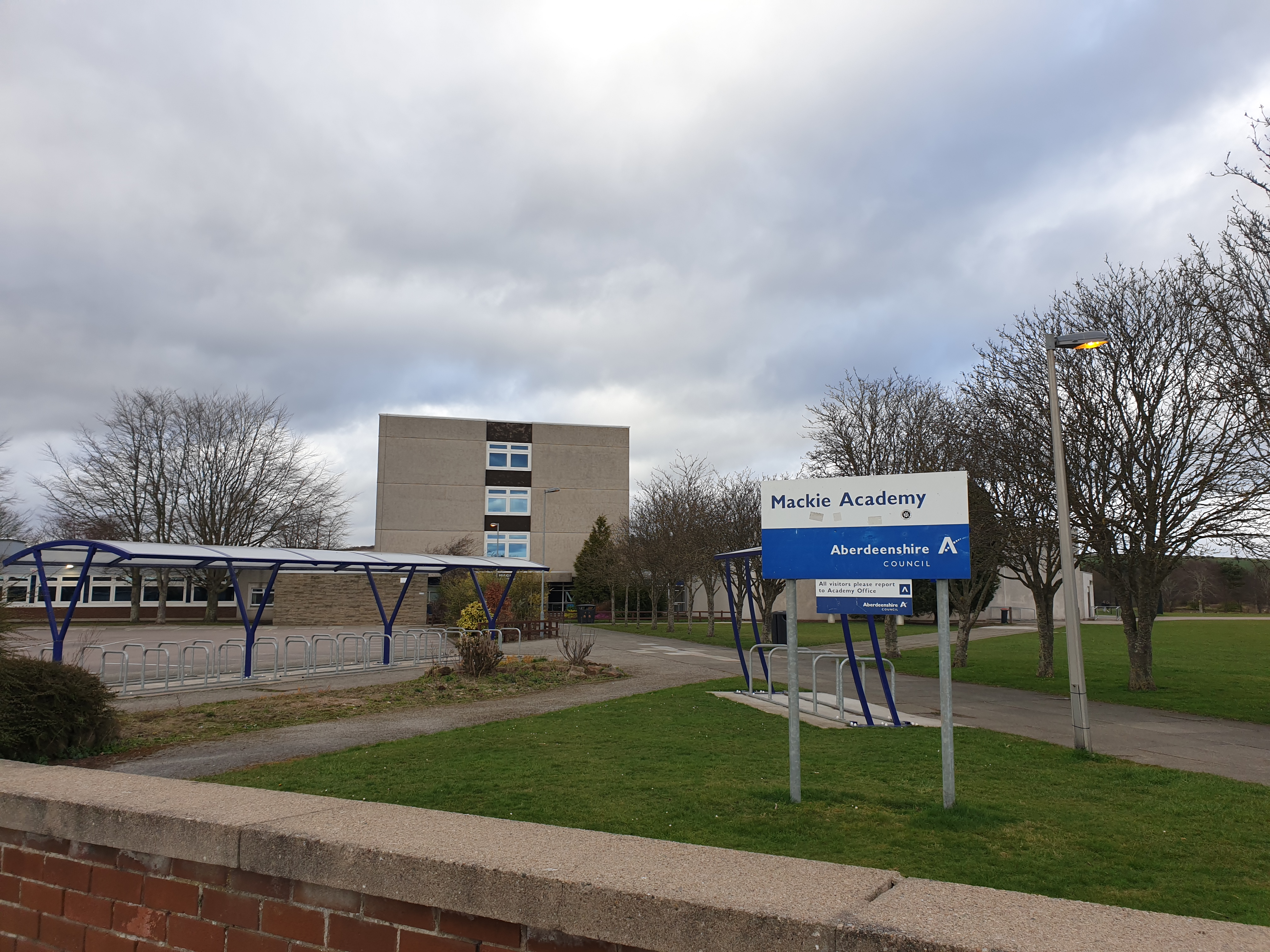

Location
- Slug Road; Stonehaven, Aberdeenshire, AB39 3DF; Scotland; 56.9717°N 2.2227°W

Information
- Type: Secondary school
- Motto: Latin: Tendit in Ardua Virtus
- Religious affiliation: Non-Denominational
- Founded: 1893
- Local authority: Aberdeenshire Council
- Rector: Louise Moir
- Staff: 70–90
- Age: 11 to 18
- Enrolment: 1,112 (2023)
- Language: English. With the addition of French and Spanish offered as classes.
- Hours in school day: 6hours, 35 minutes
- Houses: Cowie, Dunnottar, Fetteresso, Swanley, Ury
- Colours: Red, blue and yellow
- Slogan: There is virtue in hard work
- Feeder schools: Arduthie, Bervie, Catterline, Dunnottar, Glenbervie, Gourdon, Johnshaven, Kinneff, Lairhillock, Mill O'Forest
- Website: Mackie Academy

Mackie Academy is a secondary school in Stonehaven, Aberdeenshire. As of the 2023/2024 school year, Mackie Academy had roughly 1,112 pupils and 80 teaching staff. The feeder primary schools are Arduthie, Bervie, Catterline, Dunnottar, Glenbervie, Gourdon, Johnshaven, Kinneff, Lairhillock, and Mill O'Forest.

== History ==
The school was founded in 1893 thanks to the generosity of a local merchant, William Mackie, who bequeathed money in his will to establish a school in Stonehaven. The original site was on Arduthie Road, where Arduthie Primary school is now situated. The original building on this site was destroyed in a fire in the 1920s and had to be rebuilt.

The new building on Slug Road was officially opened on 20 March 1970 by former pupil Alexander Robertson, though teaching was suspended at the time due to strikes. This land had previously been used as the Academy playing fields and the grounds around the present building are still used for this purpose. Between mid-2009 and late 2010 extensive work was carried out to the toilet facilities introducing 13 disabled toilets and 15 toilets. The school served a large geographical area surrounding Stonehaven until the opening of Portlethen Academy, which reduced the catchment area of the school drastically.

After 2009, a large fence was erected around the school grounds.

In January 2021, the decision was taken to close the swimming pool and use the space for other sports facilities.

== Pupil activities ==
The school's pupils are divided into five different houses, which are derived from the surrounding geography of Stonehaven and historical local figures. These houses are Cowie, Dunnottar, Fetteresso, Swanley and Ury. Until 2014, a 6th house, Rickarton, was included in the school. However, this house was then disintegrated due to drops in pupil population and the retiring of Rickarton's guidance teacher.
