= List of listed buildings in Banchory-Devenick =

This is a list of listed buildings in the parish of Banchory-Devenick in Aberdeenshire, Scotland.

== List ==
Name	Location	Date Listed	Grid Ref. (Note: Sometimes known as OSGB36, the grid reference (where provided) is based on the British national grid reference system used by the Ordnance Survey. • "Guide to National Grid". Ordnance Survey. • "Get-a-map". Ordnance Survey.)	Geo-coordinates	Notes	LB Number (Note: Historic Environment Scotland assign a unique alphanumeric identifier to each designated site in Scotland, for listed buildings this always begins with "LB", for example "LB12345".)	Image
Morison's Bridge Over River Dee				57°06′52″N 2°10′14″W	Category B	2866	Upload Photo
"Whin Cottage"				57°06′39″N 2°09′20″W	Category C(S)	2865	Upload Photo
Stewart Vault, St Devenicks Kirkyard				57°06′22″N 2°08′45″W	Category C(S)	2868	Upload Photo
Banchory House				57°06′47″N 2°08′27″W	Category B	2870	Upload Photo
Boswell's Monument, Auchlee Hill				57°03′57″N 2°11′02″W	Category C(S)	2873	Upload Photo
Portlethan Parish Kirk				57°03′38″N 2°07′38″W	Category C(S)	2874	Upload Photo
Watch-House, Parish Kirkyard				57°06′46″N 2°09′20″W	Category B	2862	Upload Photo
Banchory House - Drumduan Lodge				57°06′54″N 2°08′43″W	Category C(S)	2871	Upload Photo
"Elm Cottage" Hilldowntree				57°07′03″N 2°07′30″W	Category B	146	Upload Photo
Banchory-Devenick Parish Kirk				57°06′47″N 2°09′20″W	Category B	2861	Upload Photo
Old Schoolhouse				57°06′45″N 2°09′20″W	Category C(S)	2864	Upload Photo
St Devenicks Manse				57°06′28″N 2°08′43″W	Category C(S)	2869	Upload Photo
Findon Mill				57°03′51″N 2°07′23″W	Category C(S)	2875	Upload Photo
Old Manse				57°06′44″N 2°09′31″W	Category B	2863	Upload Photo
Hillside House				57°04′14″N 2°07′51″W	Category B	2872	Upload Photo
St Devenicks-On-The-Hill Parish Kirk				57°06′22″N 2°08′50″W	Category B	2867	Upload Photo

== Key ==
The scheme for classifying buildings in Scotland is:

- Category A: "buildings of national or international importance, either architectural or historic; or fine, little-altered examples of some particular period, style or building type."
- Category B: "buildings of regional or more than local importance; or major examples of some particular period, style or building type, which may have been altered."
- Category C: "buildings of local importance; lesser examples of any period, style, or building type, as originally constructed or moderately altered; and simple traditional buildings which group well with other listed buildings."

In March 2016 there were 47,288 listed buildings in Scotland. Of these, 8% were Category A, and 50% were Category B, with the remaining 42% being Category C.

== See also ==
- List of listed buildings in Aberdeenshire
