= Findon, Aberdeenshire =

Fishing village eight miles south of Aberdeen, Scotland

Coordinates: 57°4′8″N 2°6′8″W

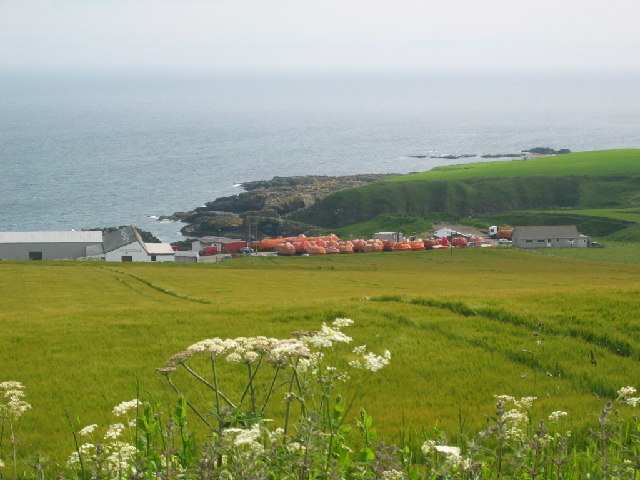
Survival craft for the offshore industry are inspected at Findon

Findon or Finnan (Scots: Finnan, Scottish Gaelic: Fionndan, meaning the white fort) is a fishing village eight miles south of Aberdeen, famous for originating the smoked haddock known as Finnan haddie. The Findon moor has a number of paths through it, many of which run along the cliffs. Deer can often be seen there. Nearby features include the Portlethen Moss Nature Reserve.

Historical buildings in the area include Elsick House, Gillybrands and Muchalls Castle.

== Geography ==
Findon is a coastal village along the North Sea in the area historically known as Kincardineshire. Somewhat to the south of Findon is the small offshore island of May Craig.

== History ==
The local area was first recorded in medieval history in association with the Causey Mounth. Findon is situated somewhat east of the ancient Causey Mounth trackway, which road was constructed on high ground to make passable this only available medieval route from coastal points south from Stonehaven to Aberdeen. This ancient passage specifically connected the River Dee crossing (where the present Bridge of Dee is situated) via Portlethen Moss, Muchalls Castle and Stonehaven to the south. The route was that taken by William Keith, 7th Earl Marischal and the Marquess of Montrose when they led a Covenanter army of 9,000 men in the battle of the Civil War in 1639.

== See also ==
- Burn of Elsick
- Burn of Pheppie
- Downies
- Portlethen Village
