= Portlethen =

Coordinates: 57.061°N 2.130°W

Portlethen: Scottish Gaelic: Port Leathain
- Location within Aberdeenshire
- Population: 8,940 (2020)
- OS grid reference: NO9178396318
- Council area: Aberdeenshire
- Lieutenancy area: Kincardineshire
- Country: Scotland
- Sovereign state: United Kingdom
- Post town: ABERDEEN
- Postcode district: AB12
- Dialling code: 01224
- Police: Scotland
- Fire: Scottish
- Ambulance: Scottish
- UK Parliament: West Aberdeenshire & Kincardine
- Scottish Parliament: Aberdeen South and North Kincardine

Portlethen (/pɔːrtˈlɛθən/; Scottish Gaelic: Port Leathain) is a town located approximately 7 miles south of Aberdeen, Scotland, along the A92. The population according to the 2022 census was 8,969, making it the seventh most populous settlement within Aberdeenshire.

To the east of Portlethen lie three fishing villages: Findon, Downies and Portlethen Village (now often referred to as Old Portlethen).

== Geography ==
Portlethen is situated to the west of the Dundee–Aberdeen line railway tracks and on both sides of the A92 road, a short distance inland from the North Sea coast. It is in the historic county of Kincardineshire.

== History ==
Portlethen is located half a mile inland from the small fishing village now known as Old Portlethen.

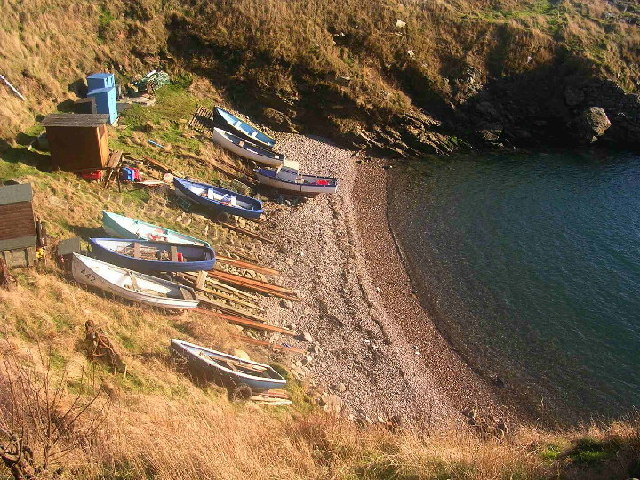
An inlet on the North Sea at Portlethen, historically used as Portlethen Harbour.

Portlethen lies about two kilometres east of the ancient Causey Mounth road which was the only available medieval route from coastal points south to Aberdeen. This ancient passage connected the Bridge of Dee with Muchalls Castle and Stonehaven to the south.

Battle of Portlethen. In November 1780 during the wars with France the British army used fencible regiments for home defence. The Sutherland Fencibles armed with muskets engaged in action with the crew of armed with muskets and Swivel guns of a French privateer. The engagement was reported in the newspapers of the period.

On 2 September 1799 George Auldjo of Portlethen offered for safe at the New Inn, Aberdeen 'LOT 1. Is to consist of the Lands and Barony of PORTLETHEN, Mill, Mill-lands, Multures and sequels, Sea-port, Haven and Harbour of Portlethen, with the tolls, duties, customs, and anchorages thereof, and White-fishing in the sea adjacent to said lands.'

=== Nature reserve ===
Much of modern-day Portlethen has been built over the Portlethen Moss Nature Reserve, formerly home to the great crested newt. The remainder of Portlethen Moss is approximately one quarter of the size it was twenty years ago. Portlethen Moss Conservation Group was created to preserve the area.

== Amenities ==
=== Retail ===
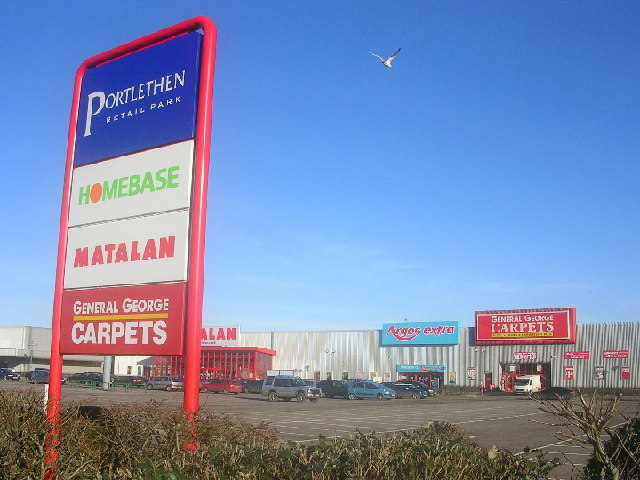
Portlethen Retail Park

Portlethen has four main shopping areas: Portlethen Retail Park, The Green, Muirend Court and Rowanbank Court.

=== Churches ===
Portlethen has a number of Christian congregations. These include Portlethen Parish Church - part of the Church of Scotland. It has now united with Newtonhill Parish Church to become Kincardine Coastal Parish Church. There is also Portlethen Christian Fellowship - an independent Christian Church. And, it also has a congregation of the Redeemed Christian Church of God.

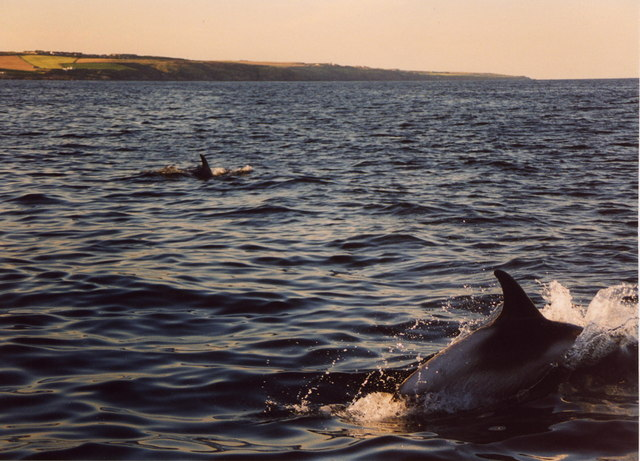
White-beaked dolphins south east of Old Portlethen. Whale and dolphin watching is a popular attraction in summer.

=== Sport ===
Portlethen has two all-weather concrete tennis courts, a bowling green with public and private sessions, a swimming pool and a private members' golf club. It is also home to the Lethen Archers club.

==== Swimming pool ====
The pool is 25 metres long and was opened on 29 June 1991 by Olympic swimmer Ian Black. Portlethen swimming pool is the regular meeting place of the Reef Rats underwater hockey club.

==== Portlethen Golf Club ====
Portlethen Golf Club was founded in 1981, and opened in 1989. The club's first professional player was Muriel Thomson: the first female golf professional in Scotland. In December 2014 she was succeeded by Stuart Wilson.

The course is a 6,663 yards par 72 with two par 3s and two par 5s in each half. The club has a clubhouse and practice facilities, including a covered driving range, practice bunkers, short-game area and putting green.

=== Other amenities ===
A Youth drop-in centre was opened in April 2007, in the old library building. There also various youth groups running regularly at Portlethen Parish Church and Jubilee Hall.

There are two main parks in Portlethen: Bourtree Park and Nicol Park. Nicol Park has a toddlers park, a skate park and two basketball courts. Bourtree Park has a football pitch, a few swings and climbing frames.

There is a community library and community centre located within Portlethen Academy. The Social Work offices of Aberdeenshire Council for the local area are located within Portlethen.

== Education ==
There has been a school in Portlethen since the nineteenth century. The original school building (used until 1860) is now the local police station.

Portlethen Primary School opened in 1962.

Portlethen Academy opened in 1987. The school was relocated to a new building in 2006. Fishermoss School, opened in 1989. Hillside Primary School opened in March 2017.

== Transport ==
Portlethen is next to the A92. It has a train station which connects to Aberdeen and Dundee. Stagecoach operate bus services to/from Portlethen.

== Community Council ==
The Portlethen & District Community Council (PDCC) monthly in Portlethen Academy, normally on the fourth Tuesday of each month and considers many issues including development proposals and transport. Meetings are open to the public and offer an opportunity to raise topics of relevance to the local community.

Portlethen Gala is a social and community event held every summer on the last Saturday in August.

== Notable people ==
- Barry Jones, a magician featured on the 2010 TV Series The Magicians, is originally from Portlethen.
- Lesley McKay, a drama teacher at Portlethen Academy, was a in-vision continuity announcer on Grampian TV in the 1980s and 90s under the name Kay Duncan.

== See also ==
- Bishops' Wars
- Craigmaroinn
- Mounth
- Portlethen Moss

== Gallery ==
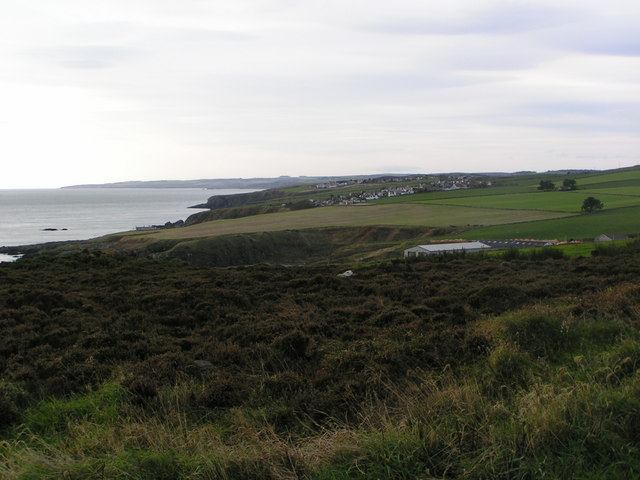
Looking towards to Portlethen from the coasts of Findon Ness

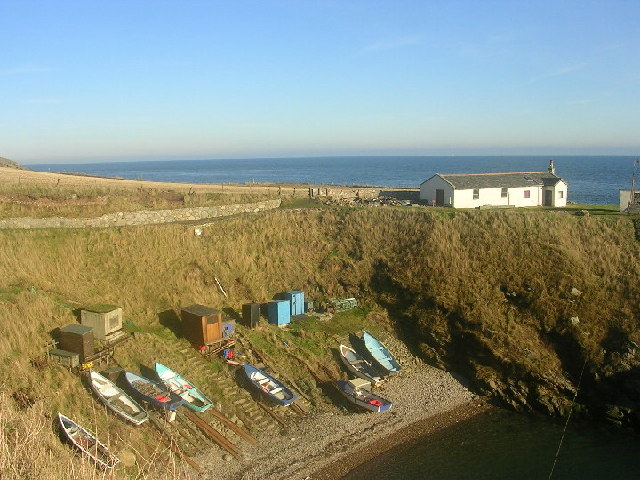
Portlethen Harbour and the North Sea

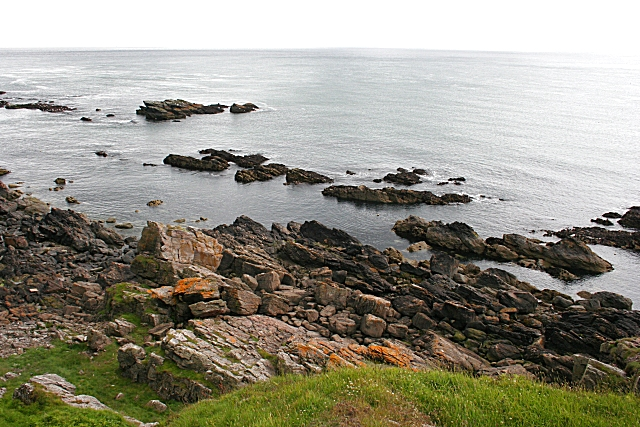
Skerry of Craigmaroinn

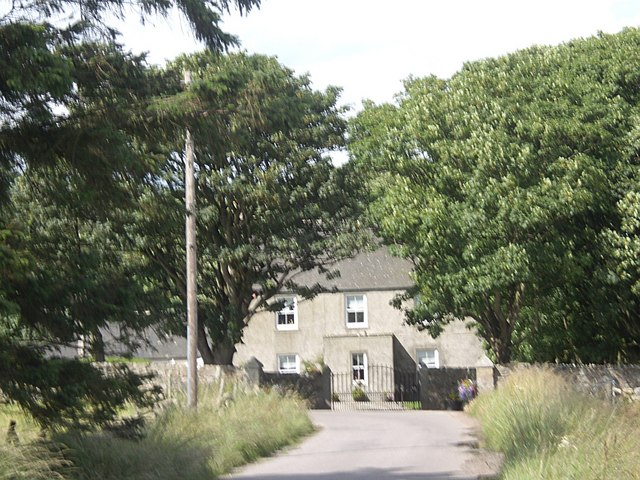
Mains of Portlethen Gated entrance

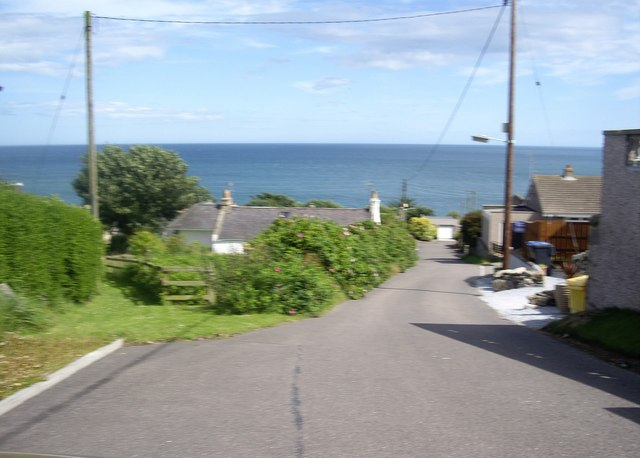
Craigmarn Road Street

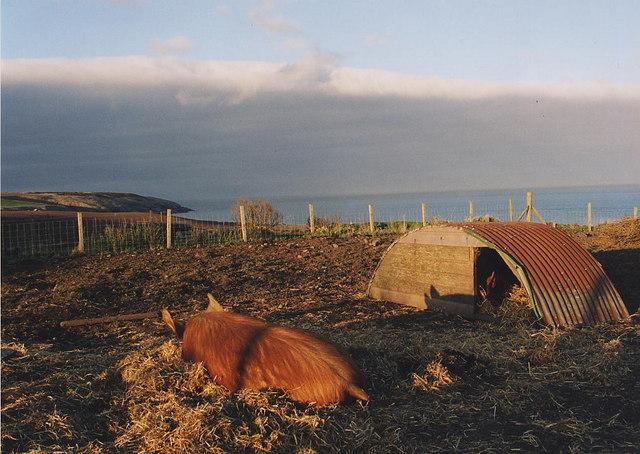
A pig of Old Portlethen
