= Portlethen Moss =

Nature reserve in Scotland

Coordinates: 57°03′27″N 02°08′51″W

The Portlethen Moss is an acidic bog nature reserve located to the west of the town of Portlethen, Aberdeenshire in Scotland. Like other mosses, this wetland area supports a variety of plant and animal species, even though it has been subject to certain development and agricultural degradation pressures. For example, the Great Crested Newt was found here prior to the expansion of the town of Portlethen. Many acid-loving vegetative species occur in Portlethen Moss, and the habitat is monitored by the Scottish Wildlife Trust.

Portlethen Moss is the location of considerable prehistoric, Middle Ages and seventeenth century history, largely due to a ridge near the bog which was the route of early travellers. By at least the Middle Ages, this trackway was more formally constructed with raised stonework and called the Causey Mounth. Without this drovers' road, travel through the Portlethen Moss and several nearby bogs would have been impossible between Aberdeen and coastal points to the south.

== History ==
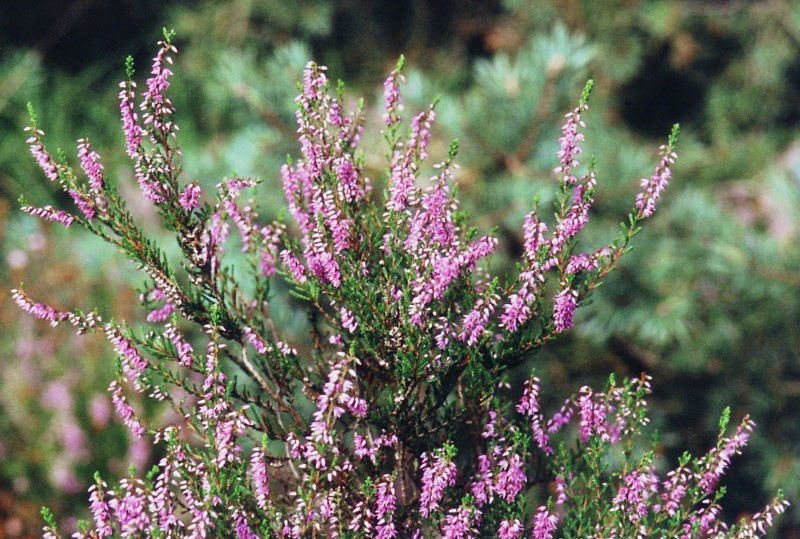
True heather, a common plant on the Portlethen Moss

Prehistoric man inhabited the Portlethen Moss area as evidenced by well-preserved Iron Age stone circles and other excavated artifacts nearby. Only the outcrops and ridge areas would have been habitable, but the desirability of primitive habitation would have been enhanced by proximity to the sea and natural defensive protection of the moss to impede intruders. From Tacitus accounts of the Roman general Agricola, it is known that the Romans were daunted by Portlethen Moss, Netherley Red Moss, Cookney Moss and other local bogs that hindered travel. This is also evidenced by the Roman Camp of Raedykes having been established immediately south of this cluster of mosses; the Romans, not being able to progress further north, turned inland toward Netherley. The Portlethen Moss is near the Grampian Mountains.

The ancient Causey Mounth passage specifically connected the Bridge of Dee to the town of Stonehaven. This route was used to access the historic meeting of the Covenanters at Muchalls Castle in the year 1638 AD as they opposed the Bishops of Aberdeen. The route was also that taken by William Keith, 7th Earl Marischal and James Graham, 1st Marquess of Montrose when they led a Covenanter army of 9000 men in the biggest battle of the Bishops' Wars in 1639

Further to the east of Portlethen Moss lie three original coastal fishing villages: Findon, Portlethen Village and Downies. In the period from 1960 to 2005, Portlethen has developed as a dormitory town to Aberdeen and a location for retail superstores.

== Conservation status ==
The Portlethen Moss is a recognised nature preserve by the Scottish Wildlife Trust (with designation PLM076) and the Aberdeenshire Council. While peat cutting was conducted in prehistoric and Middle Ages times, there has been no harvesting of peat in the modern era. There is some ongoing loss of moss habitat from cattle grazing, but the most significant threat is from ongoing land development pressure; in fact, half of the Portlethen Moss has been lost to urban (low-density) land development by the town of Portlethen during the period 1985 to 2005. Trampling is considered an insignificant threat due to the small animal or human presence in the existing nature reserve area; furthermore, cattle grazing, while ongoing, is deemed a much lesser current threat than population expansion pressure. Enrichment (addition of grazing animal manure) is not a major issue due to the low density of animals. As a net result, damage to the primordial moss is considered extensive and widespread by the Scottish Wildlife Trust. The raised bog habitat of the Portlethen Moss is also protected by the United Kingdom Biodiversity Action Plan.

== Topography and meteorology ==
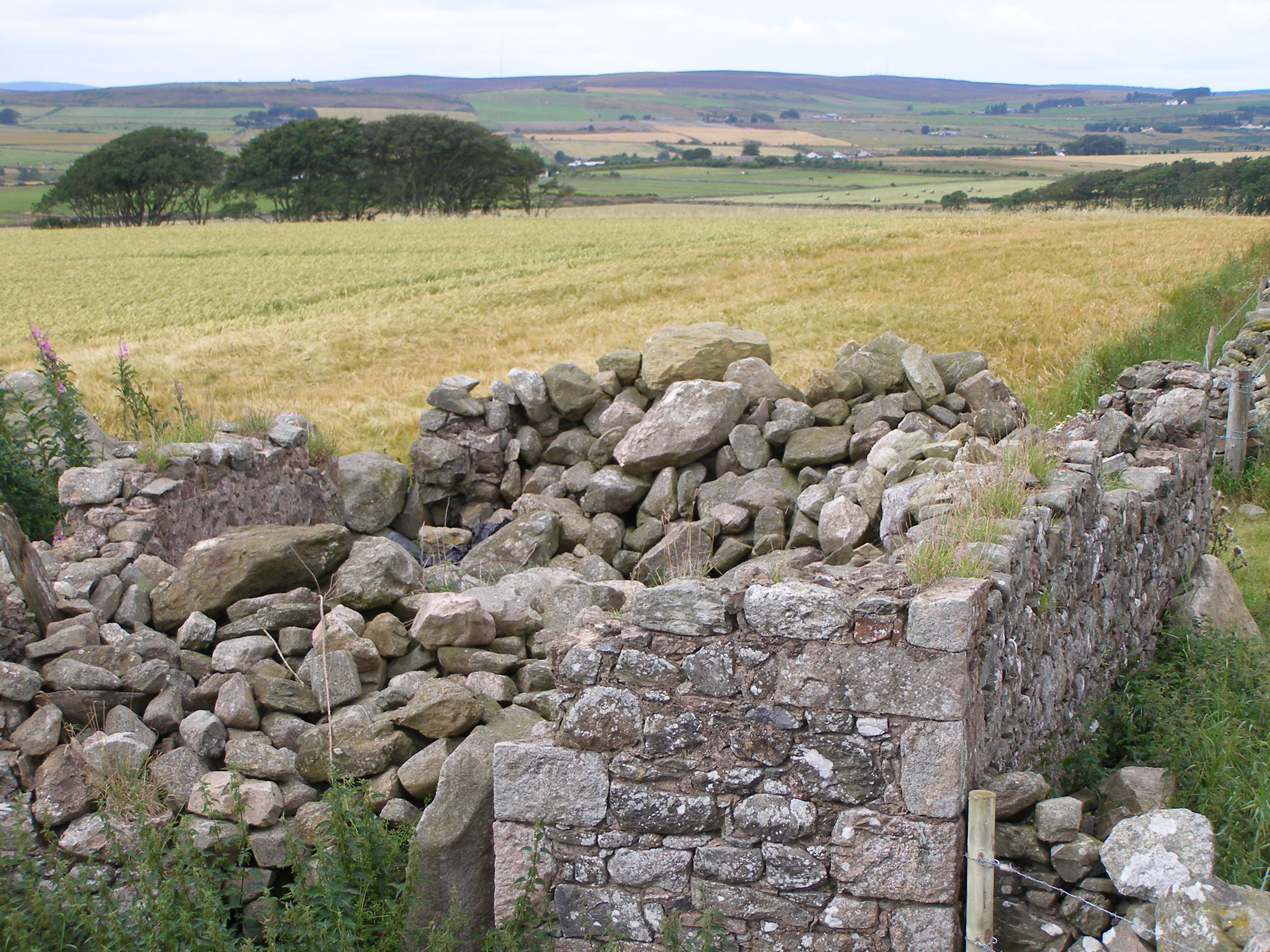
Ruined Episcopal chapel from 18th century south of the Portlethen Moss along the Causey Mounth

Portlethen Moss is considered a raised bog, because its general situation is on higher ground, at the edge of the Mounth, a coastal mountain spur of the Grampian Mountains overlooking the North Sea. There are rock outcrops and strewn boulders relict from the glacial age at this site. Elevations within the Portlethen Moss range from approximately 35 to 60 metres above sea level. Formation of this moss has occurred due to extensive sets of depressions in the underlying rock formations of Old Red Sandstone. The entire water composition of the bog thus has been provided by precipitation with no source of surface runoff, since the topography reduces to lower elevations in every direction. Due to the high winds, moderate precipitation and cool temperatures that generally prevail, conditions are favourable for the formation of an acid bog, since water stagnates, but eventually evaporates with ensuing acidity enhancement of decaying organic matter. There was virtually no drainage outlet in prehistoric times, and little drainage even in modern times.

== Evolution of Portlethen Moss ==
Many coastal mosses were initiated by the process of glaciation, which sheared rock formations to a generally level terrain, while also gouging moderate-sized craters that would pond. This description fits the fundamental situation of Portlethen Moss, where sphagnum would have flourished over millennia of evaporation, further intensifying the soil acidity, fueled by organic matter decaying, with little drainage outlet. A layer of sphagnum moss would have developed at the benthic level of the bog, and additional sphagnum layers floated in mats atop the bog.

At an intermediate level of evolution, thick peat layers formed from the decay and carbonisation of the rotting sphagnum. Generations of Carex and Juncus flourished, leading to further decay of these materials and eventual heightening of the organic mass. Finally, secondary vegetation took root in the spongy sphagnum mats, adding greater biomass to the bog. In some cases, the heavily saturated organic layers could rupture, spilling large volumes of mud and organic debris into surrounding fields, thus enabling a bed for further spatial expansion of the entire bog. Ultimately, the colour of the moss waters became blood red from the successive organic decay and stagnation. Only in times associated with cattle grazing and significant human presence (probably the late Iron Age) would this process reverse and the bog reduce in size.

== Vegetation ==
A wide variety of sphagnum, sedges, rushes and other characteristic bog species inhabit Portlethen Moss. Sometimes, insectivorous plants reside in mosses, since the soils are generally nutrient-poor. The heath also serves as a food source for the area roe deer, while Corydalis claviculata is an attractive host for numerous butterfly larvae. Representative plant species found in this nature reserve include:

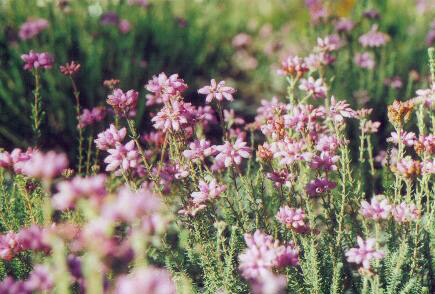
Erica tetralix, a wildflower found on the Portlethen Moss

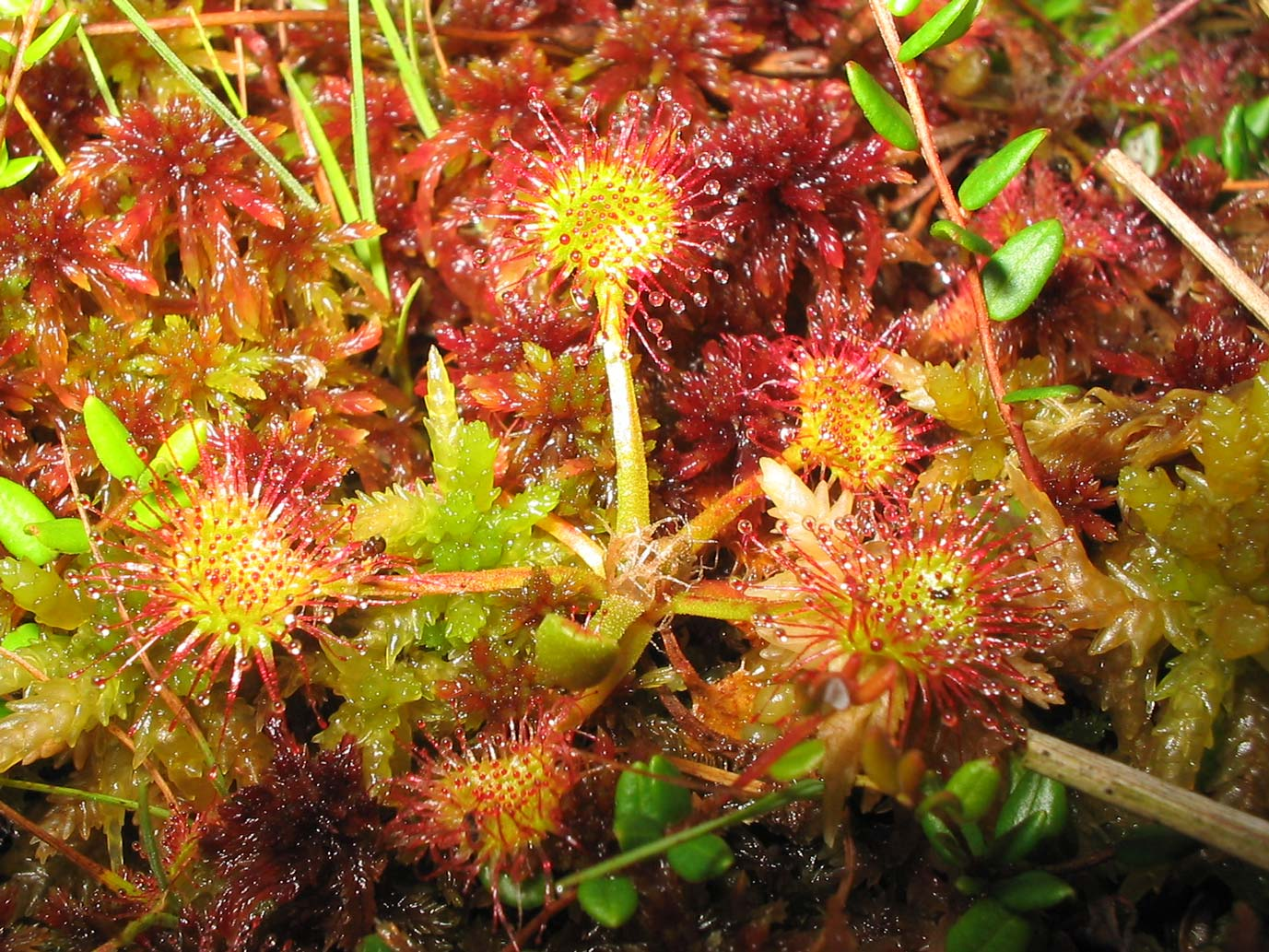
Insectivorous sundew plants are found at Portlethen Moss

- Agrostis canina, velvet bentgrass
- Anthoxanthum odoratum
- Arrhenatherum elatius, tall meadow oat grass
- Aulacomnium palustre
- Betula pubescens, downy birch
- Calluna vulgaris, true heather
- Cardamine amara, large bittercress
- Carex curta
- Carex demissa
- Carex echinata, Murray sedge
- Cirsium arvense, creeping thistle
- Corydalis claviculata,
- Dactylis glomerata, cocksfoot grass
- Dactylorhiza maculata
- Deschampsia flexuosa, tussock grass
- Dicranum scoparium
- Drosera rotundifolia, round-leaved sundew (insectivorous)
- Dryopteris dilatata, broad buckler fern
- Epilobium palustre
- Erica tetralix, cross leaved heath
- Eriophorum vaginatum, cotton grass
- Festuca ovina, sheep's fescue
- Hypnum cupressiforme
- Juncus bulbosus
- Neottia cordata, a rare plant
- Potentilla palustris
- Salix cinerea
- Sphagnum capillifolium
- Sphagnum squarrosum
- Ulex europaeus
- Urtica dioica, stinging nettle
- Viola palustris, marsh violet

== Relation to other mosses ==
There are numerous mosses or bog habitats in Scotland, many of them situated also in Aberdeenshire, including the Cookney Moss, Leuchar Moss and Red Moss of Netherley nearby. Many other shires within Scotland that contain mosses such as Fife, Angus, Morayshire and Lanarkshire. Some of these are lowland bogs and others, like Portlethen Moss, are raised bogs. There are other similar acidic peat bogs in the northern part of North America, Russia and northern Europe, but in those locations, they are usually called "bogs".

== See also ==
- Acid rain
- Fen
- Haraldskær Woman
- Surface runoff
