= William Keith, 7th Earl Marischal =

Scottish noble

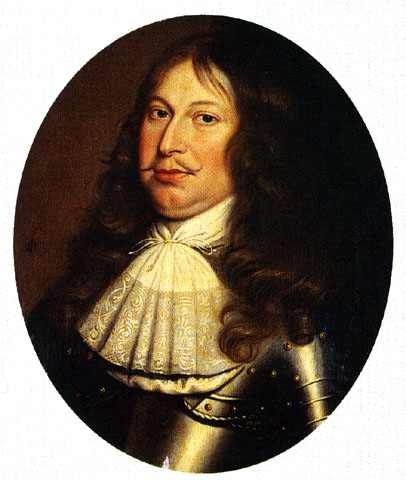
William Keith, The 7th Earl Marischal.

William Keith, 7th Earl Marischal (1614 – 1670 or 1671) was a Scottish nobleman and Covenanter. He was the eldest son of William Keith, 6th Earl Marischal.

== Life ==
During the English Civil War, the 7th Earl Marischal joined James Graham, 1st Marquess of Montrose against the Gordons and twice seized Aberdeen in 1639, including a march with Montrose and 9,000 men along the Causey Mounth past Muchalls Castle and through the Portlethen Moss to attack via the Bridge of Dee.

He was appointed a Lord of the Articles after the pacification of Berwick-upon-Tweed, and again seized Aberdeen and enforced signatures of the covenant in 1640. In 1641, he was appointed a Privy Councillor.

He attended covenanting committees in the north but remained inactive in 1643–44. He subsequently refused to give up fugitives to Montrose, and was besieged at Dunnottar Castle in 1645. He took no active steps against the popular party until he joined Hamilton's expedition into England in 1648, escaping from the rout at the Battle of Preston, and entertained Charles II at Dunnottar in 1650. In 1651, the Scottish regalia were left for safe keeping in his castle. He was arrested at Alyth with many other Scottish nobles and generals in an incident known as 'the Onfall of Alyth' and imprisoned in the Tower of London until the Restoration, when he was appointed Keeper of the Privy Seal of Scotland.

The Earl Marischal married, in 1637, Lady Elizabeth Seton (1621–1650), daughter of George Seton, 3rd Earl of Winton, by his spouse Lady Anna Hay, daughter of Francis Hay, 9th Earl of Erroll. They had the following issue:

- William Keith, Lord Keith, died young.
- Mary Keith, married firstly to Sir James Hope of Hopetoun in 1657, and secondly to Sir Archibald Murray, 3rd Baronet of Blackbarony.
- Elizabeth Keith, married in 1658, Robert Arbuthnot, 2nd Viscount Arbuthnot
- Jean Keith, married in 1669, George Ogilvy, 3rd Lord Banff

== Arms ==
Coat of arms of the Earl Marischal
Crest A Hart's Head erased proper armed with ten Tynes Or. Escutcheon Argent on a Chief Gules three Palets Or; behind the shield two Baton Gules semy of Thistles ensigned on the top with an Imperial Crown Or placed saltirewise being the insignia of the office of Great Marischal of Scotland. Supporters On either side a Hart proper attired as in the Crest. Motto Veritas Vincit (Truth conquers)

== See also ==
- Cromwell's Act of Grace under which the earl's estates were confiscated by the Commonwealth.

Political offices
Preceded by The Earl of Sutherland	Keeper of the Privy Seal of Scotland; 1641–1649	Succeeded by The Earl of Dunfermline
Peerage of Scotland
Preceded by William Keith	Earl Marischal; 1635–1671	Succeeded by George Keith
