= Bridge of Dee =

Road bridge in Aberdeen, Scotland

Bridge of Dee Brig o Dee (Scots)
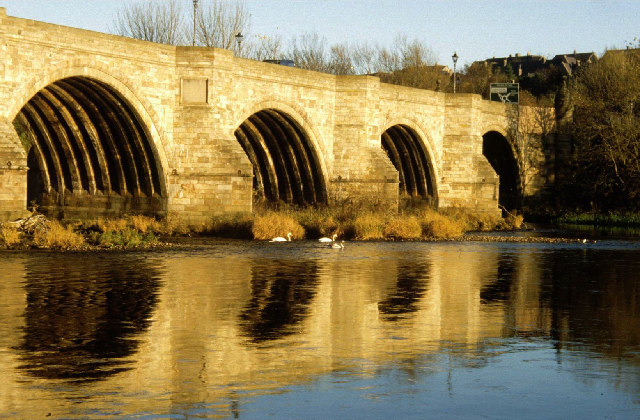
- Bridge of Dee crossing the River Dee
- Coordinates: 57.12289°N 2.11888°W
- OS grid reference: NJ 92901 03557
- Carries: A92
- Crosses: River Dee
- Locale: Aberdeen
- Named for: River Dee
- Preceded by: Shakkin' Briggie (Note: Shakkin' Briggie is currently unpassable.)
- Followed by: King George VI Bridge

Characteristics
- Material: Granite and sandstone
- No. of spans: 7

History
- Built: 1527
- Rebuilt: 1718-1723

Listed Building – Category A
- Official name: Stonehaven Road And Anderson Drive South, Bridge Of Dee, Over River Dee, Including Sundial
- Designated: 12 January 1967
- Reference no.: LB20068

Location
- Interactive map of Bridge of Dee

The Bridge of Dee or Brig o Dee is a road bridge over the River Dee in Aberdeen, Scotland. The term is also used for the surrounding area of the city. Dating from 1527, the bridge crosses at what was once the City of Aberdeen's southern boundary.

The Bridge of Dee is approximately 32 feet (10 m) above typical water height and consists of seven nearly semicircular ribbed arches, built using granite and Elgin sandstone. Today the bridge carries the main A92 road into Aberdeen from the south.

It was designated a Category A listed structure in 1967, and was also listed as a Scheduled monument until being de-scheduled on 16 February 2009.

George Gordon, 6th Earl of Huntly with his Catholic supporters rebelled against James VI of Scotland and confronted the King at the Brig of Dee on 17 April 1589. There was no battle and Huntly surrendered a few day later. The bridge was the site of a battle in 1639 between the Royalists under Viscount Aboyne and the Covenanters who were led by the Marquess of Montrose and Earl Marischal. This was the only substantial action of the First Bishops' War, and it took place after the peace treaty had already been signed.

== History ==
The bridge was built following a bequest of £20,000 by Bishop William Elphinstone who died in 1514. The bridge was completed by Bishop Gavin Dunbar. It was nearly all rebuilt between 1718 and 1723, and in 1841 was widened from 14 to 26 feet (from four to eight metres) under the direction of Aberdeen City Architect John Smith. Smith also designed the Shakkin' Briggie, and worked on the Bridge of Don with Telford and Wellington Suspension Bridge with Captain Samuel Brown.

The bridge is located near the northern terminus of the Causey Mounth, a medieval drovers' road connecting Stonehaven to Aberdeen. This ancient trackway specifically connected the Bridge of Dee via Bourtreebush, Muchalls Castle and Stonehaven to the south. The route was that taken by William Keith, 7th Earl Marischal and the Marquess of Montrose when they led a Covenanter army of 9000 men in the first battle of the Civil War in 1639. The following contemporary verse was written about the battle.

Muskies mother [a large cannon] has made a vow
That she will take her venter [dare to go],
And thunder throughe (the) brige of Dee
Led by a Covenanter.

The Covenanters that ye see
Come marching alongest the grein [open grassy ground],
Wer not for feare of God they say,
They wold plounder Aberdeine.

A chapel had been built right next to the bridge as a resting place for pilgrims travelling to and from Aberdeen. There appears to be no record showing when it was built but we know that an inventory was made by the Chaplin Sir William Ray. This may have been done prior to a legal battle. Gordon of Abergeldie petitioned Aberdeen town council on 27 February 1530 claiming that the chapel prevented him having easy access to his fishing rights in the river. Having lost the court case Gordon removed one of the buttresses to the bridge to make a footpath for his men to get to the river. Consequently, Aberdeen Town Council, the owners of the bridge, started legal action against him in Edinburgh High Court.

Until 1832, this was the only access to the city from the south. The bridge still features the original 16th-century piers, coats of arms and passing places.

== See also ==
- List of bridges in Scotland
- Transport in Aberdeen
