= Mounth =

Mountainous region in Scotland

- The Mounth, am Monadh
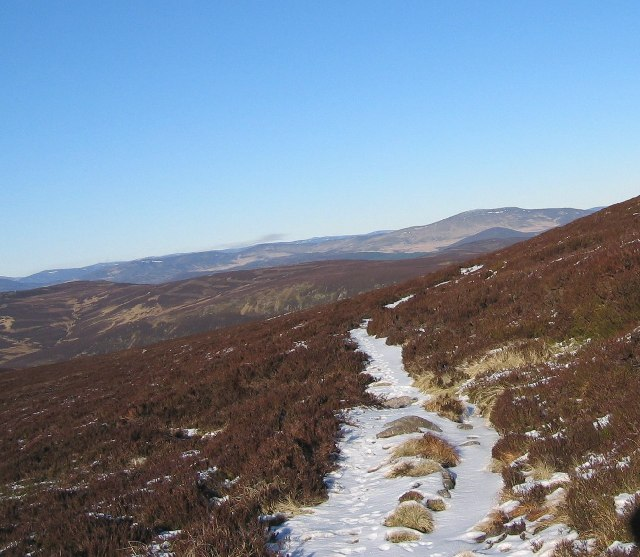
- Typical Mounth scenery

Highest point
- Coordinates: 57.043°N 2.627°W

Naming
- English translation: "Mountain"
- Language of name: Pictish/Common Brittonic

Geography
- Location within Scotland
- Location: Aberdeenshire, Scotland

The Mounth (/ˈmʌnθ/ MUNTH) is the broad upland in northeast Scotland between the Highland Boundary and the River Dee, at the eastern end of the Grampians.

== Name and etymology ==
The name Mounth is ultimately of Pictish origin. The name is derived from *monɪð, meaning "mountain" (cf. Welsh mynydd).

It is invariably referred to as "the Mounth" and pronounced "munth".

== Details ==
The ranges to the north-west are known as the Monadh Liath and the Monadh Ruadh (called the Cairngorms in English), meaning the Grey Mounth and the Red Mounth.

Some sources regard the Mounth as extending as far west as Drumochter Pass (A9), but it is now generally agreed to start at the Cairnwell Pass (A93 – highest main road pass in Britain, Glen Shee ski centre). Here, a high undulating plateau invaded by deep glacial troughs (Glen Isla, Glen Callater, Glen Muick, Glen Clova) culminates in Glas Maol (1,068 m or 3,504 ft) on the main watershed, with the outlying granite Lochnagar (1,155 m or 3,789 ft) and its surrounding "White Mounth" (Monadh Geal). To the east the plateau broadens into a lower moorland incised by river valleys, notably Glen Esk and Glen Tanar, descending gently east to North Sea coastal cliffs between Stonehaven and Aberdeen. This is the best-preserved expanse of the ancient Highland pre-glacial upland surface.

The Mounth is thus bounded by Blairgowrie, Braemar, Ballater, Banchory, Stonehaven, and Kirriemuir, and comprises eastern Highland Perthshire, the Angus Glens, and southern Aberdeenshire. The higher parts are within the Cairngorms National Park.

Historically The Mounth was a formidable barrier which, to some extent, isolated the northeast of Scotland from the rest of the Scottish Lowlands, physically and culturally. In the Middle Ages an ancient roadway known as the Causey Mounth was built to connect Stonehaven to Aberdeen using an elevated rock causeway design to penetrate this boggy area of the eastern Mounth. This route was by way of Cowie Castle, Muchalls Castle, Portlethen Moss and the Bridge of Dee. The route was that taken by Earl Marischal and the Marquess of Montrose when they led a Covenanter army of 9000 men in the first battle of the Wars of the Three Kingdoms in 1639.

== Crossings of the Mounth ==
There are numerous historic crossings of the Mounth, including:

- Causey Mounth or Cowie Mounth, between Bridge of Cowie near Stonehaven and the Bridge of Dee.
- Elsick Mounth or Netherley Road, from Stonehaven to Drum, followed by the modern B979 road
- The Slug Road, from Stonehaven to Durris, followed by the modern A957 road
- Cryn's Cross Mounth, from Laurencekirk to Mills of Drum
- The Stock Mounth, from Glenbervie to Strachan
- Builg Mounth, from Glenfarquhar to Deeside
- Cairnamounth or Cairn O' Mounth, from Fettercairn to Kincardine o' Neill, followed by the modern B974 road
- Fungle Road or Forest of Birse Mounth, from Glen Esk to Aboyne via the Forest of Birse
- Firmounth, from Glen Esk to Glen Tanar
- Keenmounth, from Innermarkie to Deeside over the shoulder of Mount Keen
- Capel Mounth, from Glen Clova to Glen Muick
- Tolmounth or Jock's Road, from Glen Doll to Glen Callater
- Monega Pass, from Glen Isla to Glen Clunie
- Carnvalage or Cairnwell Road, from Gleann Beag to Glen Clunie, over the Devil's Elbow, and followed by the modern A93 road

== See also ==
- Cairn O' Mounth
- Dubhtolargg
- Saddle Hill (Aberdeenshire)
