= Saddle Hill =

Saddle Hill is the name of several places worldwide:

- Saddle Hill (Aberdeenshire) in Aberdeenshire, Scotland
- Saddle Hill (Antarctica), in the Freyberg Mountains, Victoria Land, Antarctica
- Saddle Hill (Monterrey) in Monterrey, México
- Saddle Hill, New Zealand in Otago, New Zealand
- Saddle Hill (Saint Kitts and Nevis) on the island of Nevis, Saint Kitts and Nevis
- Saddle Hill, on the frontier between Quebec, Canada and Maine, USA
