= Dubhtolargg =

Talorc was a king of the Picts in the Early Middle Ages from 778 until 782 He was slain at a location beyond the Mounth in a chronicle that appears to be the first literature reference to the Mounth of the Grampian Mountains.
