= Cryne Corse Mounth =

Drovers' road in Aberdeenshire, Scotland

Coordinates: 56.99418°N 2.38462°W

Cryne Corse Mounth is an old droving road which ran south across the high ground from the Dee valley in Aberdeenshire, eastern Scotland. Much of the route is now afforested. It is one of a number of old tracks which passed over the Mounth, an eastern extension of the Grampian Mountains.

The route departs the modern A957 road at a sharp bend at Spyhill and climbs steeply to the vicinity of Red Beard's Well near the Durris transmitting station. The well itself is named from the leader of a gang of highwaymen who lay in wait for travellers on this route. At its south end the route meets the public road near Cleuchead north of Glenbervie. Almost all of the route now lies within an area of conifer plantations, known in part as Fetteresso Forest.

Edward I is said to have used the route in 1296, as subsequently did William Wallace. Cattle were driven along the route to Herscha Hill, north of Fordoun where an annual cattle fair known as St Palladius' or Paldy Fair was held each July.

An alternative name for the route is Cryne Cross. Parts of the route are annotated on modern Ordnance Survey mapping as 'Cryne Corse Road (Track)'.
