= Saddle Hill (Aberdeenshire) =

Mountain in eastern Aberdeenshire, Scotland

Coordinates: 57.0137°N 2.2734°W

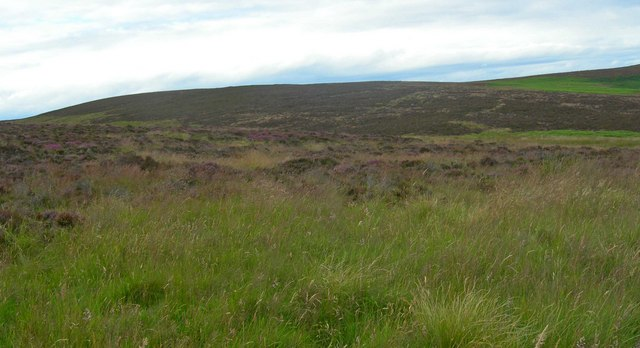
Saddle Hill

Saddle Hill is a low lying mountain in eastern Aberdeenshire, Scotland within the Mounth Range of the Grampian Mountains. Its peak is 241 metres (791 ft) above mean sea level. This hill is immediately north of the Roman camp of Raedykes. From Saddle Hill there are expansive views to the North Sea facing east and the valley of the Burn of Monboys to the east and southeast.

== Geology and hydrology ==
Saddle Hill is situated approximately 5 kilometres (3.1 mi) to the northwest of Stonehaven; surface runoff and drainage from the easternand southern slopes of Saddle Hill flow to the Burn of Monboys, a very slightly alkaline stream These low pH levels (compared to other area streams) may be caused in part by the peat drainage from the moorland on Meikle Carewe Hill and Curlethney Hill.

== Prehistory ==
Neolithic traces of civilisation appear on the southwest flanks of the lower slopes of Saddle Hill in the form of cairns and standing stones.

== Wind farm proposal ==
Renewable Energy Resources has an application pending before the Aberdeenshire Council to create a windfarm for electrical power generation using Saddle Hill, Curlethney Hill, Meikle Carewe Hill (the two latter hills situated slightly to the west of Saddle Hill to install 12 wind turbines. Each turbine would reach a height of 70 metres above grade level, and the entire complex could generate enough power to supply the equivalent of 5000 homes. Environmental concerns over the proposal include noise pollution, visual impact and ecological disturbance.

== See also ==
- Fetteresso Castle
- Megray Hill
