= Slug Road =

Road in Scotland

Coordinates: 57°00′47″N 2°22′08″W

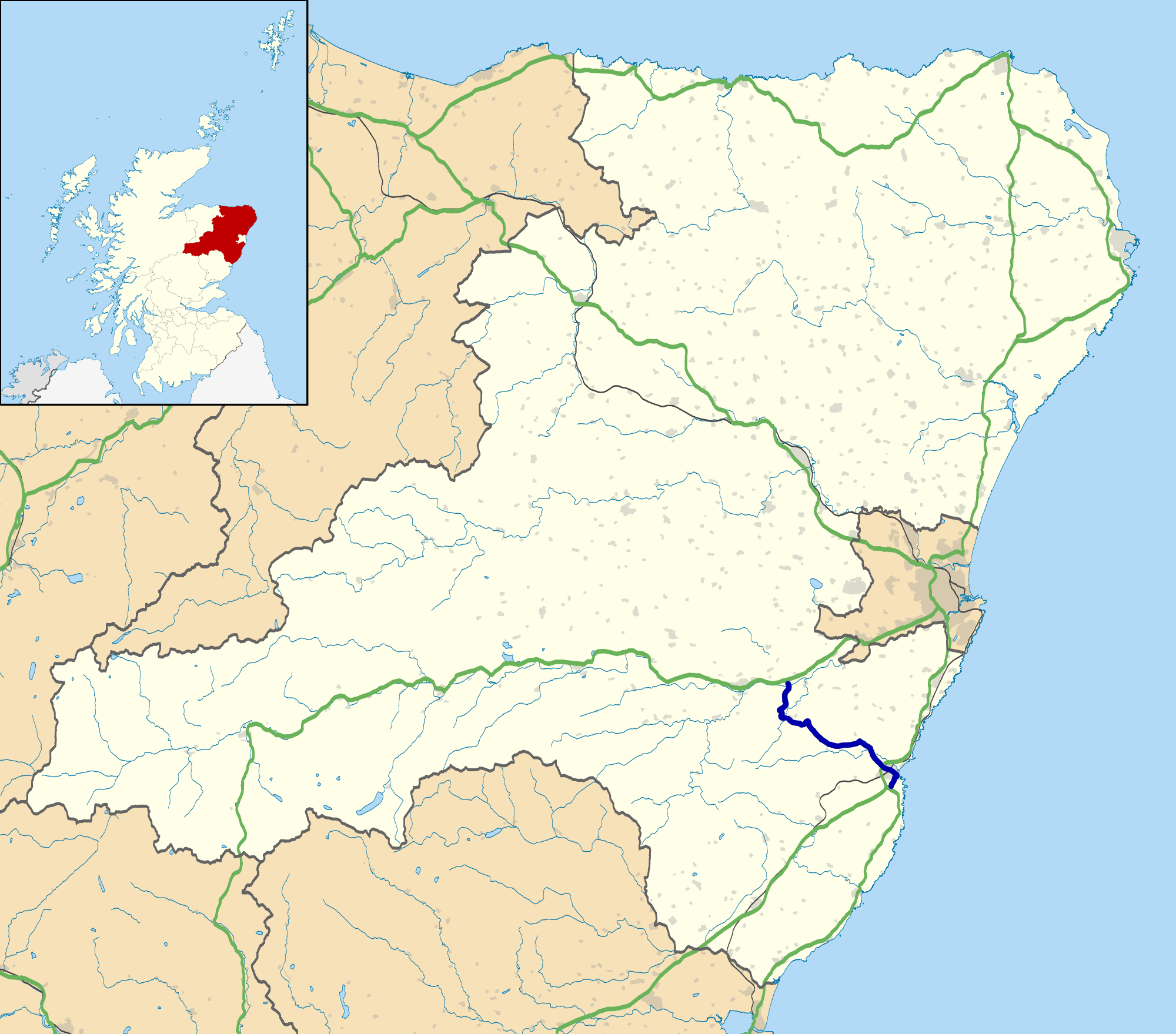
Map of Aberdeenshire showing the A957

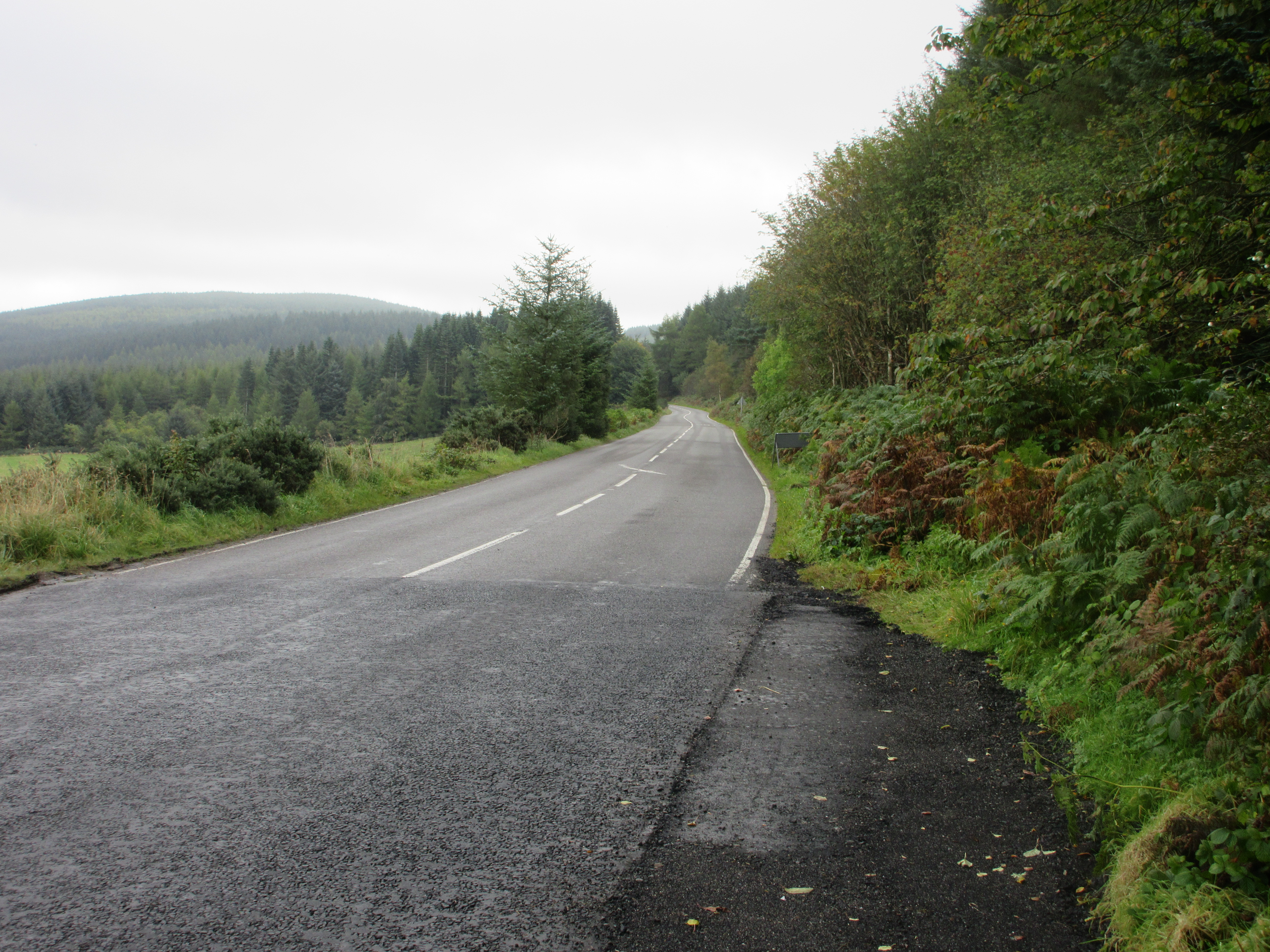
The Slug Road at Spyhill

The Slug Road (A957) is a 13-mile road in Aberdeenshire, Scotland. It runs from Stonehaven in the Mearns to Banchory in Deeside, crossing a spur of the Grampians. The pass through which it runs is known as the Slug (from the Gaelic word sloc, meaning "hollow") and lies between the hills Craigbeg and Cairn-mon-earn.

Lewis Grassic Gibbon describes the Guthrie family travelling along the Slug Road in bad weather as they move to Kinraddie in his novel Sunset Song.
