= Cairn o' Mount =

Hill in Aberdeenshire, Scotland

Coordinates: 56°54′56″N 2°34′46″W

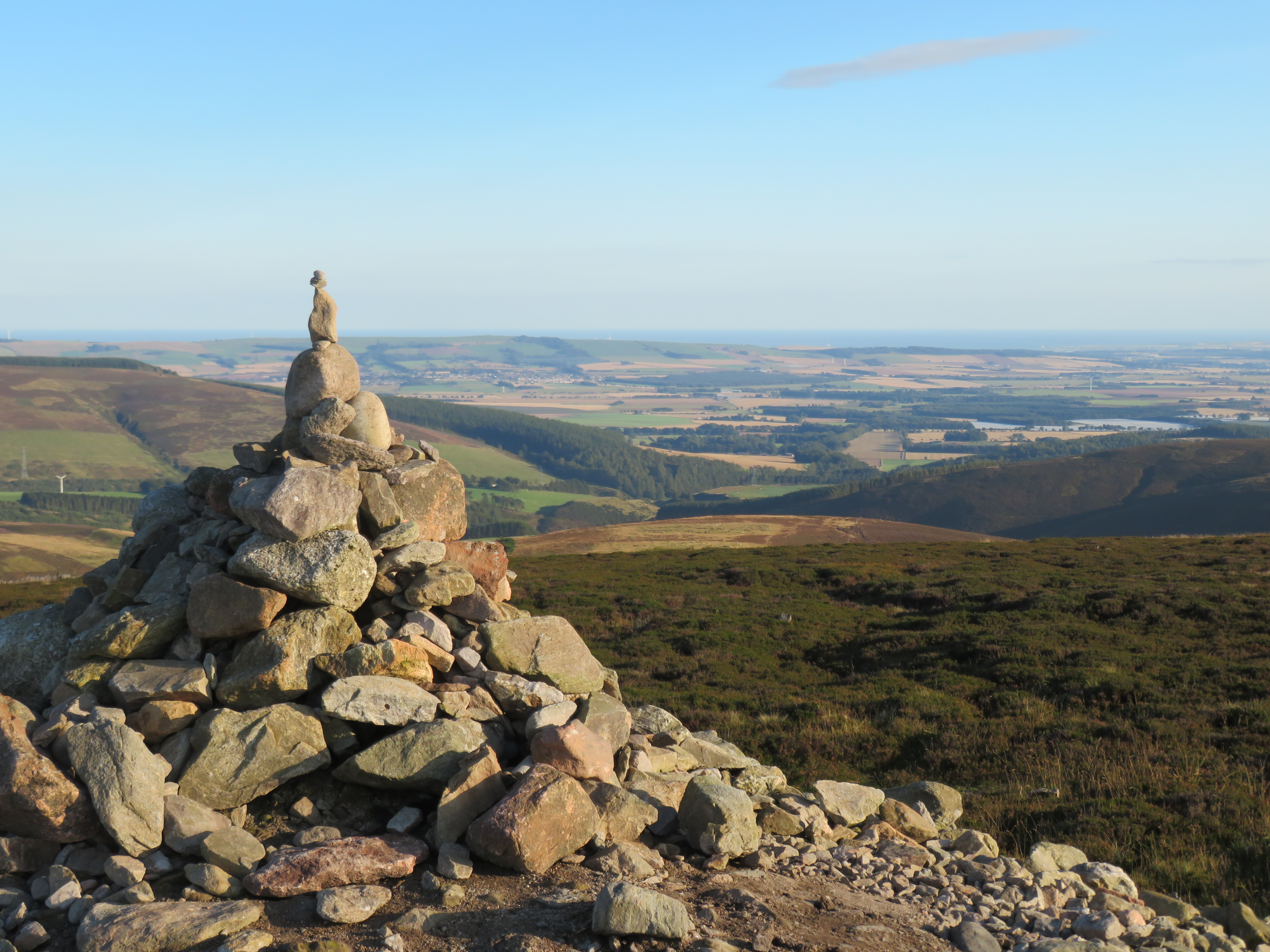
View of the Mearns and the North Sea beyond from the summit of the Cairn o' Mount

The Cairn o' Mount or Cairn o' Mounth is a hill in Aberdeenshire, Scotland, rising to 455 metres (1,493 ft). The B974 road crosses its summit, connecting the Howe of the Mearns with Deeside.

Before the modern A90 road was constructed, the Cairn o' Mount pass served as one of eight major crossing points for those travelling over the Grampians into northern Scotland. The Scottish Tourist Board describes the modern B974 as an "adventurous" road, and it is often impassable due to snow or flooding in winter.

The pass was used by Edward I's army in 1296 when they were en route back to England. It was also used twice by Viscount Dundee's army during the first Jacobite rising of 1689. The route over the pass is probably prehistoric: there is a cairn in the pass that has been dated to approximately 2000 BC. It is possible that this cairn is the one named in the name of the Cairn o' Mount.
