= Caisteal Grugaig =

Iron Age broch in Scotland

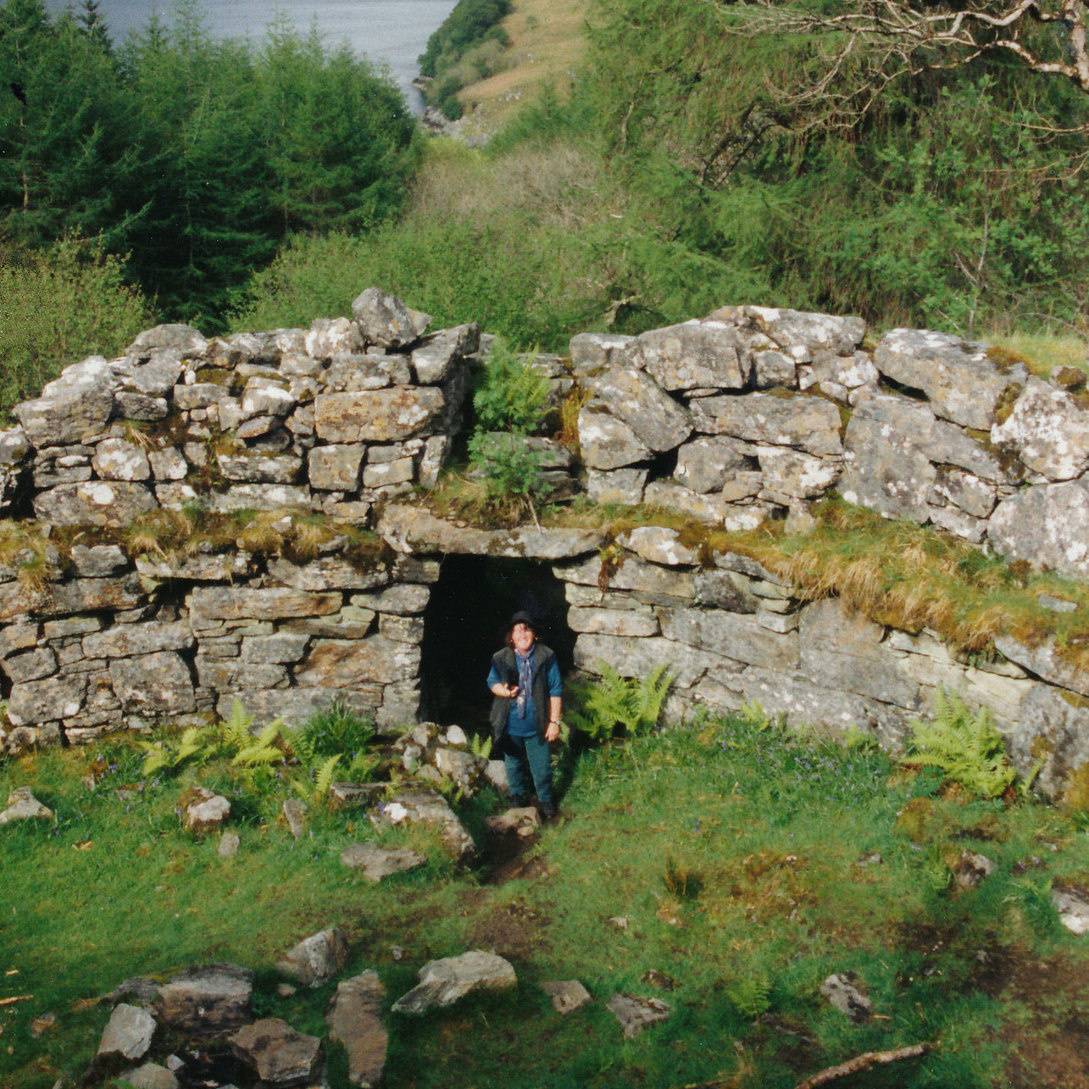
- Interior of Caisteal Grugaig

- Location within Highland
- 57.26649°N 5.539271°W
- Type: Broch
- Periods: Iron Age
- Location: Scottish Highlands

Caisteal Grugaig (or Dun Totaig) is an Iron Age broch near the eastern end of Loch Alsh in the Scottish Highlands (grid reference NG86682508).

== Location ==
The broch is located in the district of Lochalsh, and is about 9 kilometres northwest of Shiel Bridge. It stands on a small rocky knoll on a grassy slope.

The "Glenelg Brochs" of Dun Telve and Dun Troddan are a few miles to the south. Caisteal Grugaig should not be confused with the "semi-broch" known as Dun Grugaig which is also near Glenelg.

== Description ==
The broch has an external diameter of around 16.5 metres and an internal diameter of around 9.6 metres. The broch was built on uneven ground, so the natural floor of the broch has a slope. The entrance passage is on the northeast side and has a massive triangular lintel over the doorway. There is an elongated guard cell on the left side of the entrance passage.

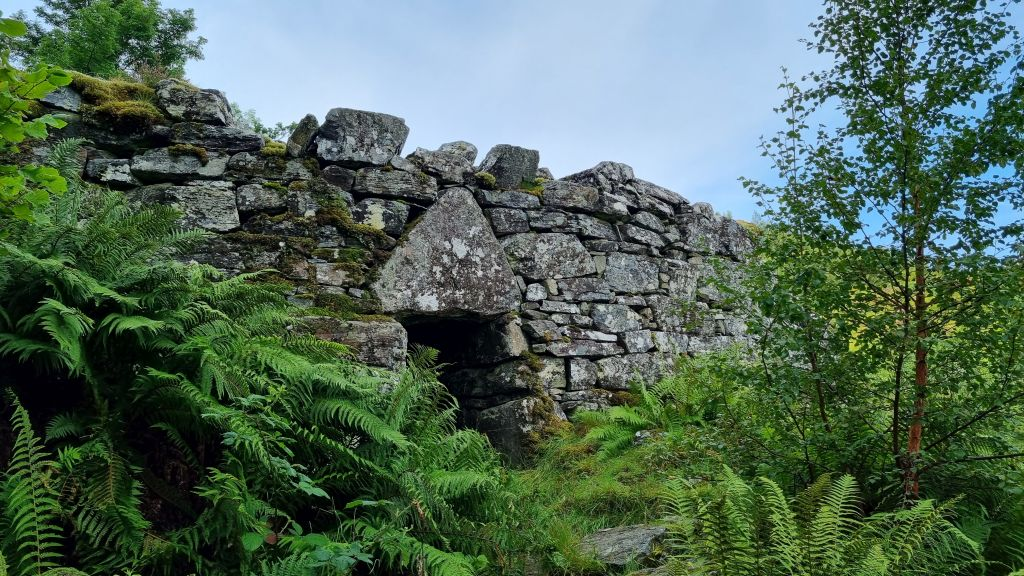
Caisteal Grugaig entrance

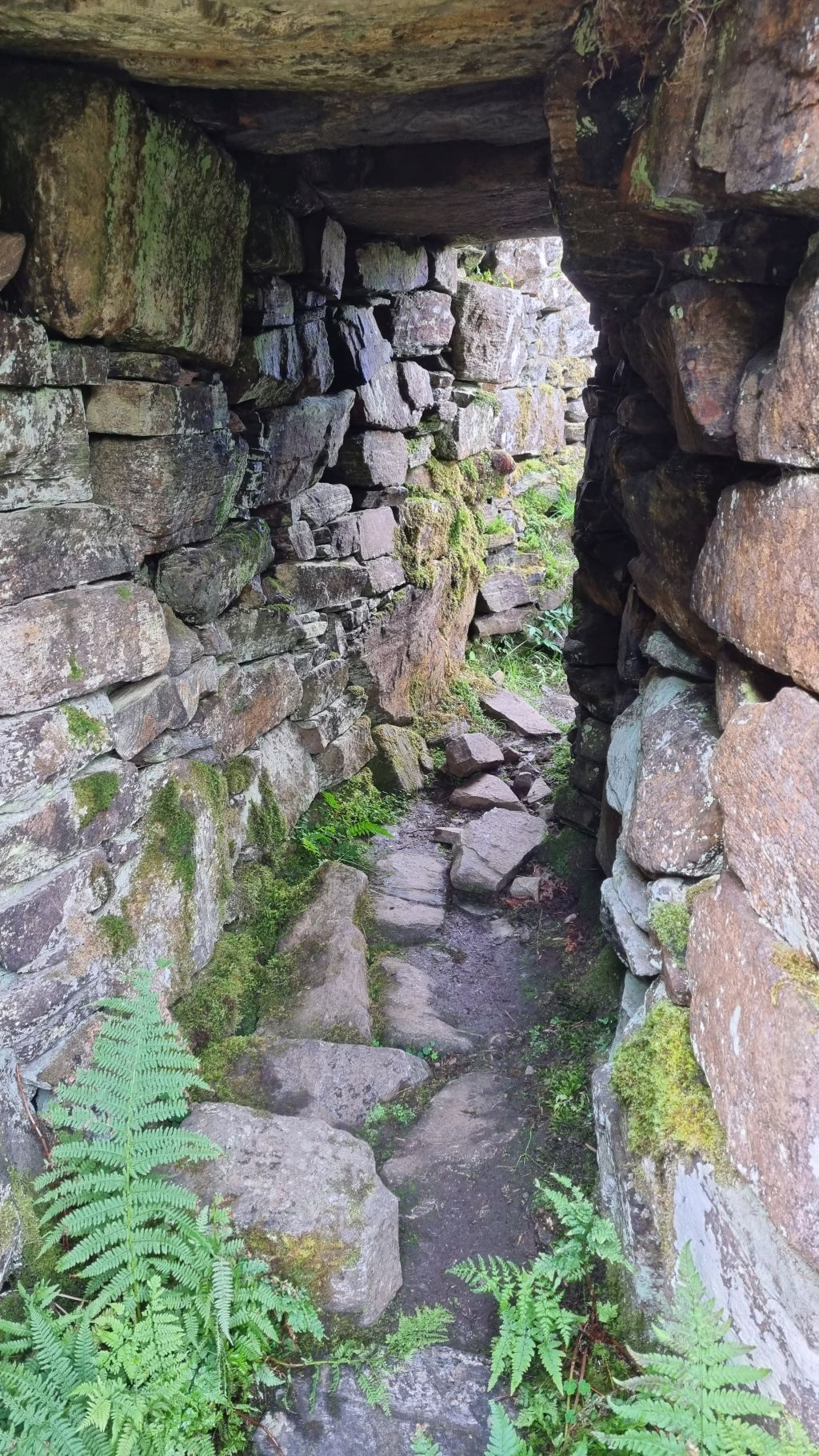
A passageway in the wall of the Caisteal Grugaig broch.

The interior of the broch has two intramural rooms at ground level, one of which is a small, oval cell. The other is a long mural cell, or length of ground gallery, which has a blocked doorway. The sides of an upper room are apparent above the entrance passage. Also inside the broch is a doorway to the mural stair. The five steps of the stair lead up to a long landing which leads to the beginning of a second flight of stairs.

== Excavations ==
The broch was cleared out in 1889 and no detailed record of the excavation seems to have survived. Another attempt at excavation was conducted in 1924 with minimal results. In the National Museum of Scotland is a decorated steatite cup apparently from this site.
