= Beinn a' Chapuill =

Coordinates: 57.177°N 5.594°W

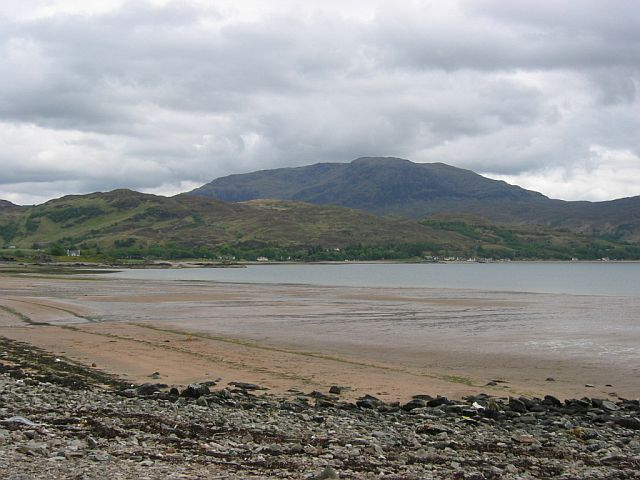
- Beinn a' Chapuill from near Glenelg

Highest point
- Elevation: 759 m (2,490 ft)
- Prominence: 258 m (846 ft)
- Listing: Graham, Marilyn

Geography
- Location: Ross and Cromarty, Scotland
- Parent range: Northwest Highlands
- OS grid: NG828152
- Topo map: OS Landranger 33

Beinn a' Chapuill (759 m) is a mountain in the Northwest Highlands of Scotland. It is located in Ross and Cromarty, close to the community of Glenelg.

A rugged peak, its finest feature is its long east ridge. The famous brochs of Dun Telve and Dun Troddan lie in close proximity.
