= Dun Grugaig =

D-shaped dun or "semi-broch" in Scotland

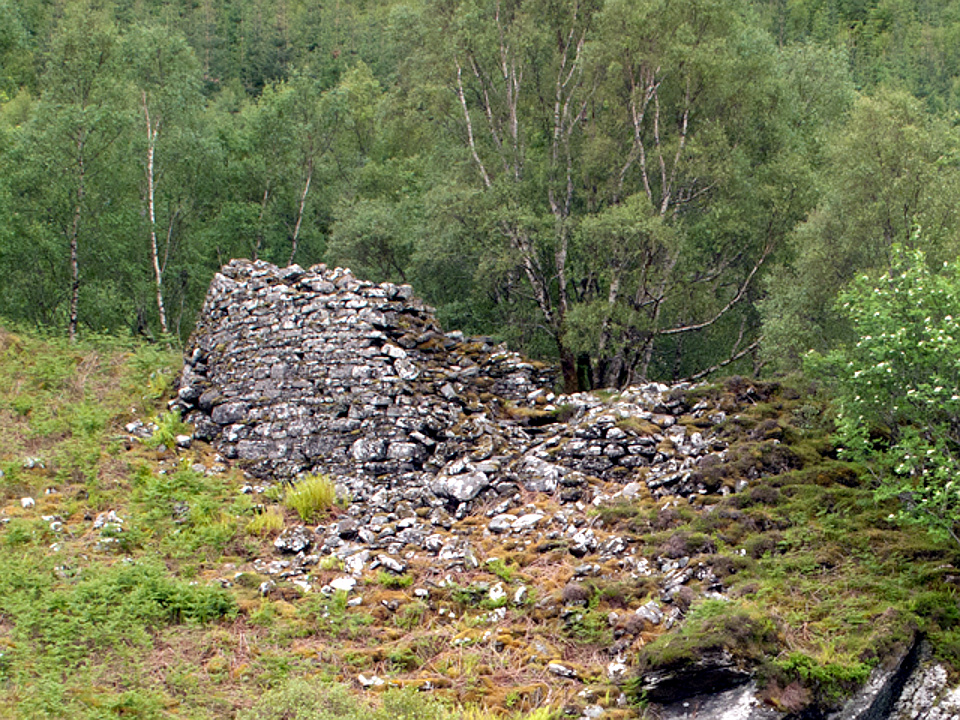
- Dun Grugaig viewed from the east

- Location within Highland
- 57.183555°N 5.556823°W
- Type: Broch
- Periods: Iron Age
- Location: Scottish Highlands

Dun Grugaig (or Caisteal Chonil) is a D-shaped dun, or "semi-broch", located about 7 kilometres southeast of the village of Glenelg, Highland, in Scotland (grid reference NG85141591).

== Location ==
Dun Grugaig stands on the north bank of the Abhainn a’Ghlaine Bhig, in the upper reaches of Gleann Beag. It is in the same valley as the two Glenelg brochs of Dun Telve and Dun Troddan. Unlike those two brochs which are in the valley close to flat ground, Dun Grugaig is situated on rugged rising ground.

It should not be confused with the broch known as Caisteal Grugaig a few miles to the north.

== Description ==
Dun Grugaig is a D-shaped fortification (dun) of a type commonly regarded as a prototype broch or "semi-broch". It was built with the straight side of the fort facing the edge of the precipice on the east. It measures about 17 by 12 metres. It has the hollow-wall construction which is characteristic of later brochs.

The partly lintelled southeast doorway appears to be the main entrance into the building; there is a second entrance at the west end of the wall. The interior is full of rubble. Three doorways can be seen in the inner wallface. Traces of an upper intramural gallery can be seen on the high wallhead on the south side.

== History ==
Dun Grugaig has not been excavated. The earliest record of the broch seems to be by Alexander Gordon in 1720 who refers to a 'Castle Chonil' in the east part of the glen and as being distinct from the other two brochs. The first modern survey was conducted by Henry Dryden in 1871.
