= Dun Carloway =

Ruin and archaeological site in Scotland

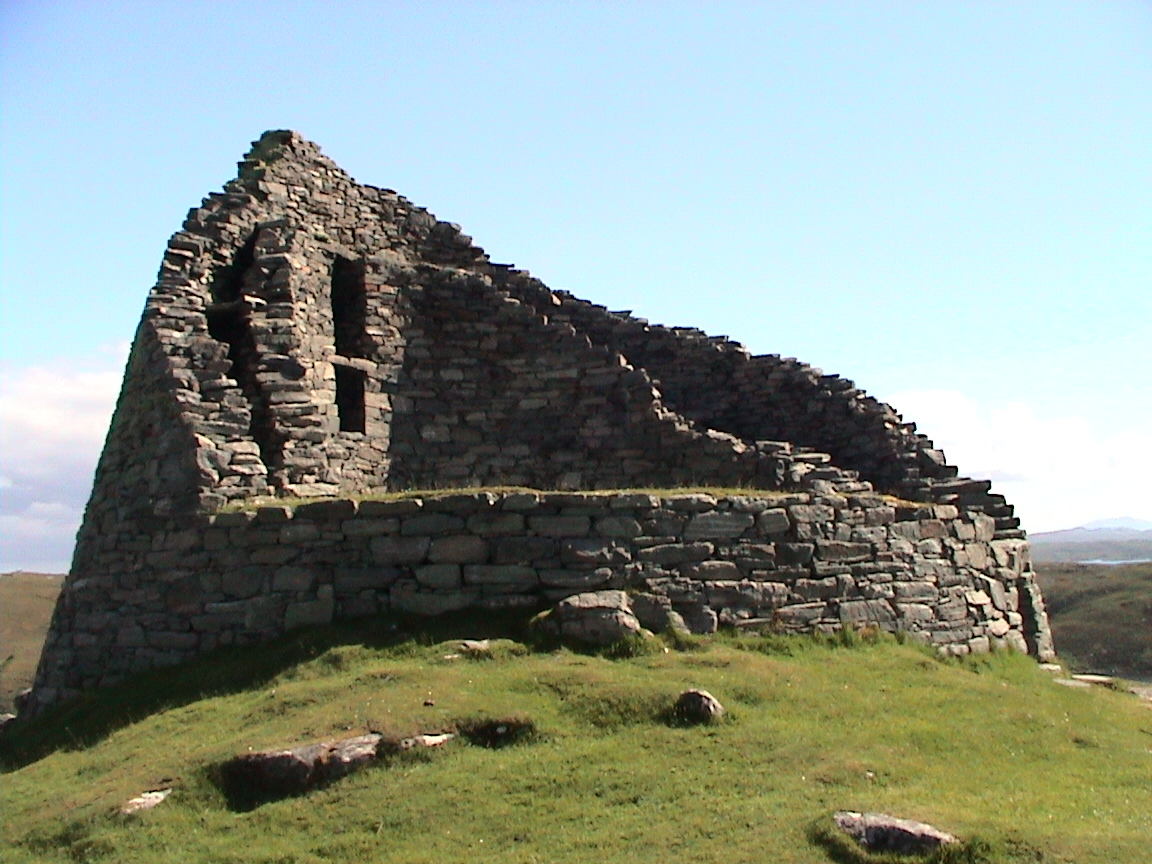
- Dun Carloway

- Location within Lewis Location within Outer Hebrides
- Interactive map of Dun Carloway
- 58°16′11″N 6°47′39″W
- Type: Broch
- Periods: Iron Age
- Location: Isle of Lewis

Site notes
- Owner: Historic Scotland
- Public access: Yes

Dun Carloway (Scottish Gaelic: Dùn Chàrlabhaigh) is a broch situated in the district of Carloway, on the west coast of the Isle of Lewis, Scotland (grid reference NB18994122). It is a remarkably well preserved broch – on the east side parts of the old wall still reach to 9 metres tall.

== Name and etymology ==
The broch known today as Dun Carloway takes its name from the Scottish Gaelic Dùn Chàrlabhaigh. The first element, dùn, simply means "fort" in Gaelic and is commonly used in Scotland for prehistoric or early historic fortified sites, including brochs.

The second element, Càrlabhaigh, refers to the district of Carloway on the west coast of the Isle of Lewis. The exact meaning of the name is uncertain, but most scholars connect it to Old Norse, reflecting the Norse settlement of the Hebrides between the 9th and 13th centuries.

A widely accepted interpretation links the name to the Old Norse personal name Karl together with vágr, meaning "bay" or "inlet". In that case the original sense would have been something like "Karl's bay" or "the bay of the free man". Over time this Norse name was adapted into Gaelic phonology as Càrlabhaigh.

The full Gaelic name Dùn Chàrlabhaigh therefore means "the fort of Carloway", referring to the broch overlooking the district and Loch Carloway.

The modern English form Dun Carloway is simply an Anglicised rendering of the Gaelic name. It became standard in antiquarian and archaeological writing during the nineteenth century as English became the dominant language of scholarly publication in Scotland.

== History ==
Most brochs were built in the period from 100 BC to 100 AD. Dun Carloway was probably built in the 1st century AD. It probably got its current name from the Norse Karlavagr ("Karl's bay"), a relic of its time as part of the Kingdom of the Isles. Through the centuries Dun Carloway remained in use until the floor level was too high due to build-up of the occupation layers.

The broch was occasionally used in later times as a stronghold. The Morrisons of Ness put Dun Carloway into use in 1601. The story goes that they had stolen cattle from the MacAuleys of Uig. The MacAuleys wanted their cattle back and found the Morrisons in the broch. One of them, Donald Cam MacAuley, climbed the outer wall using two daggers and managed to smoke out the inhabitants by throwing heather into the broch and then setting fire to it. The MacAuleys then destroyed the broch.

Presumably in the 16th century the walls of the broch were still largely intact. By the middle of the 19th century, a large portion of the top of the wall had disappeared, the stones being re-used in other buildings. The situation in 1861 is shown in a drawing published in 1890 by Captain Thomas. To prevent further decay Dun Carloway was in 1882 made one of the first officially protected monuments in Scotland. Five years later, the broch was placed under state management. Since then, restoration has been performed on the broch. At the beginning of the 20th century and in the 1970s there was limited archaeological excavation.

== Construction ==
Dun Carloway is built on a rock on a steep south slope at the height of 50 metres. It is the best preserved broch in the Outer Hebrides. The wall of the broch rises on the south side to 9.2 metres. Only Mousa Broch and Dun Telve have walls that are higher. The original height of Dun Carloway is unknown. The broch overlooks Loch Carloway.

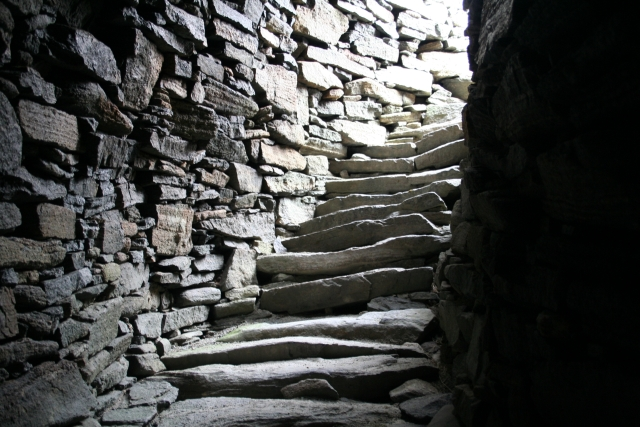
Steps inside the Broch

The external diameter is 14.3 metres; the internal diameter of the inner courtyard is 7.4 metres. The walls vary in thickness from 2.9 to 3.8 metres from the south-east to the north. The entrance is on the north-west side. The entrance is 75 centimetres wide and 1 metre high. The walls on this side of the broch do not much exceed the height of the entrance capstone and there are no stones on top of the large capstone. On the south side of the entrance-passage is a so-called "guard cell", a small side room in the hallway. The opening to the "guard cell" is 61 centimetres square. In the interior of the broch there are three additional openings. The opening on the eastern side, opposite the entrance, leads to the stairs located between the walls of the broch. The staircase runs along one quarter of the circumference of the broch. The north-eastern opening (to the left of the staircase opening) gives access to an oval room. Here are traces showing that there were at least three peat ovens over the centuries. The west opening (right, after entering the broch) provides access to a room under the staircase.

In the south-eastern wall two large wall voids are visible. On the north side of the interior protrudes the rock upon which the broch was built. It is likely that there was an upper wooden floor, as the scarcement (ledge) which could hold such a floor is visible 2 metres above ground level. Although the remaining wall is higher than nine metres, there is no trace of a higher scarcement found. This could mean that there was only one floor, or that a different method was used for higher floors.

== Finds ==
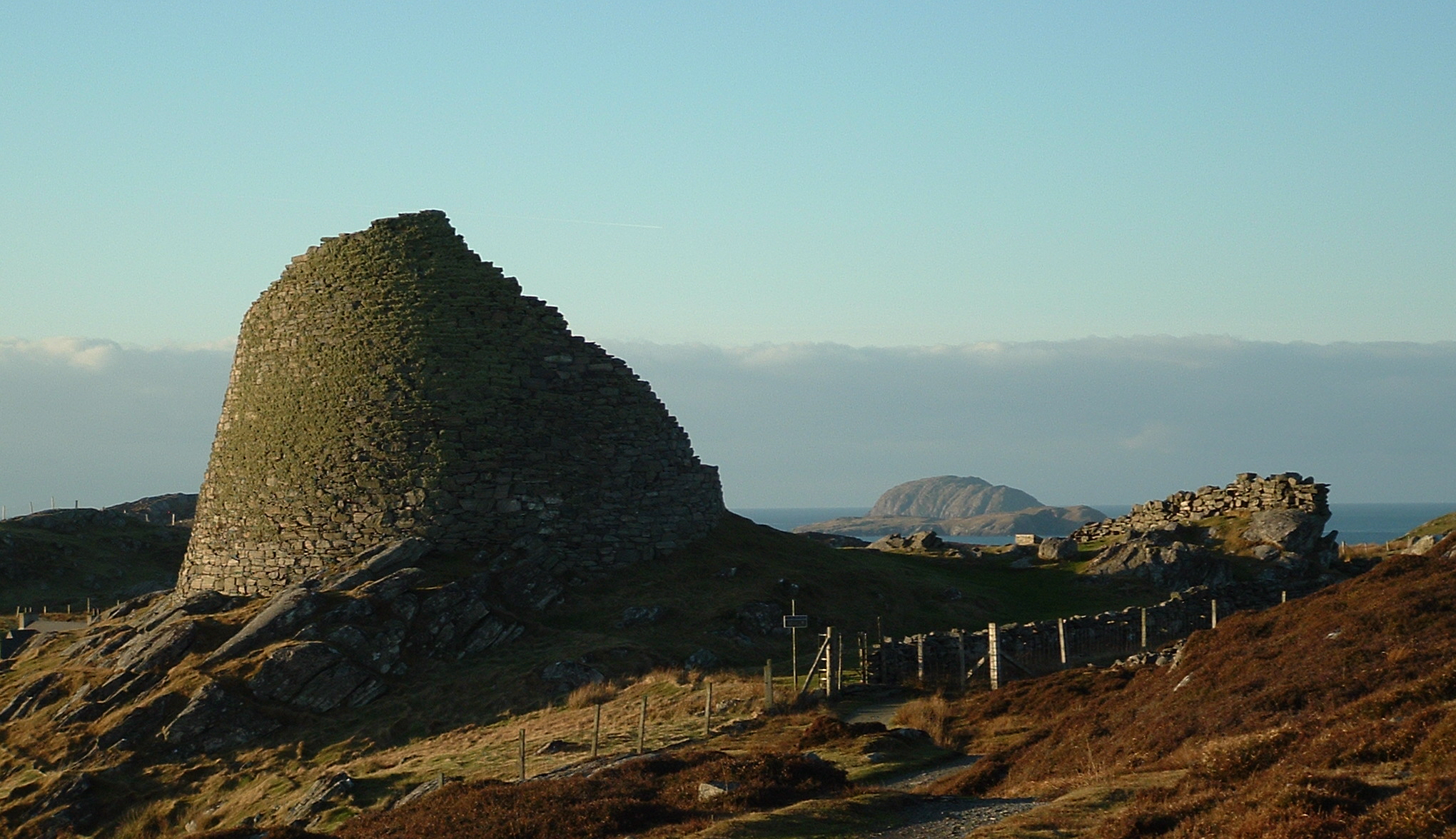
Photo of the broch

Excavation in the northeastern room found at least three peat-ovens used in the period 400–700. In this room were also a lot of pottery remains, as well as a fragment of a quern-stone and a collection of snail shells. The fireplaces contained no animal bones, which makes a domestic (preparing meals) use of the fires seem unlikely. A more industrial application is also unlikely because of the absence of tools that were used in making ironwork. Probably the northeastern room was only used for the manufacture of earthenware pots.

== Management ==
Dun Carloway has been in state management since 1887 and is now owned by Historic Scotland. The visitor centre is operated by Urras nan Tursachan (The Standing Stones Trust). Currently the community owned visitor centre is operated by the Carlaway Estate Trust (Urras Oighreachd Chàrlabhaigh) who are fundraising to maintain and develop the visitor centre.
