= John Romer =

John Romer may refer to:

- John Lambertus Romer (1680–1754), British military engineer
- John Romer (Egyptologist) (born 1941), British historian
- John Romer (politician), 19th century Governor of Bombay
