= Bernera Barracks =

- Glenelg
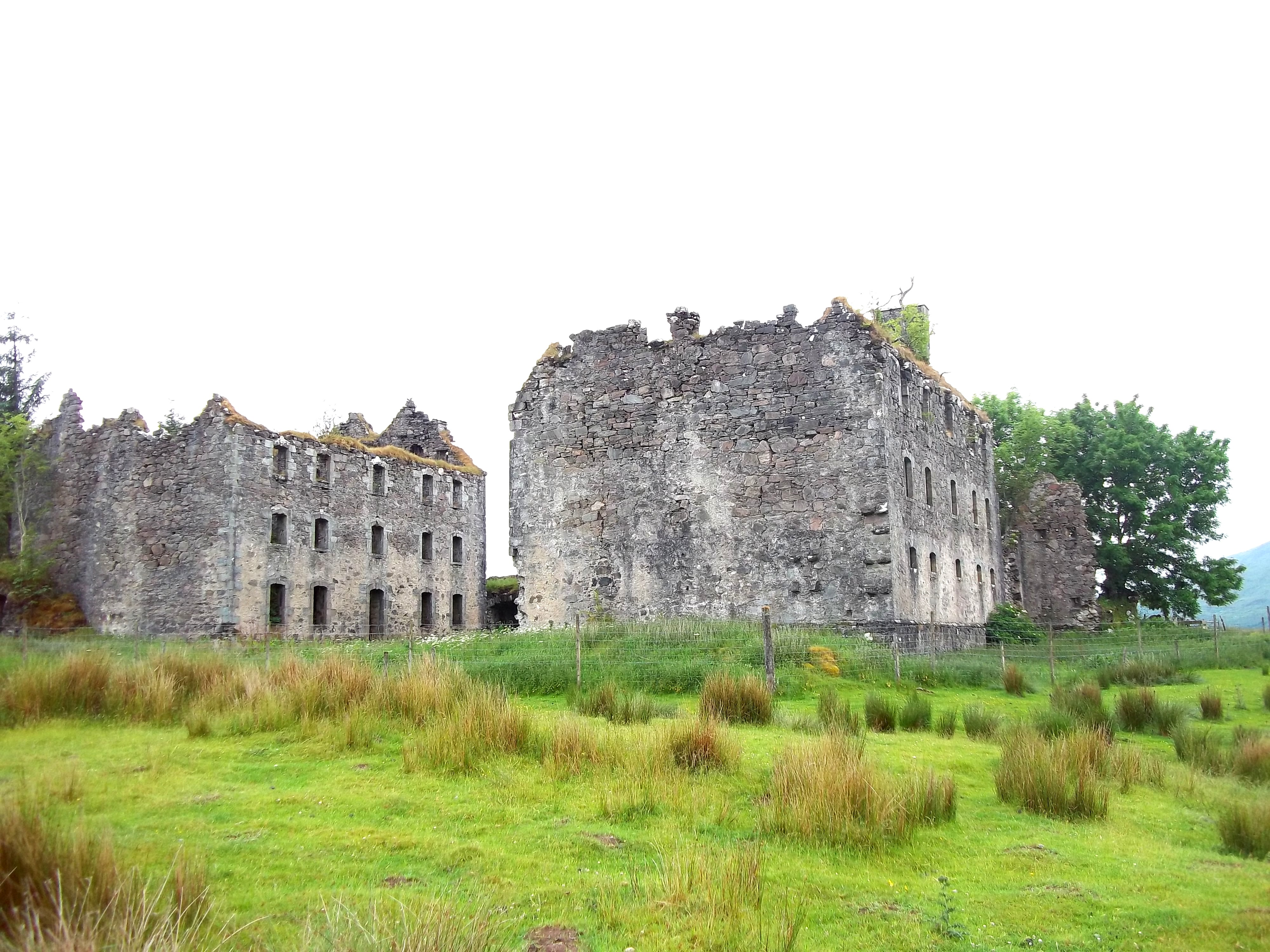
- Bernera Barracks

Site information
- Type: Barracks
- Operator: British Army

Location
- Location within Ross and Cromarty
- Coordinates: 57°12′58″N 05°37′12″W

Site history
- Built: 1717–1723
- In use: 1723-1797

Bernera Barracks is in Glenelg in the West Highlands of Scotland. The barracks were constructed between 1717 and 1723 as part of a campaign by the British government to subdue the local population which had risen up in arms in the Jacobite Rising of 1715, and which would do so again in 1745. The barracks were designed by Andrews Jelfe and John Lambertus Romer of the Board of Ordnance, or possibly their predecessor James Smith, and built by Sir Patrick Strachan. Some of the stone used in the construction was taken from Dun Telve and Dun Troddan, nearby iron-age brochs. The Government troops who were garrisoned here during the Jacobite uprisings were also intended to control the crossing to Skye. Following the 1715 rising, Glenelg was chosen along with Fort George, Fort Augustus and Fort William as one of four sites in the Highlands for military barracks.

The barracks (and indeed the broch) are now in ruins, a state which they appear to have entered shortly after the withdrawal of troops in 1797. The barracks is protected as a scheduled monument.

Major William Caulfeild engineered the military road from Fort Augustus to Bernera Barracks in 1755 but Thomas Telford’s commissioners remade it in the 1820s. It initially headed west through Inchnacardoch Forest climbing to a height of over 1,280 feet (390 m) before dropping into Glen Moriston. It appears to have crossed the River Moriston somewhere near the confluence of the River Doe with the Moriston, and then taken a route somewhat to the north of the present day A887 road and A87 road north of Loch Cluanie. The road descended Glen Shiel to Ratagan before rising over the Bealach Ratagain (Ratagan Pass) and into Glen More and thence to the barracks.
