= Glenelg Inn =

Pub in Glenelg, Scotland

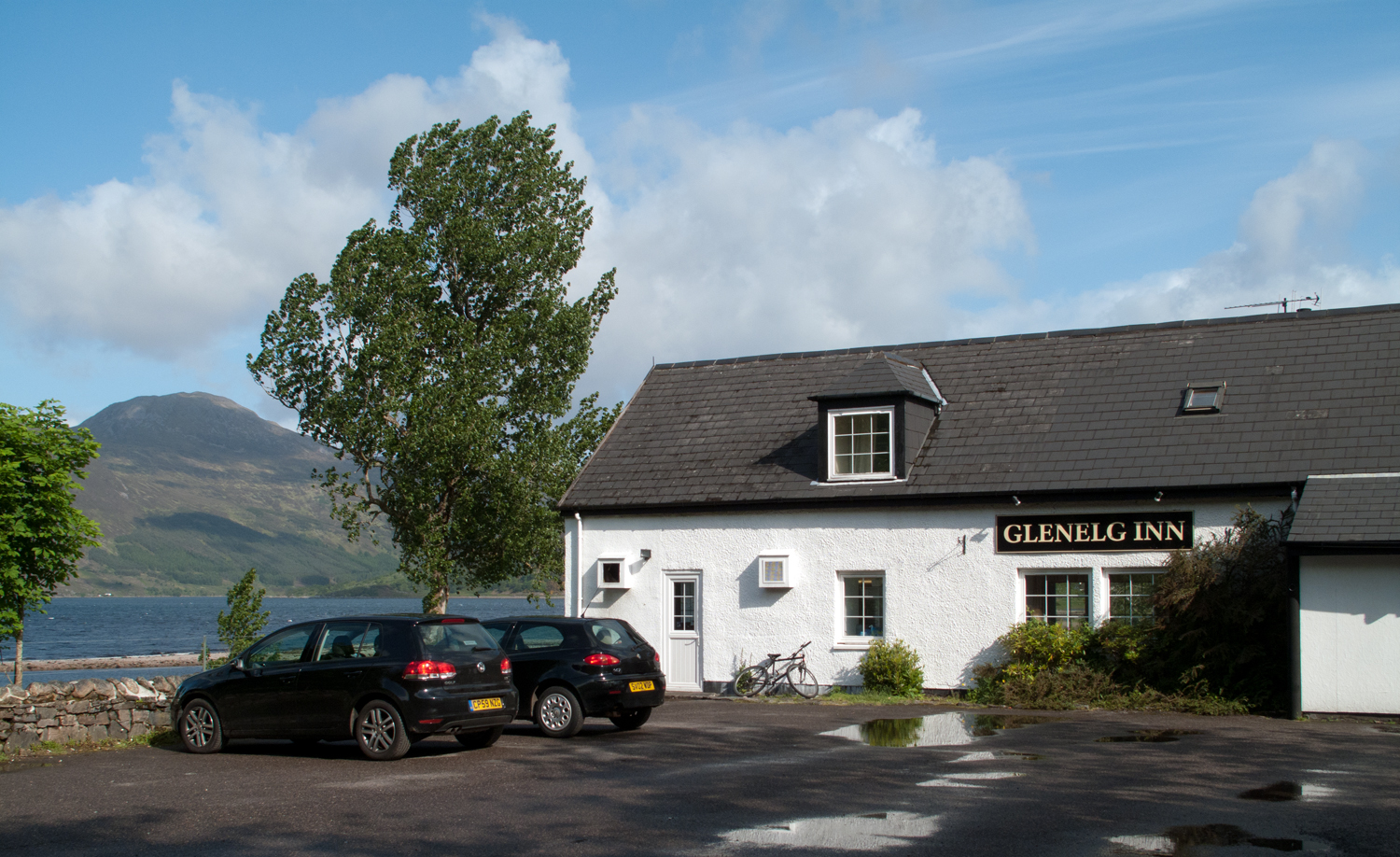
- A 2011 view, looking northwest to Sgùrr na Coinnich on the Isle of Skye
- Interactive map of the Glenelg Inn area

General information
- Type: Public house and inn
- Location: Glenelg, Highland, Scotland
- Coordinates: 57.212428°N 5.622669°W

Technical details
- Floor count: 2

Website
- www.glenelg-inn.com

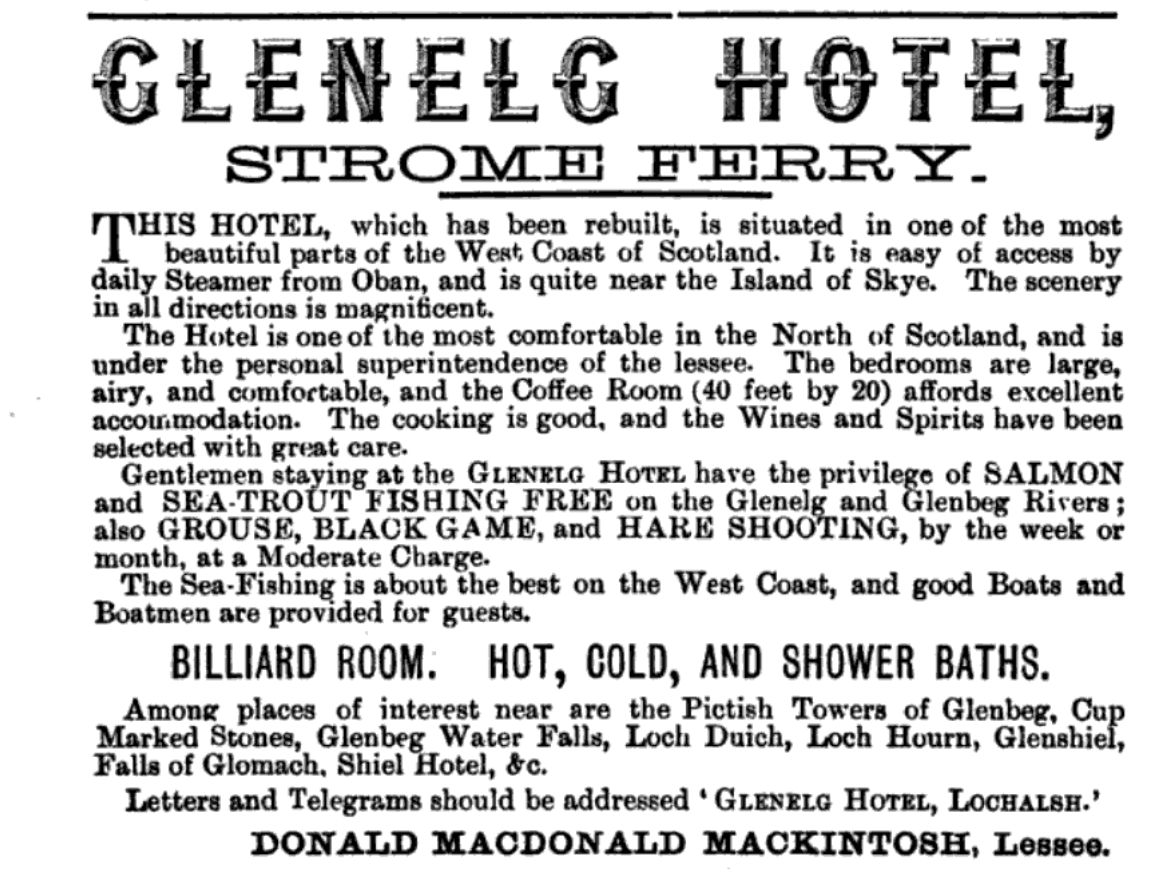
An 1893 advertisement for the Glenelg Hotel inside Mackenzie's Guide to Inverness. The property's lessee at the time was Donald Macdonald Mackintosh

Glenelg Inn is a public house and inn in the village of Glenelg in the Highlands of Scotland. The current building dates to the second half of the 20th century, but remnants of the previous structure — the "imposing" Glenelg Hotel (itself a rebuild), which was largely destroyed in a 1947 fire — still stand.

Early lessees of the property include George Chaffey (around 1870) and Donald Macdonald Mackintosh (around 1893).

Christopher Main was the owner between 1985 and 2007.

It is believed that Dr. Samuel Johnson and James Boswell stayed here on their visit to the area in the 18th century.

The inn was listed in the 2017 and 2018 editions of The Good Pub Guide.

The rear of the property stands on an inlet of the strait of Kyle Rhea.
