= Dun Hallin =

Iron Age broch in Scotland

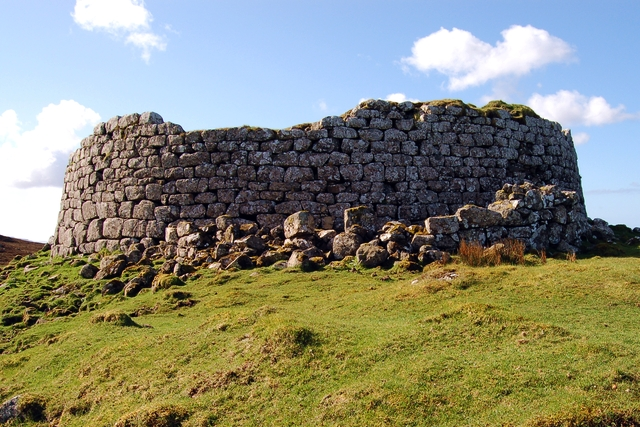
- North side of Dun Hallin

- Location within Isle of Skye
- 57°32′24″N 6°35′10″W
- Type: Broch
- Periods: Iron Age
- Location: Skye

Dun Hallin is an Iron Age broch located near the northwest coast of the island of Skye, in Scotland (grid reference NG25665927).

== Location ==
Dun Hallin is located on the Waternish peninsula of Skye, just east of the settlement of Hallin. It occupies the southeast end of a steep-sided rocky plateau overlooking a fertile valley and the sea.

== Description ==
Dun Hallin has an external diameter of around 17.4 metres and an internal diameter of around 10.5 metres. The broch walls currently stand to a maximum height of 3.8 metres on the north and west sides. The entrance is on the southeast side but is in a ruined state. On each side of the entrance passage are oval guard cells, although only the northern, right-hand cell can easily be seen. The interior of the broch has much rubble grassed over. A mural gallery is visible on the southwest side and a lintel stone remains in position over the doorway there. Six steps of the intra-mural stairway were found when the broch was examined in 1921 but are not now apparent.

The broch is additionally defended by an outer stone wall which runs round the edge of the rocky knoll and which is still about 6 metres high to the south.

The broch has not been excavated.

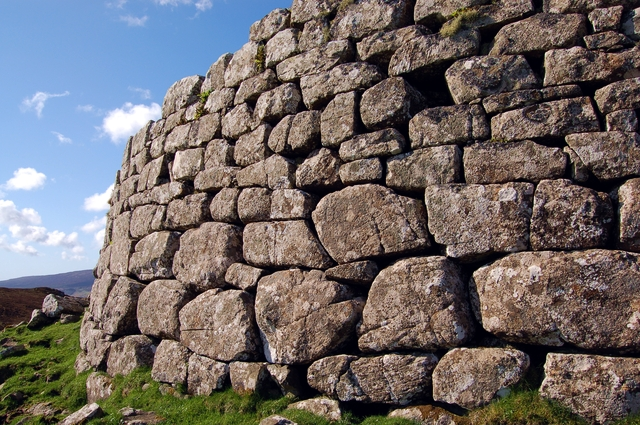
Detail of the wall
