= Broch of Culswick =

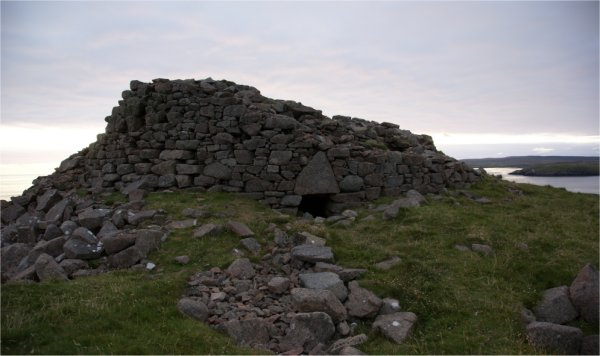
- Broch of Culswick

- Location within Shetland
- 60°11′13″N 1°32′39″W
- Type: Broch
- Periods: Iron Age
- Location: Mainland, Shetland

The Broch of Culswick (also Culswick Broch) is an unexcavated coastal broch in the Shetland Islands of Scotland (grid reference HU25384481). It has good views all around, including Foula and Vaila isles, and Fitful Head and Fair Isle in the south. The broch stands on the top of a rock platform and is about 3 metres high at its tallest point. Much rubble has fallen into the centre. This broch has a massive triangular lintel stone over the entrance, which is partly filled with rubble. Drawings by Low in 1774 and Skene in 1805 reveal that the structure survived very well up to those dates.

== Location ==
The Broch of Culswick is located a kilometre west of Culswick in the parish of Sandsting. It is on top of a steep, smooth knoll near cliffs and the sea.

== Description ==
The Broch of Culswick has an external diameter of around 16 metres with walls preserved up to a height of 3.5 metres. The main entrance is clearly visible but debris nearly fills the passage. The lintel is a massive triangular stone. A "guard cell" was visible to the right of the main entrance. The interior of the broch is full of debris. The inside face of an upper gallery can be seen above the entrance, and another void or doorway is visible in the inner wall face.

Culswick Broch was better preserved in 1774 when George Low's drawing shows three complete intramural galleries preserved on top of the buried lower storey as well as a scarcement ledge on the inside face.
