= Wolfgang William Romer =

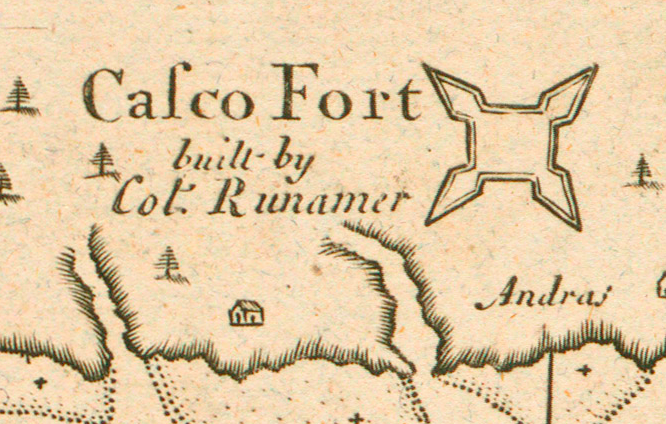
Fort Casco, Portland, Maine built by Wolfgang William Romer; map by Cyprian Southack

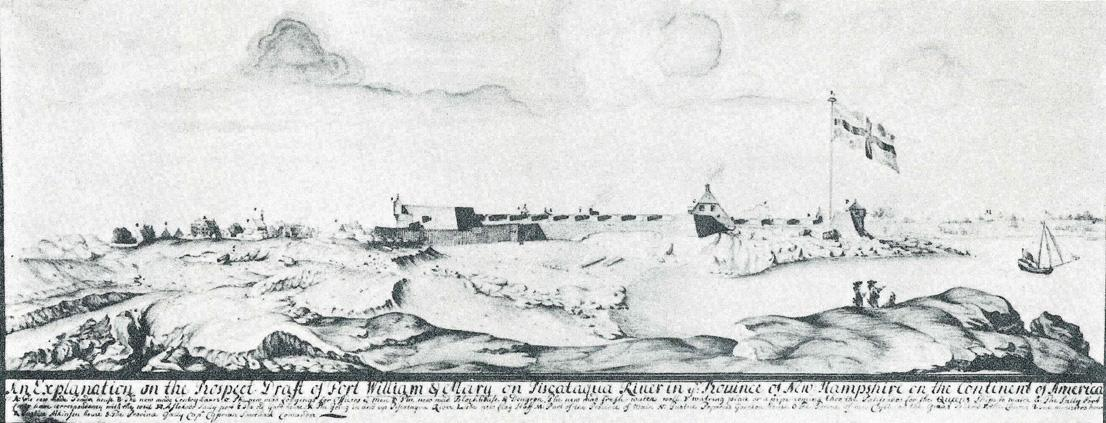
Fort William and Mary, Portsmouth, New Hampshire by Wolfgang William Romer (1705)

Wolfgang William Romer (23 April 1640 – 15 March 1713) was a Dutch military engineer, born at The Hague.

== Early life ==
He was the third son, in a family of six sons and five daughters, of Mathias Romer of Düsseldorf and Anna Duppengiezeer. Mathias was ambassador to Holland from the Elector Palatine, who stood godfather to Wolfgang at his baptism on 17 May 1640.

== Military career ==
Romer entered the service of William of Orange as a military engineer. In 1688, Romer was a colonel in the army of Prince William which landed in England in 1688, during the "Glorious Revolution". By the end of the year, King James II had fled, and William of Orange was proclaimed King of England in February 1689.

By a royal warrant of 13 May 1690, Romer was appointed engineer in Ireland at 20 shillings a day, to commence from 1 March 1689. He took part in the campaigns of 1690 and 1691, and was employed on the fortifications of Cork, Longford, and Thurles. He remained in Ireland until 1692, when he was appointed by royal warrant of 7 July, chief engineer of the artillery train fitted out at St. Helen's for the expedition against the coast of France. On 26 July he embarked with fourteen thousand troops in transports, and joined the fleet at Portland, when the expedition was abandoned. In 1693, he was chief engineer of the ordnance train of the expedition to the Mediterranean; he served under Richard Coote, 1st Earl of Bellomont, and embarked in the fleet under Delaval, Killigrew, and Rooke, to convoy the so-called Smyrna fleet. On 8 May 1694, he was directed by royal warrant to report on the defences of Guernsey, and to lay out any additional works which were urgent. A plan of Castle Cornet, drawn by Romer when on this duty, is in the British Museum.

== Career in the Americas ==
At the beginning of 1697, Romer was ordered to New York, but objected to go on the proposed salary of 20 shillings a day. The Board of Ordnance recommended that his warrant should be cancelled, and that he should be discharged from the King's service. The King was, however, well acquainted with his value, and although the board had suspended him in February, in August the suspension was removed, and Romer accompanied Lord Bellomont, the newly appointed governor, to New York as chief engineer and with pay of 30 shillings a day. Bellamont had so high an opinion of Romer that he was specially allowed to retain his services beyond the term arranged.

Romer made a plan of the Hudson River, New York, and the adjoining country. In 1700, he explored the territories of the Iroquois Confederacy, who were allied with the British, and made a map of his journey among them. From 1701 to 1703, he was engaged in fortifying Boston Harbour. He built Castle William, mounting one hundred guns, on Castle Island. It was destroyed on 17 March 1776, when the British evacuated Boston. Many years afterwards, a slate slab with a Latin inscription was found among the ruins, giving the dates when the work was commenced and finished, and stating that it was constructed by Romer, "a military architect of the first rank." Romer constructed defensive posts and forts in the Iroquois territories, and many of them were executed at his own expense, for which he was never reimbursed. He was a member of the Council of New York Province, and his knowledge of the colony, and especially of the Iroquois, was valuable to Lord Bellomont and to his successor Lord Cornbury, who succeeded to the governorship in 1702.

In 1703, Romer, who was suffering from "a distemper not curable in those parts for want of experienced surgeons", applied to return to England. The Board of Ordnance instead ordered him to go to Barbados, and it was only on the intervention of the Council of Trade, who represented his services, that on 14 August 1704 he was ordered home as soon as he should be relieved. He remained in America until 1706. He completed the plans of Castle Island, Boston Bay, which are now in the British Museum.

== Return home and later life ==
On his homeward voyage he was captured by the French and carried to St. Malo, where he was liberated on parole. The usual offer of twenty seamen in exchange for a colonel was refused by the French, and Romer returned to England to negotiate for an exchange. The Board of Ordnance suggested that the French might accept the Marquis de Levy, taken in HMS Salisbury, or Chevalier Nangis.

In September 1707 Romer visited Düsseldorf, carrying a letter of recommendation from Queen Anne to the Elector Palatine. In 1708, his exchange having been effected, he was employed in designing defences for Portsmouth, which were submitted to the Board of Ordnance in the following year, and in the construction of Blockhouse Fort at the entrance of Portsmouth Harbour. He continued in charge of the Portsmouth defences, occasionally visiting other fortified towns, such as Harwich, which he reported on in 1710, and places in Flanders, until his death in 1713. He was buried at Düsseldorf, where he had some property. His son John Lambertus Romer (1680–1754) followed him into a career as a military engineer, and served in Scotland.
