= Broch of Mousa =

Tallest preserved example of an Iron Age broch or round tower

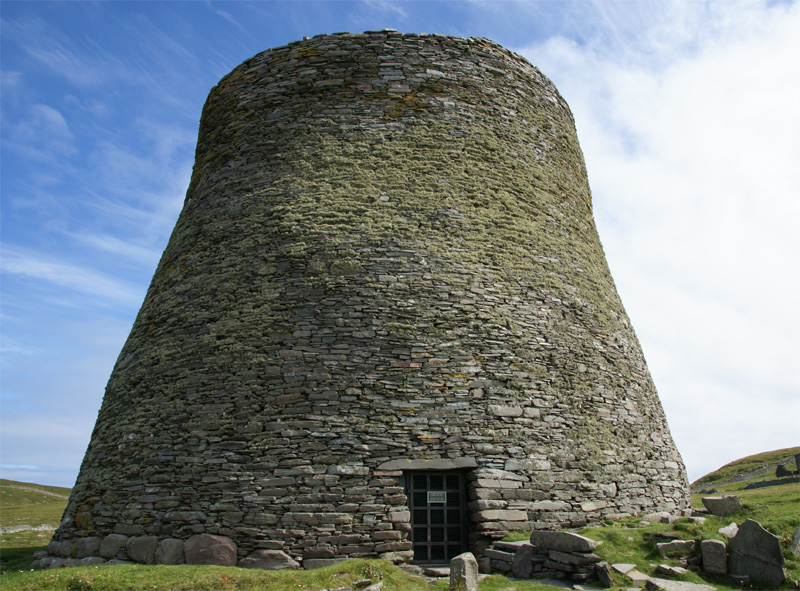
- Mousa Broch exterior

- Location within Shetland
- Interactive map of Broch of Mousa
- 59°59′43″N 1°10′55″W
- Type: Broch
- Periods: Iron Age
- Location: Mousa, Shetland

Site notes
- Owner: Historic Environment Scotland

Broch of Mousa or Mousa Broch (Shaetlan pronunciation: [ˌmusə ˈbrɒx] MOOSE-ə BRAWKH) is a preserved Iron Age broch or round tower. It is on the island of Mousa in Shetland, Scotland. It is the tallest broch still standing and amongst the best-preserved prehistoric buildings in Europe. It is thought to have been constructed c. 300 BC, and is one of more than 500 brochs built in Scotland. The site is managed by Historic Environment Scotland as a scheduled monument.

== Location and landscape ==
The Broch of Mousa stands on the western shore of the island of Mousa in the Shetland Islands, overlooking Mousa Sound, the narrow stretch of water separating the island from the South Mainland of Shetland. It is accessible by boat from Sandwick, Shetland, 14 miles (23 kilometres) south of Lerwick.

Mousa Sound forms part of a network of sheltered waterways that historically connected communities across the Shetland Islands, where travel between settlements was often easier by sea than over land.

The broch is built on a flat rock surface at the end of a low coastal promontory close to the shoreline. Mousa is a small, treeless island of open grassland and heath typical of the Shetland landscape. Its rocky coastline includes small natural inlets that provide landing places for boats. Immediately beside the broch lies the sheltered tidal basin known as the Loch of Mousa, which connects to the sea through a narrow channel. Such sheltered landing places were important in Shetland, where small boats played a central role in transport, fishing, and communication between communities.

From its position near the shore, the broch commands wide views across Mousa Sound toward the South Mainland. The open terrain offers little obstruction to visibility, allowing activity on the surrounding waters to be seen from a considerable distance. From the upper levels of the tower, much of the sound and nearby coastline would have been visible, allowing those within the broch to observe boats approaching the island or travelling along nearby sea routes.

The location may have been chosen for both practical and strategic reasons. The nearby lagoon provided sheltered landing places and access to marine resources, while the position overlooking the sound offered clear views of maritime traffic between the islands. The surrounding land would also have provided pasture for livestock and space for associated settlement and field systems. The conspicuous height of the tower and its position beside a natural landing place would have made the structure a prominent landmark for travellers moving through Mousa Sound. The broch also stands within a wider landscape rich in Iron Age archaeology, as numerous brochs and settlements are recorded across the Shetland Islands.

== Description ==
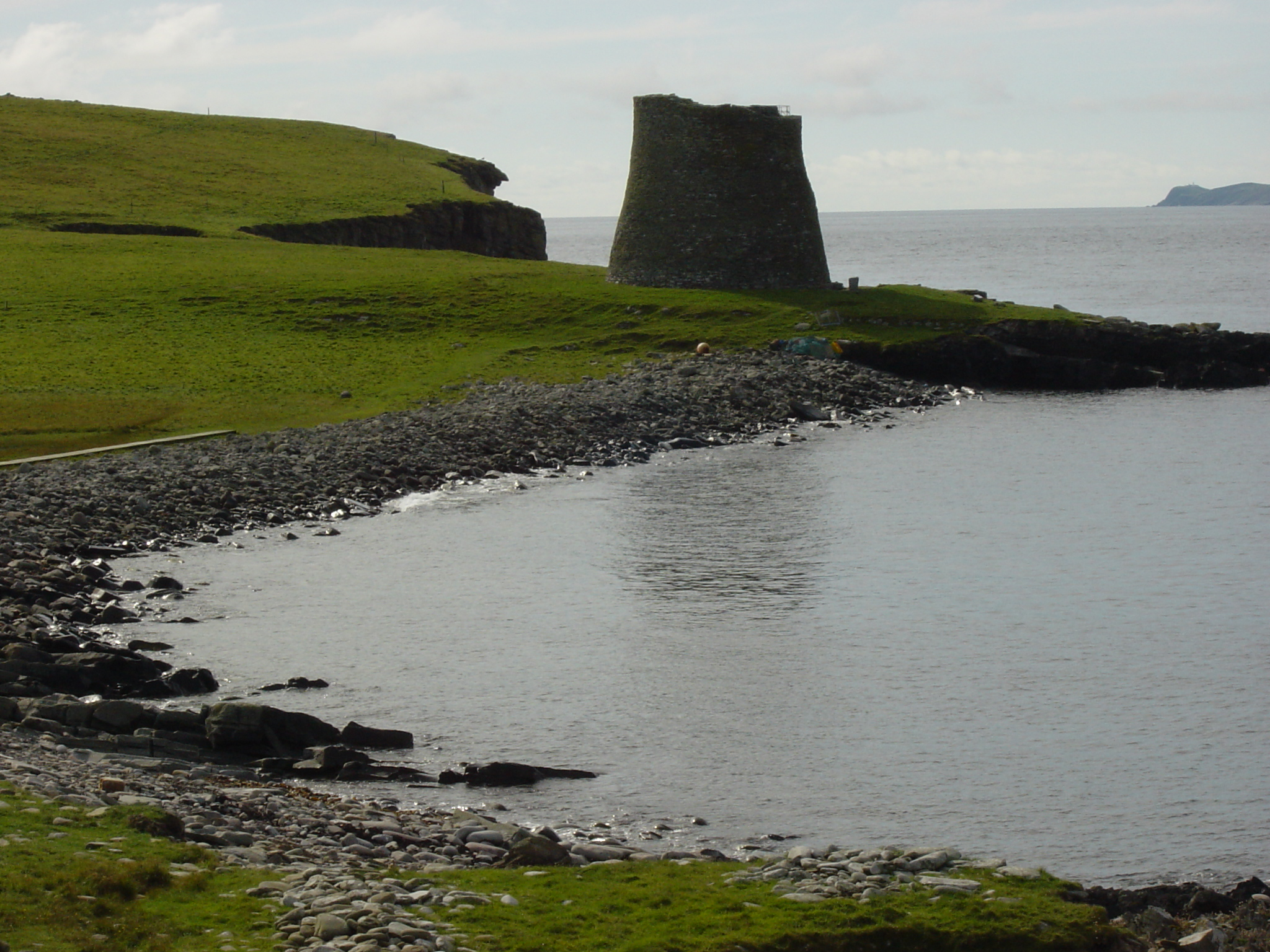
Shoreside location of Mousa Broch

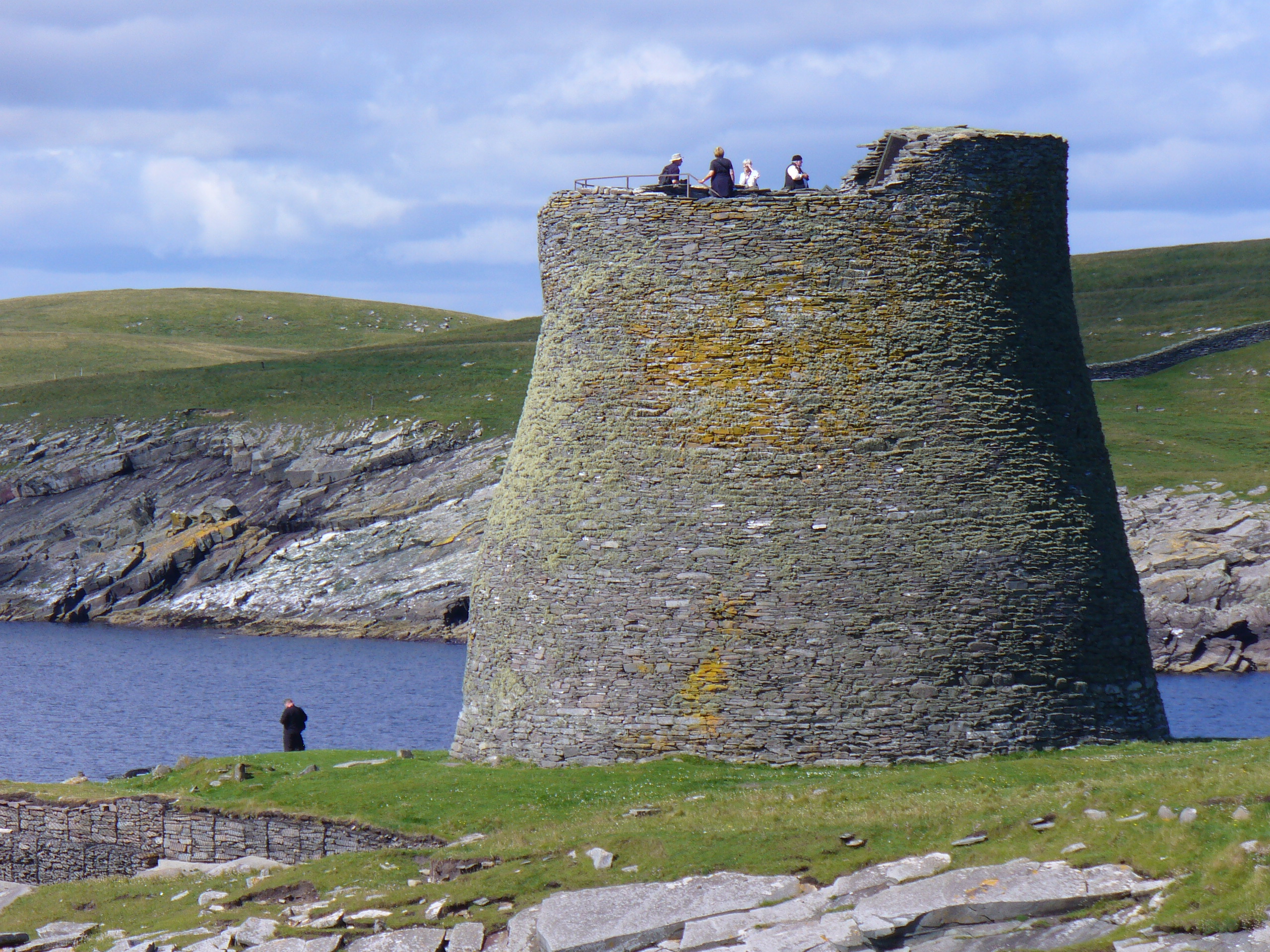
Mousa Broch

Mousa Broch has one of the smallest overall diameters of any broch, as well as one of the thickest wall bases and smallest interiors; this massive construction (as well as its remote location) is likely to be the main explanation for its excellent state of preservation. It stands 13.3 metres (44 ft) high and is accessible via a single entrance at ground level. Once inside, a visitor may ascend an internal staircase to the top. It is the only broch which is complete nearly to the top, including the original intramural stair. It is built of dry stone with no mortar. The entrance is on the west side but has been altered at various times from its original appearance. The entrance passage is 5 metres (16 ft) long and still has an original bar-hole.

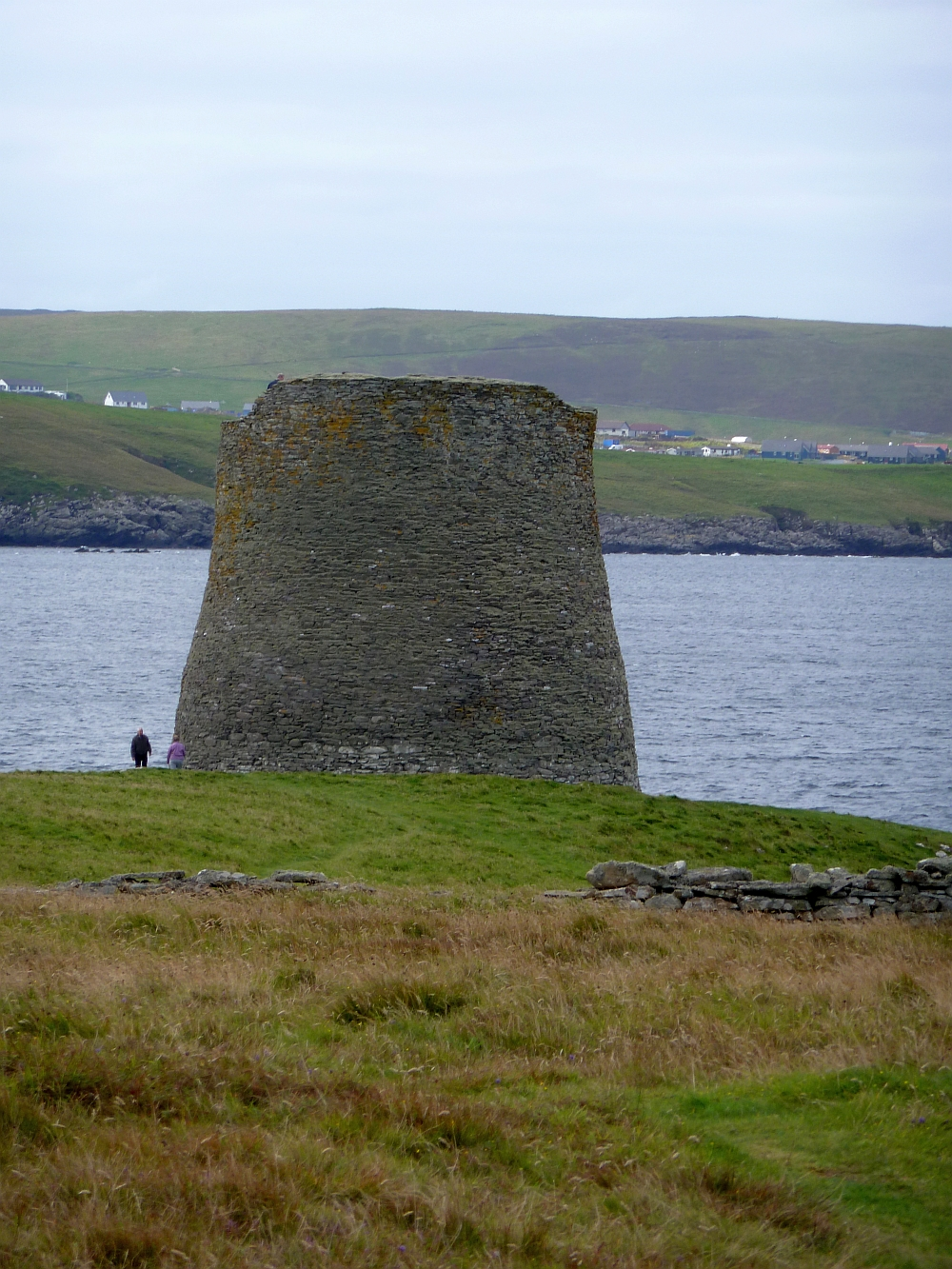
View from the east

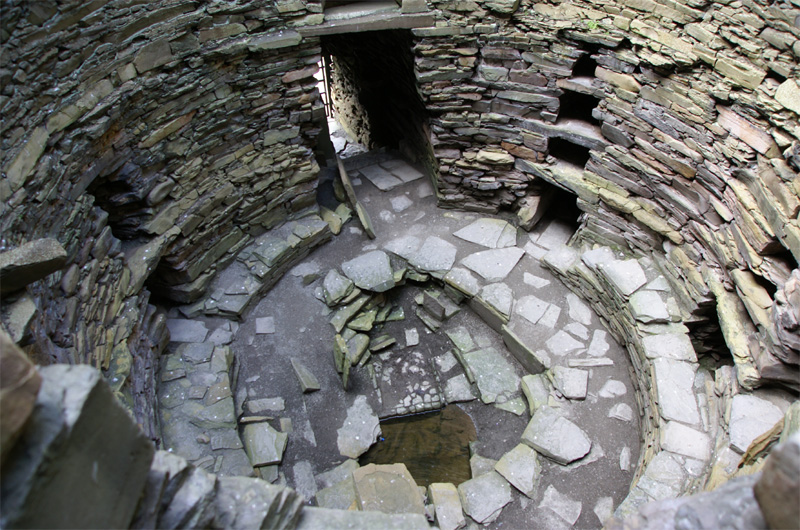
Mousa Broch interior

Inside a hearth and floor tank can be seen in the central space. There is a low stone bench around the base of the inside wall, which was part of an early alteration to the interior. The broch went through at least two phases of occupation. In its original condition it may or may not have contained a wooden roundhouse resting on the scarcement ledges and presumably on a ring of posts set into the primary floor. (It has recently been argued that the scarcements may have supported scaffolding in a roofless building.) At a later date, if the wooden building existed, it was demolished to make way for a small wheelhouse (with three projecting stone piers) in the interior. Scarcement ledges at heights of 2.1 and 3.7 metres (6.9 and 12.1 ft) might have supported the putative timber building. The other main feature of the ground floor is the three large cells within the walls. They are entered via thresholds which are 0.7 metres (2.3 ft) above the floor level. Above the lintel of each cell door are further openings which seem designed to let light and air into the chamber behind. The cells all have recesses, or large cupboards, set into the thickness of the wall.

Above the solid base of the broch are six galleries. They are formed by the space between the two concentric walls of the upper part of the broch, and are partly lit by voids. It is possible to walk along most of the galleries. They were probably used by the builders as an aid to constructing the building, rather than for accommodation or storage.

The stair, which begins at the second level, is reached by a doorway in the inner wall face, which has an adjacent cell. There is also an upper cell above the entrance passage.

It is the tallest broch still standing and amongst the best-preserved prehistoric buildings in Europe.

== Later history ==
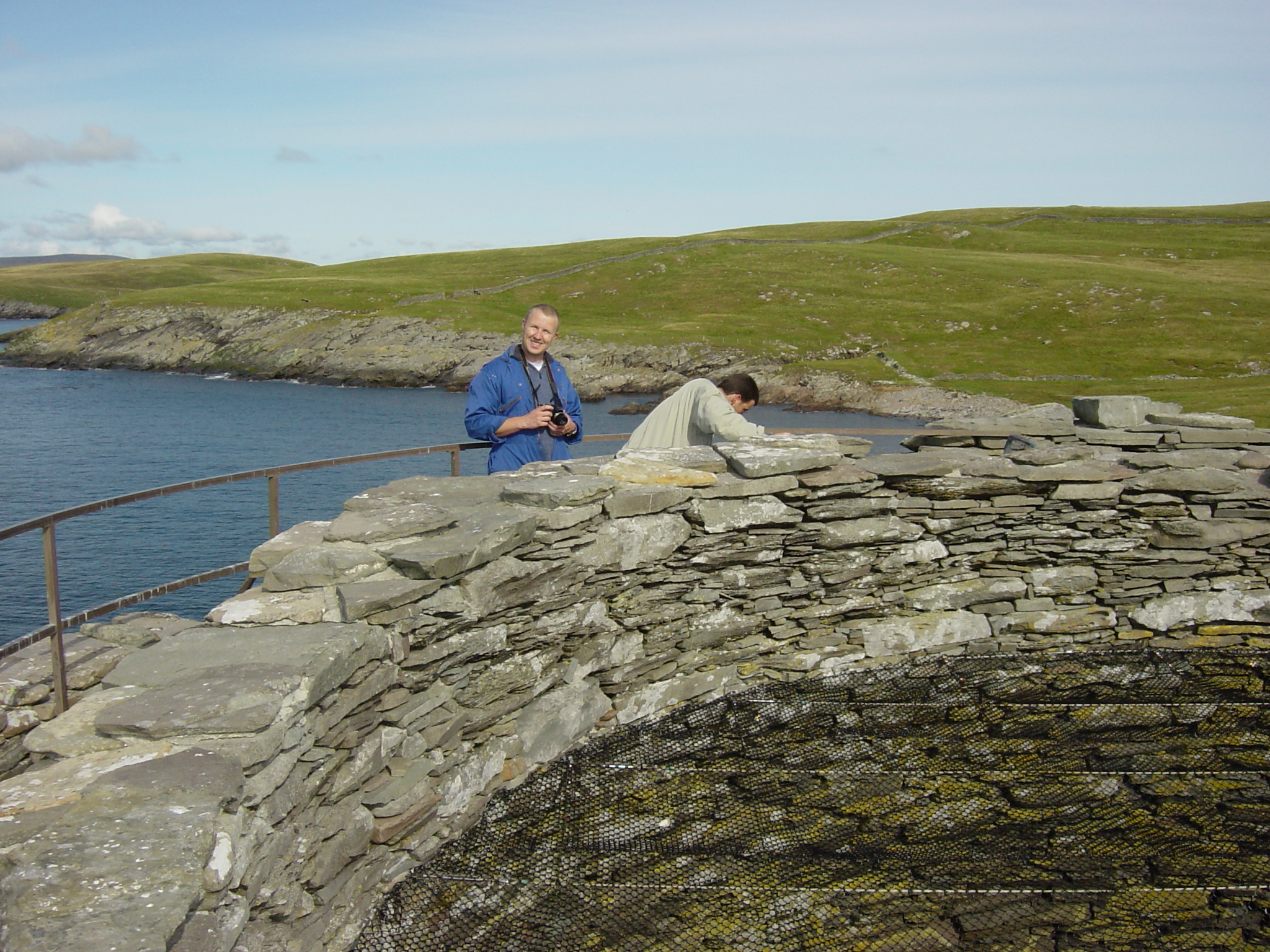
Incomplete topmost gallery of Mousa Broch

Mousa Broch continued to be used over the centuries and is mentioned in two Norse Sagas. Egil's Saga tells of a couple eloping from Norway to Iceland who were shipwrecked and used the broch as a temporary refuge. The Orkneyinga Saga gives an account of a siege of the broch by Earl Harald Maddadsson in 1153 following the abduction of his mother, who was held inside the broch.

The site was visited by the antiquarian George Low during his tour of 1774, and he provided the first drawings of the broch. It was visited by Sir Walter Scott in 1814, who described it as "a Pictish fortress, the most entire probably in the world." The geologist and antiquarian Samuel Hibbert visited it in 1818 and provided a detailed account of the site. The first accurate survey was conducted by Sir Henry Dryden in 1852 and 1866.

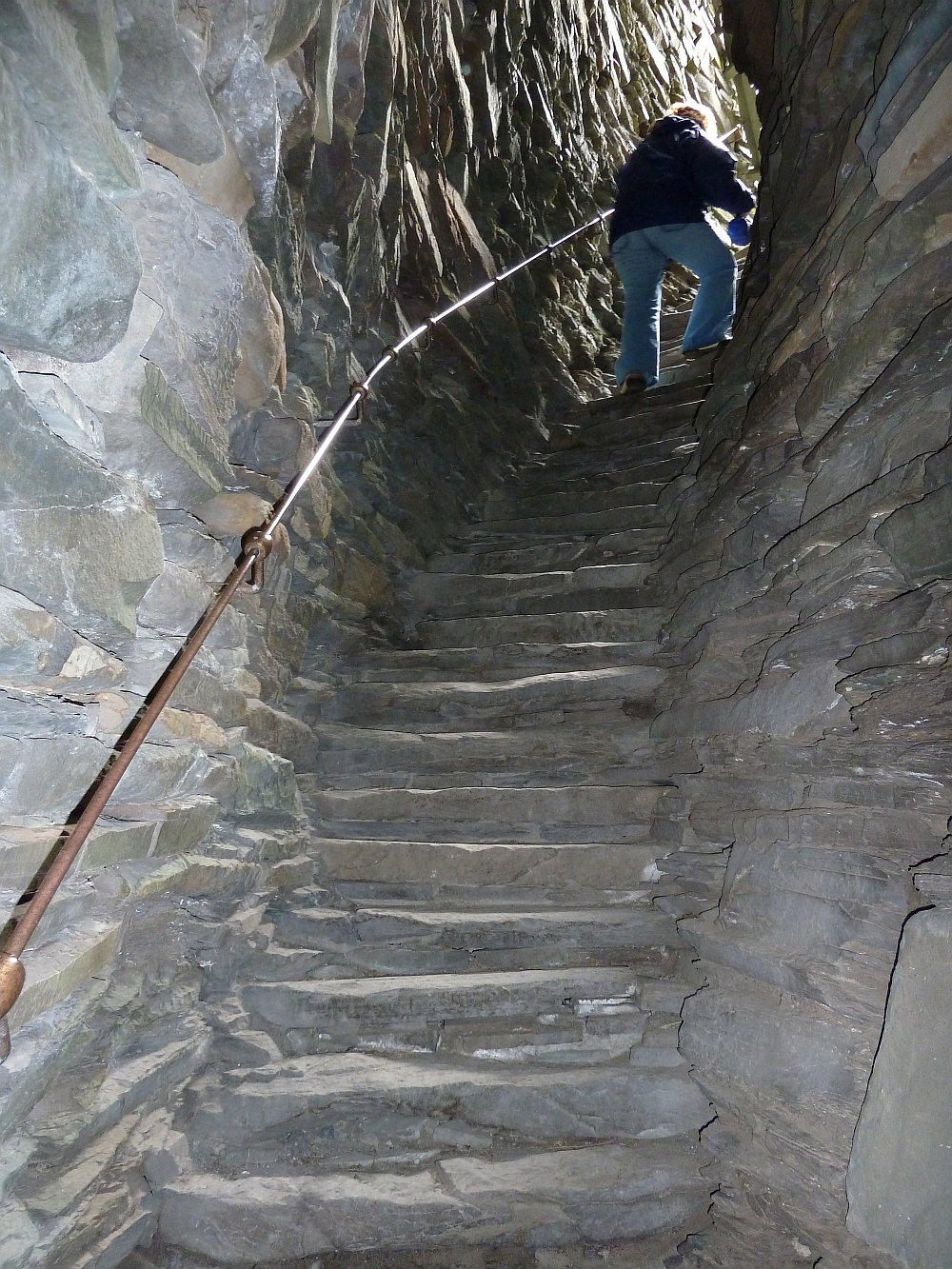
Interior staircase

== Archaeology and discoveries ==
Because the Broch of Mousa survives almost completely intact, archaeological investigation has focused less on large-scale excavation than on documenting the architecture and history of the standing structure. Built around c. 300 BCE during the later Scottish Iron Age, the tower remained standing for centuries, and much of the archaeological material that might otherwise accumulate within a collapsed ruin was removed during later reuse and nineteenth-century clearing.

The interior was first cleared of accumulated rubble in 1861, more than two thousand years after the broch was built. Excavators recovered large quantities of animal bones, particularly those of otters, which had likely inhabited the abandoned structure, along with fragments of pottery vessels, stone pot lids, and a slaty stone object described as resembling a triangular file. One of the most unusual discoveries was a carved wooden model of a Norwegian boat, about 0.9 metres (3.0 ft) long and made from fir.

Further clearing was carried out in 1919 by the Office of Works, though relatively few additional artefacts were recovered. Some pottery sherds, including part of a Black-burnished ware vessel, are now held in the National Museum of Scotland.

Although artefactual evidence from the site is limited, the architecture of the broch itself provides important archaeological evidence. Within the central court are a hearth, a stone floor tank, and a low stone bench running around the inner wall, indicating domestic activity during at least one phase of occupation. The tower walls also contain three ground-floor cells built into their thickness, entered through raised thresholds about 0.7 metres (2.3 ft) above the floor and fitted with recesses that may have served for storage.

Evidence indicates the broch was modified during the Iron Age. In its earliest phase the structure may have contained a timber roundhouse supported by posts and resting on scarcement ledges built into the inner wall at heights of about 2.1 and 3.7 metres (6.9 and 12.1 ft). This was later replaced by a wheelhouse-like arrangement with stone piers projecting into the central space.

Modern archaeological work has focused mainly on recording and conservation rather than excavation. Major stabilisation was undertaken between 1967 and the 1980s, and in 2005 archaeologists used 3D laser scanning to document the structure and support conservation planning.

== Storm petrels ==
Mousa Broch is well known among birders for its breeding European storm petrels, which are best seen after dark on partly or on completely overcast summer nights. The island holds around 6,800 breeding pairs in total, representing about 8% of the British population and about 2.6% of the world population. Some of these birds nest in burrows within the broch itself.

== See also ==
- Oldest buildings in Scotland
