= John Lambertus Romer =

British army officer

- Captain John Romer, c. 1710
- Born: 1680
- Died: 1754 (aged 73–74)
- Military career
- Allegiance: Great Britain
- Service: British Army: Royal Engineers
- Service years: 1708–1751
- Rank: Captain
- Conflicts: Jacobite rising; Battle of Culloden (WIA)

John Lambertus Romer (1680 – 1754) was a British military engineer. He was the son of Wolfgang William Romer, a Dutch engineer who came to England with William of Orange in the "Glorious Revolution" of 1688.

== Life ==
John Romer served in the artillery in Flanders, Spain, and on several expeditions, and in 1708 was an ensign in Brigadier Rooke's regiment. On 28 August 1708 he was appointed, by royal warrant, as assistant engineer to his father at Portsmouth, and was employed on works for protecting the shore near the Blockhouse, from the sea. On 4 April 1713 he was promoted to lieutenant in the 4th Foot. In 1715 he was placed on half-pay from his regiment, and on 20 April was appointed engineer at Sheerness, his district comprising the defences of the Rivers Thames and Medway. He was employed at Portsmouth at the end of 1716, but returned to Sheerness on 7 April of the following year. At the end of July 1719, he joined the expedition to Vigo, Spain, under Richard Temple, 1st Viscount Cobham, and took part in the capture of the citadel, which surrendered on 10 October.

On his return home, Romer was appointed engineer in charge of the northern district and Scotland, and arrived in Edinburgh on 19 March 1720. In Scotland he had under his charge the erection of barracks in the Highlands, as proposed by Field Marshal George Wade, at Inversnaid, Ruthven, Bernera, and Killiwhimen (Fort Augustus). He was involved in defence work at Fort William, and Fort George. On 24 September 1722, he was promoted to engineer-in-ordinary, and on 30 October he went to the office of the Board of Ordnance in London, whence he carried out the administration of the Scottish and northern engineer districts for many years. In the 1730s, Romer was responsible for the design of improved artillery defences and bastions on the north and west sides of Edinburgh Castle, which were built by William Adam, and include the Argyle Battery, Mills Mount Battery, the Low Defences and the Western Defences. He was promoted to be sub-director of engineers on 1 April 1730, captain-lieutenant on 22 December 1738, and captain in the 4th Foot (Barrell's Regiment) on 19 January 1739. In 1742 he became director of engineers. During 1745 and 1746 he served under the Duke of Cumberland in the suppression of the Jacobite rebellion, and was wounded at Culloden, on 16 April 1746.

Romer retired from service in 1751. He married, in 1711, Mary Hammond, by whom he had a son John (1713–1775), many of whose descendants entered the army, and distinguished themselves in active service. Among drawings by John Lambertus Romer, now held by the British Museum, are plans of Fort Augustus, Scotland, and the fortifications of Portsmouth in 1725. He died in 1754, and was buried in St. Margaret's, Westminster.
