= Glenelg, Highland =

Coordinates: 57.212°N 5.624°W

Glenelg: Scottish Gaelic: Glinn Eilg
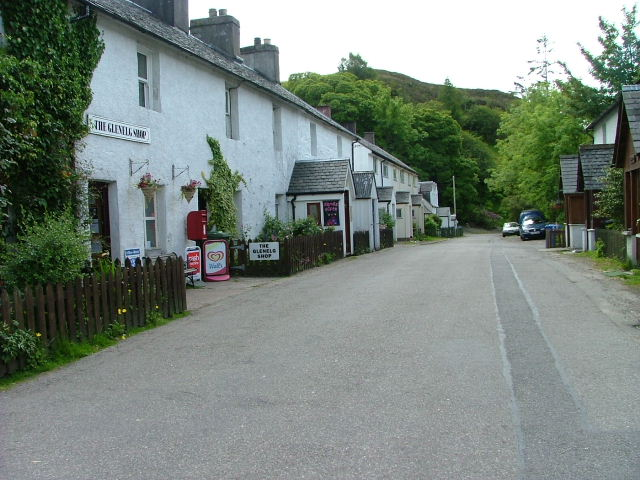
- Glenelg with village shop at left, part of a listed building

- Location within the Ross and Cromarty area
- Population: 1,507 (2001)
- OS grid reference: NG8119
- Civil parish: Glenelg
- Council area: Highland
- Lieutenancy area: Ross and Cromarty
- Country: Scotland
- Sovereign state: United Kingdom
- Post town: KYLE
- Postcode district: IV40
- Dialling code: 01599
- Police: Scotland
- Fire: Scottish
- Ambulance: Scottish
- UK Parliament: Inverness, Skye and West Ross-shire
- Scottish Parliament: Skye, Lochaber and Badenoch

Glenelg (Scottish Gaelic: Glinn Eilg, also Gleann Eilg) is a scattered community area and civil parish in the Lochalsh area of Highland in western Scotland.

The main village is called Kirkton of Glenelg and commonly referred to as "Glenelg". There is a smaller hamlet less than one mile (two kilometres) to the south by the jetty and skirting Glenelg Bay, known as Quarry. There are several other clusters of houses scattered over Glenelg including up Glen Beag and Glen More and on the road leading to the ferry at Kyle Rhea. The parish covers a large area including Knoydart, North Morar and the ferry port of Mallaig. At the 2001 census it had a population of 1,507. The smaller "settlement zone" around Kirkton had a population of 283. In 2011 Highland Council estimated that the community of Glenelg and Arnisdale had a population of 291.

== Geography ==
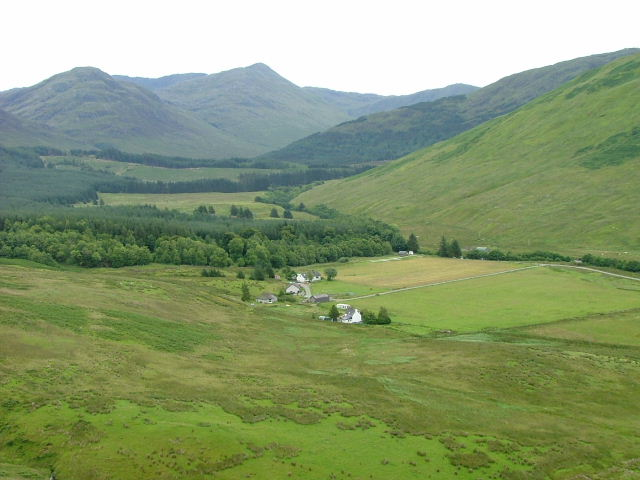
Glen More

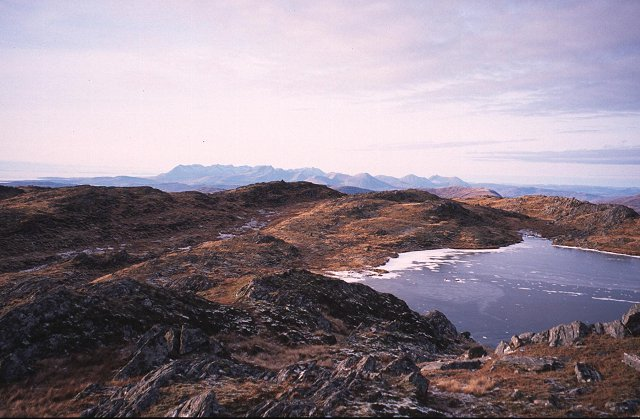
Beinn a'Chapuil

Glenelg is located south of Loch Alsh, by the tidal Kyle Rhea narrows, where the Isle of Skye is closest to the mainland. Between November and February, the only access to Glenelg is by road over the 339-metre (1,112 ft) Mam Ratagan – known loosely as "the Bealach" (pass) – from Shiel Bridge on the main road from Inverness to Skye. From the summit of Mam Ratagan the road runs gently into Glenelg down Glen More (Gleann Mhòr, "big valley"), which is otherwise isolated from Loch Duich by Beinn a Chuirn, and from Loch Alsh by Glas Beinn. There is a second valley, approximately parallel to Glen More and to the south known as Glen Beag (Gleann Beag, "small valley"), separated from Glen More by Beinn a' Chaonich. On reaching the coast, the road continues southwards, following the shore of Loch Hourn, where it terminates at Corran; Loch Hourn is separated from Glen Beag by Beinn a' Chapuill and Beinn Sgritheall.

Its proximity to Skye meant that Glenelg was formerly of more strategic importance and had a significantly larger population. It appears on the relevant map of the first atlas of Scotland, published by Joan Blaeu in Amsterdam in 1662, for instance. Cattle from the outer islands were taken to Uig in the north of Skye to join with those reared on Skye and other nearby islands, driven south to the village of Kylerhea, and, tied together in dozens, nose ring to tail and guided by a rowing boat, swum the 534 metres to the mainland before being herded to market along the drovers' road through Glen Beag, on to Kinlochhourn and then to the markets at Stirling and Falkirk and elsewhere in the Scottish Lowlands. Between March and October, there is the option to cross the Kyle Rhea strait by ferry (see below).

Following the Jacobite rising of 1715, Glenelg was chosen along with Fort George, Fort Augustus and Fort William as one of four sites in the Highlands for a military barracks. These were completed in 1725 and a military road soon linked Glenelg to the rest of General George Wade's road network. Ultimately unsuccessful in preventing the 1745 uprising and not needed after the Highland Clearances, the Bernera Barracks are now ruined.

The war memorial in Glenelg was erected in 1920 to a design by Sir Robert Lorimer.

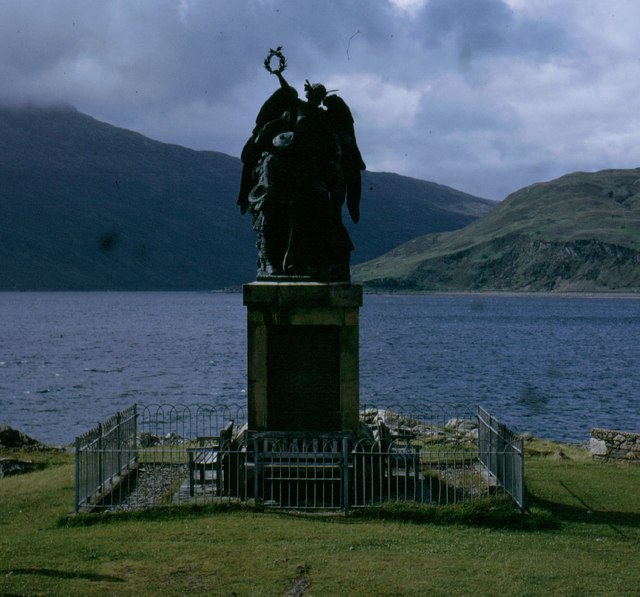
The Glenelg War Memorial

A person from Glenelg is known in Gaelic as an Eilgeach.

== Ferry ==
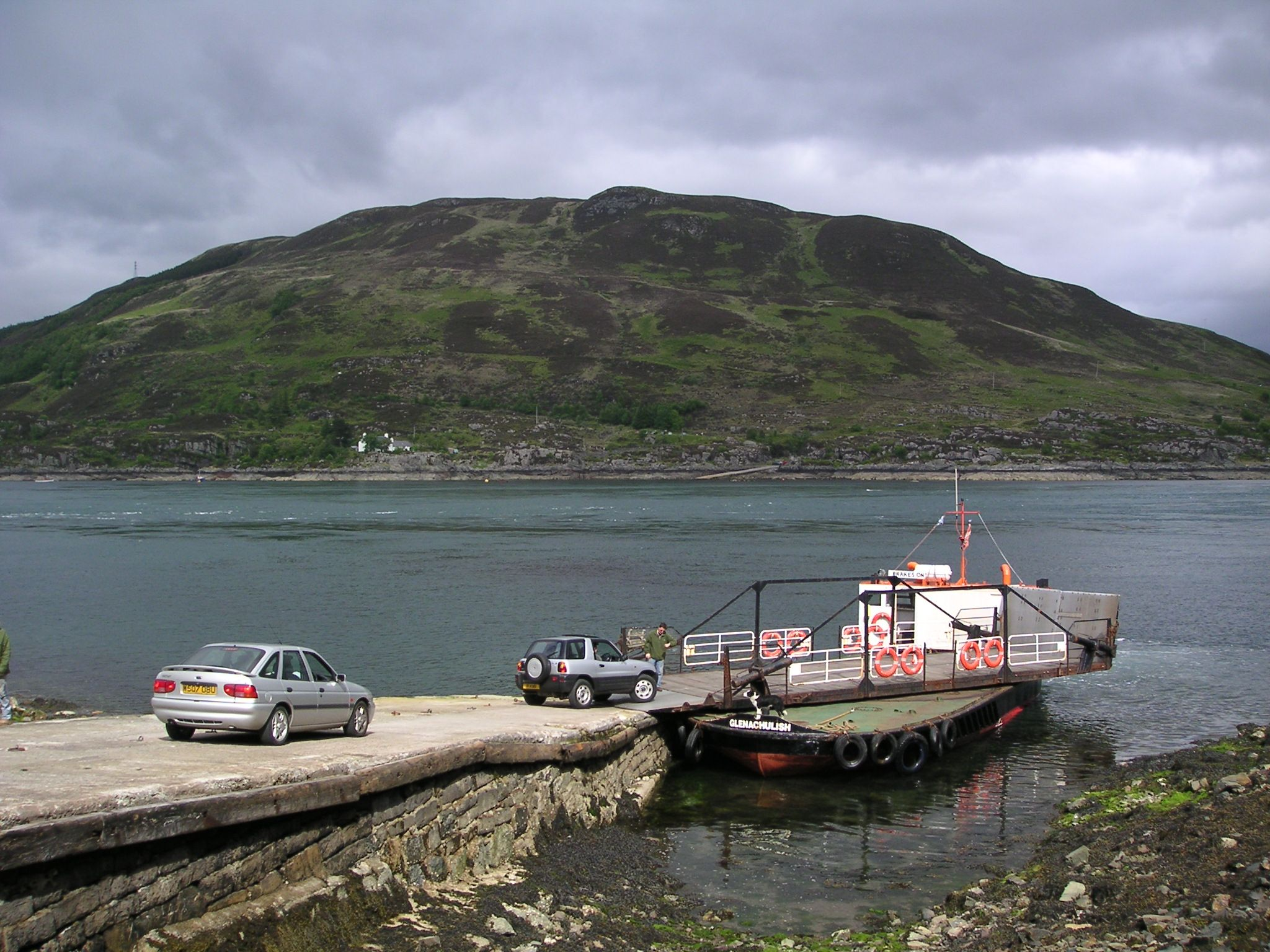
Glenelg to Kylerhea ferry

Between March and October, a small vehicle ferry connects to Kylerhea on Skye across the powerful currents of the narrows. The ferry used on the crossing since 1982 is the MV Glenachulish, the last hand-operated steel turntable ferry in operation in the world. Built in 1969 for the Ballachulish crossing by the Ailsa Shipbuilding Company in Troon, it is now operated by a local community-interest company. The ferry can transport six cars plus foot passengers on the open deck. It is unusual in that the ferry ties up alongside the slipway and the crew manually turn the deck, which is built on a turntable, for cars and passengers to embark and disembark. When the Ballachulish Bridge opened in 1975, it became the relief vessel for Corran, Kylesku and Kessock near Inverness. The ferry service was suspended in 2020 because of the COVID-19 pandemic but restarted on 1 May 2021.

The Glenelg Ferry slipway was designed by Thomas Telford in 1818 and is Category B listed.

== Attractions ==
Glenelg attracts tourists to the remains of two of the best-preserved brochs (Dun Telve and Dun Troddan) on mainland Scotland, located in Glen Beag, about three miles further along the road from the main Glenelg settlement.

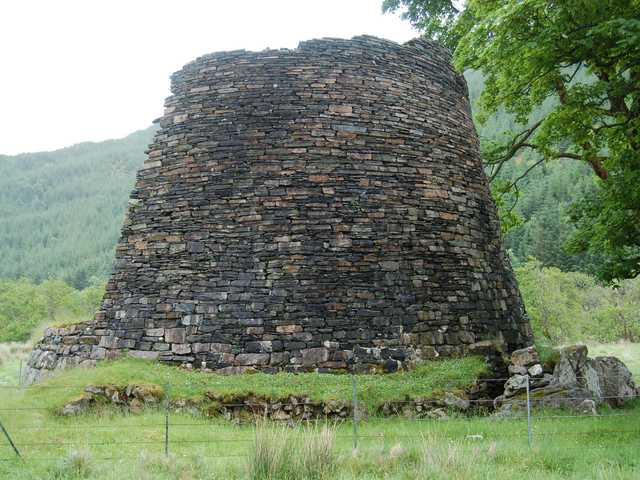
Dun Telve Broch

== Amenities ==
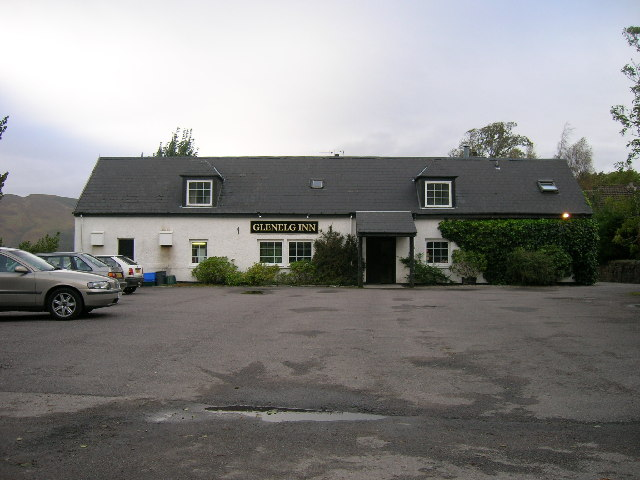
The Glenelg Inn

The community's only pub is the Glenelg Inn. This stands on the site of the earlier Glenelg Hotel, a hotel with marble flooring which caught fire in 1946 and had to be demolished. There is also a village shop, an organic market garden/croft and associated cafe, in Glen Beag. There is also a seasonal cafe in the Glenelg Village Hall in Kirkton and local businesses offering local services including bicycle hire and repair.

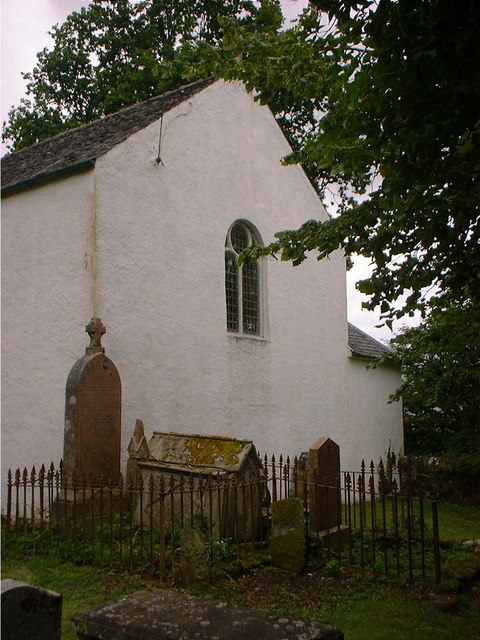
Glenelg Church

Glenelg Parish Church of Scotland has an 18th-century core. It underwent repairs from 1821 to 1830, the interior was remodelled in 1863 and again in 1929. There is an 18th-century bird-cage bellcote to the west gable. It is now united with other churches across Lochalsh area as part of the South West Ross Church of Scotland. Within the area also meets Glenelg Free Church of Scotland (part of Glenelg and Inverinate Free Church), which uses the Glenelg Parish Church for their evening service; and Glenelg Christian Fellowship, part of the Apostolic Church.

== Glenelg Amateur Football Club ==
Glenelg Amateur Football Club is known to locals by their nickname of "The Duffers", were re-formed in 2011 by Grant MacLeod.

In 2019, Glenelg FC won the Clan Donald Cup, their first trophy in over 43 years.

== Etymology ==
Although the name nowadays refers to the whole district, it is likely that it originally referred only to the glen containing the brochs. The specific element of the name (Eilg) is found elsewhere, such as in Elgin (Gaelic Eilginn) and is generally accepted as being a kenning for Ireland. Other such names include Banavie, Banff, Atholl, Lochearn, Auldearn, and show Gaelic settlers using the same migrant naming practice as gives us placenames such as New Caledonia and New York.

The name is unusual in that it is a palindrome.

== Twinning with Mars ==
Glenelg was officially twinned with Glenelg, Mars, on 20 October 2012. A palindromic name was chosen by NASA because the rover Curiosity would visit the site twice.

== Sandaig and Camusfeàrna ==
The author Gavin Maxwell's retreat at Sandaig (which he called Camusfeàrna, "the bay of the alders", in his book Ring of Bright Water) is within the Glenelg community area around six miles (ten kilometres) south of Kirkton of Glenelg. The house had previously been a smallholding and home for the part-time lighthouse keeper of the Sandaig Lighthouse.

The Sandaig Light formerly on Little Sandaig was built in 1910 by Charles Alexander Stevenson (cousin of the novelist Robert Louis Stevenson) for the Northern Lighthouse Board. In 2002 the tower was restored and moved to the community-owned Glenelg Ferry Terminal where it is now a feature.

The eponymous Sandaig Islands are a small group of islets just off the point in the Sound of Sleat and are known for their fine silvery shell sand beaches.

Sandaig can be accessed by foot from the main Glenelg to Arnisdale Road.

== Notable people ==
- Alasdair Mac Mhaighstir Alasdair, (1698–1770) legendary Scottish Gaelic poet, officer during the Jacobite Uprising of 1745, and Gaelic tutor to Prince Charles Edward Stuart spent his last years at Sandaig
- Terry Nutkins, (1946–2012) naturalist, television presenter and author, and in his youth was one of Gavin Maxwell's otter keepers.
- Neil M. Gunn, novelist, spent holidays with his sister Mary and her husband Dr Keillor who was the local GP, and regarded it as his second home.
- Gavin Maxwell, (1914–1969) was a Scottish naturalist and author, best known for Ring of Bright Water (1960), his account of his life at Sandaig with his pet otter Mijbil.
- (Frederick) Anthony Hamilton Wills, 2nd Baron Dulverton (1915–1992) owner of Eilanreach Estate on which Sandaig is situated.
- Dr Samuel Johnson and James Boswell stayed at the inn now known as Ferry House, on their tour of the Highlands in 1773 later published as Journey to the Western Isles of Scotland (1775).
- Walter Stuart, Master of Blantyre (1851–1895), Scottish nobleman, lived at Glenelg during the last years of his life, active in farming and yachting.
