= Dun Troddan =

Iron-age broch in Scotland

- Dùn Trodan
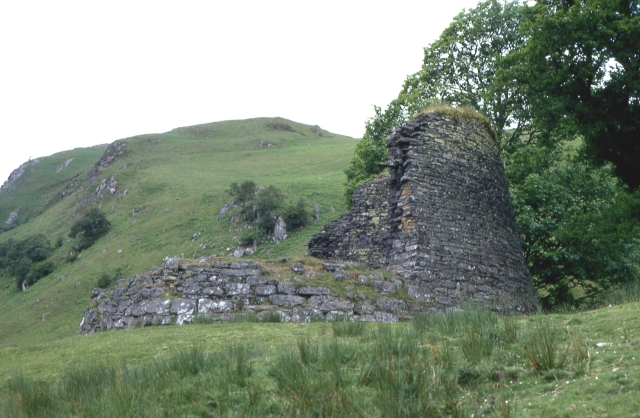
- Dun Troddan

- Location within Highland
- 57.19466°N 5.586708°W
- Type: Broch
- Periods: Iron Age
- Location: Scottish Highlands

Site notes
- Owner: Historic Scotland
- Public access: Yes

Dun Troddan (Scottish Gaelic: Dùn Trodan) is an iron-age broch located about 5 kilometres (3.1 mi) southeast of the village of Kirkton,Glenelg, Highland, in Scotland. It is one of the best-preserved brochs in Scotland.

== Location ==
Dun Troddan (grid reference NG83401724) stands on a level rock platform north of the Abhainn a’ Ghlinne Bhig, in the lower reaches of Gleann Beag. It lies just north of the minor road leading south from Kirkton, Glenelg. It can be accessed via a steep path. The neighbouring broch of Dun Telve lies 470 metres (510 yd) to the west, whilst the "semi-broch" known as Dun Grugaig is around 2 kilometres (1.2 mi) to the southeast.

== History ==
The brochs date from the Iron Age, approximately 2000 years ago.

Dun Troddan was first sketched in about 1720, when it was still an intact tower. It is thought that it was over 12 metres (39 ft) high in 1720, and it was described as being "by far the most entire of any in that Country". It was robbed for stone in 1722 during the construction of Bernera Barracks in Glenelg. The broch was visited by Thomas Pennant in 1772, and it was still a substantial structure, although it had lost the upper gallery by this time. It was cleared of "debris" without any supervision and consolidated by the Office of Works in the years between 1914 and 1920. The broch is now in the care of Historic Environment Scotland.

== Description ==
The broch consists of a drystone tower which measures around 17.5 metres (57 ft) in diameter, and currently stands to a maximum height of 7 metres (23 ft). The external walls are 4.5 metres (15 ft) thick at the base.

The entrance is on the southwest side, and is now roofless. On the left side of the entrance passage is a small side-chamber, sometimes called a "guard cell". The broch has features now missing from Dun Telve; these include a number of postholes in the floor and a hearth. Built into the hearth is a broken quern-stone. The central court is an almost perfect circle with a diameter of 8.56 metres (28.1 ft).

An internal doorway in the remaining high part of the wall provides access to a stairway. From here it is possible to ascend nine stairs to a first floor landing. The landing is 5.7 metres (19 ft) long, at a height of 2.4 metres (7 ft 10 in) above the central court. At the end of the landing can be seen the first step which would have led up the next flight of stairs.
