= Dun Telve =

Iron-age broch in the Highland Region of Scotland

- Dùn Teilbh
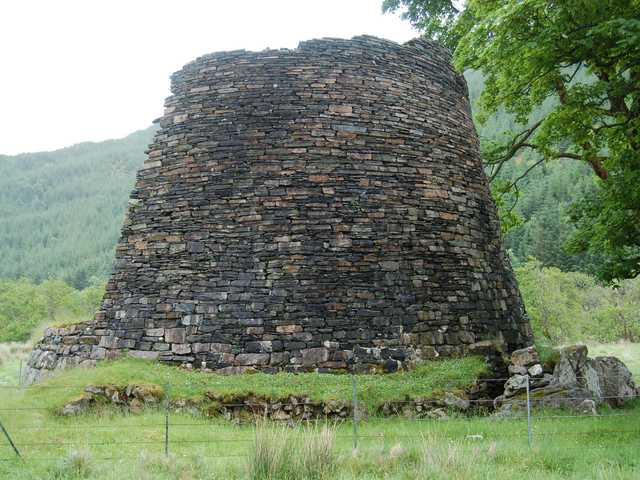
- Dun Telve

- Location within Highland
- 57.194613°N 5.594653°W
- Type: Broch
- Periods: Iron Age
- Location: Scottish Highlands

Site notes
- Owner: Historic Scotland
- Public access: Yes

Dun Telve (Scottish Gaelic: Dùn Teilbh) is an iron-age broch located about four kilometres (2.5 mi) southeast of Kirkton, the main village of the community of Glenelg, Inverness-shire in the Highland Region of Scotland. It is one of the best preserved brochs in Scotland.

== Location ==
Dun Telve (grid reference NG82921726) stands on the north bank of the Abhainn a’ Ghlinne Bhig, in the lower reaches of Gleann Beag. It lies next to the minor road which leads south from Kirkton, the main village in Glenelg. The neighbouring broch of Dun Troddan lies 470 metres (1,540 ft) to the east, and the "semi-broch" known as Dun Grugaig is around 2.5 kilometres (1.6 mi) further east.

== History ==
The brochs date from the Iron Age, approximately 2000 years ago.

It is thought that the broch was robbed for stone in 1722 (probably for the building of Bernera Barracks in Glenelg). Dun Telve was popular with tourists by the late 18th century, and was first sketched in the late 18th century. It was surveyed in detail in 1871–1873 by Henry Dryden. The building was brought into state care between 1882 and 1901 and the boundary markers that define the area of guardianship are still visible. Around 1914 a programme of works was undertaken by the Office of Works which included "clearing out" the interior, inserting concrete into the upper intramural space and pointing the internal wall-face. The broch has never been archaeologically excavated. The broch is now in the care of Historic Environment Scotland.

== Description ==
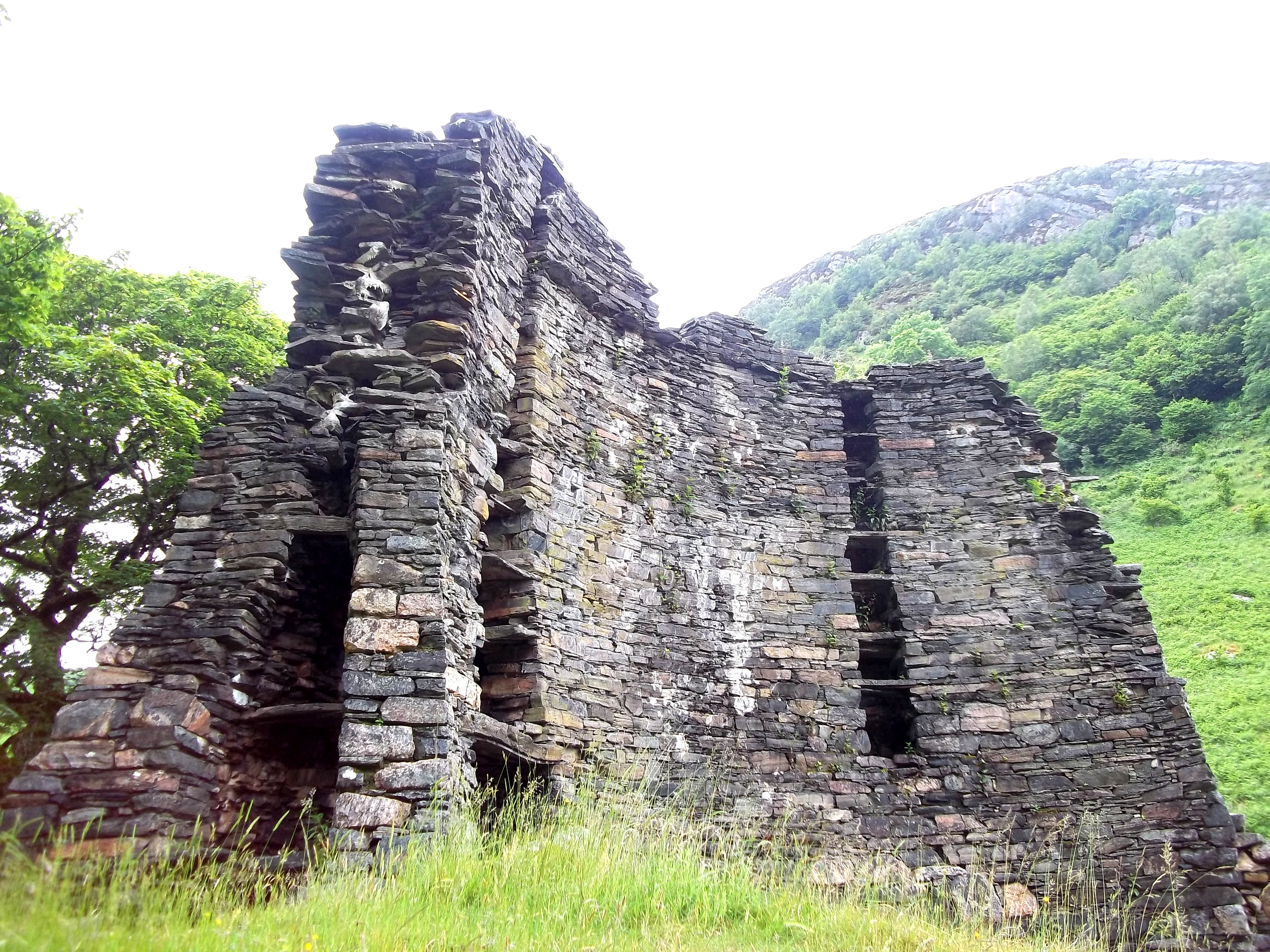
View from the south, showing the double-walls

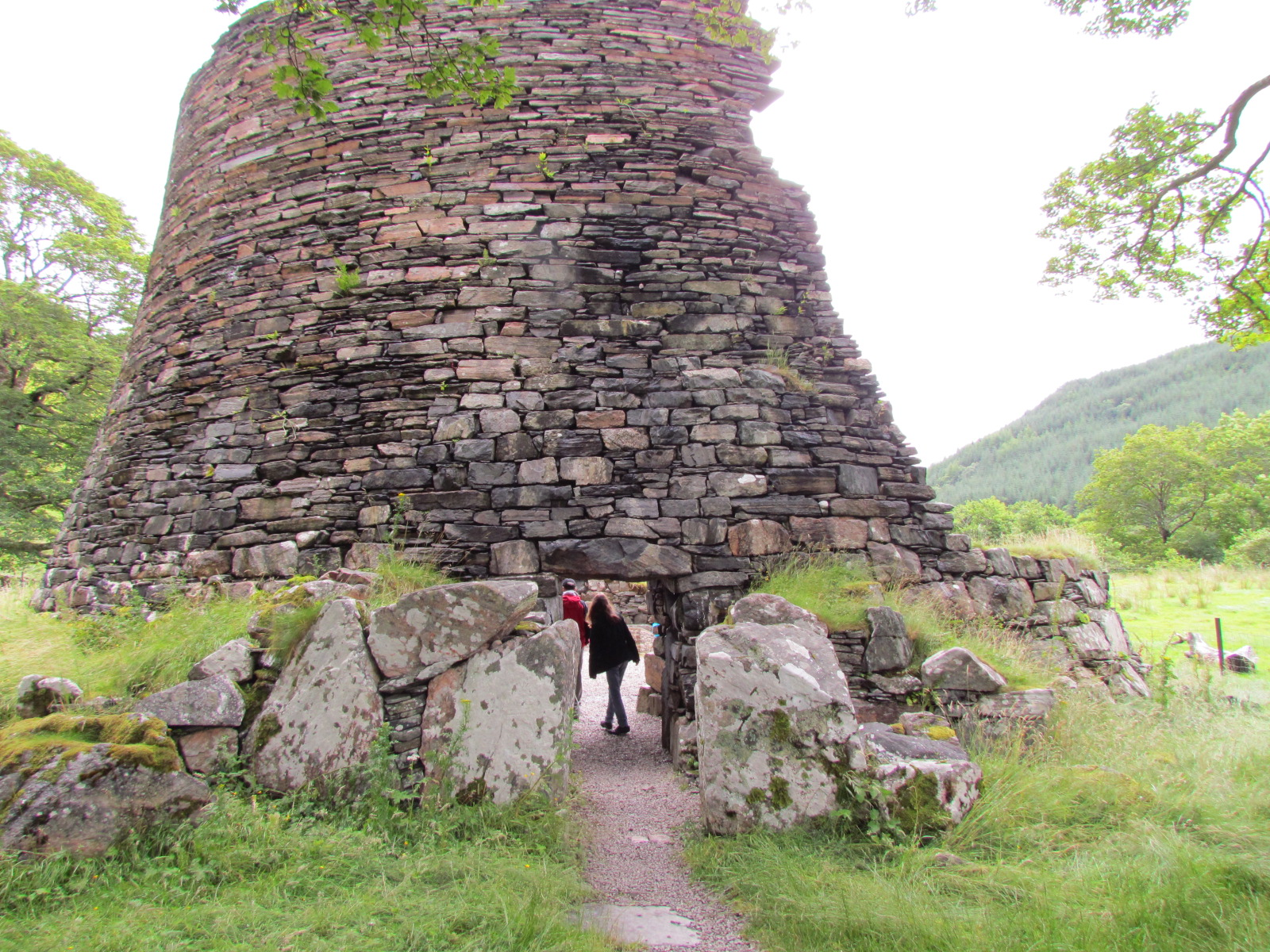
View from the west, showing the entrance

The broch consists of a drystone tower which measures 18.3 metres (60 ft) in diameter, and currently stands to a maximum height of 10.2 metres (33 ft) to the west and northwest. The external walls are 4.3 metres (14 ft) thick at the base and 1.2 metres (3 ft 11 in) thick at the top. The entrance is on the west but it has been modified, probably in the mid-19th century. On the south side of the entrance passage is a small side-chamber, sometimes called a "guard cell". A doorway on the north side of the interior of the broch provides access first to an internal cell and then to the intramural space that narrows as it rises through to the top of the surviving wall. Access up the tower is by a winding stone stair, and openings at intervals once gave access to the upper floors. The presence of two horizontal stone ledges, or scarcements, up the height of the surviving section suggests that there were two upper floors. The top floor would have been around nine metres (30 ft) above ground level.

Structures appended to the west and northwest sides of Dun Telve include at least one rectangular building.
