= Broch =

Type of Iron Age drystone hollow-walled structure in Scotland

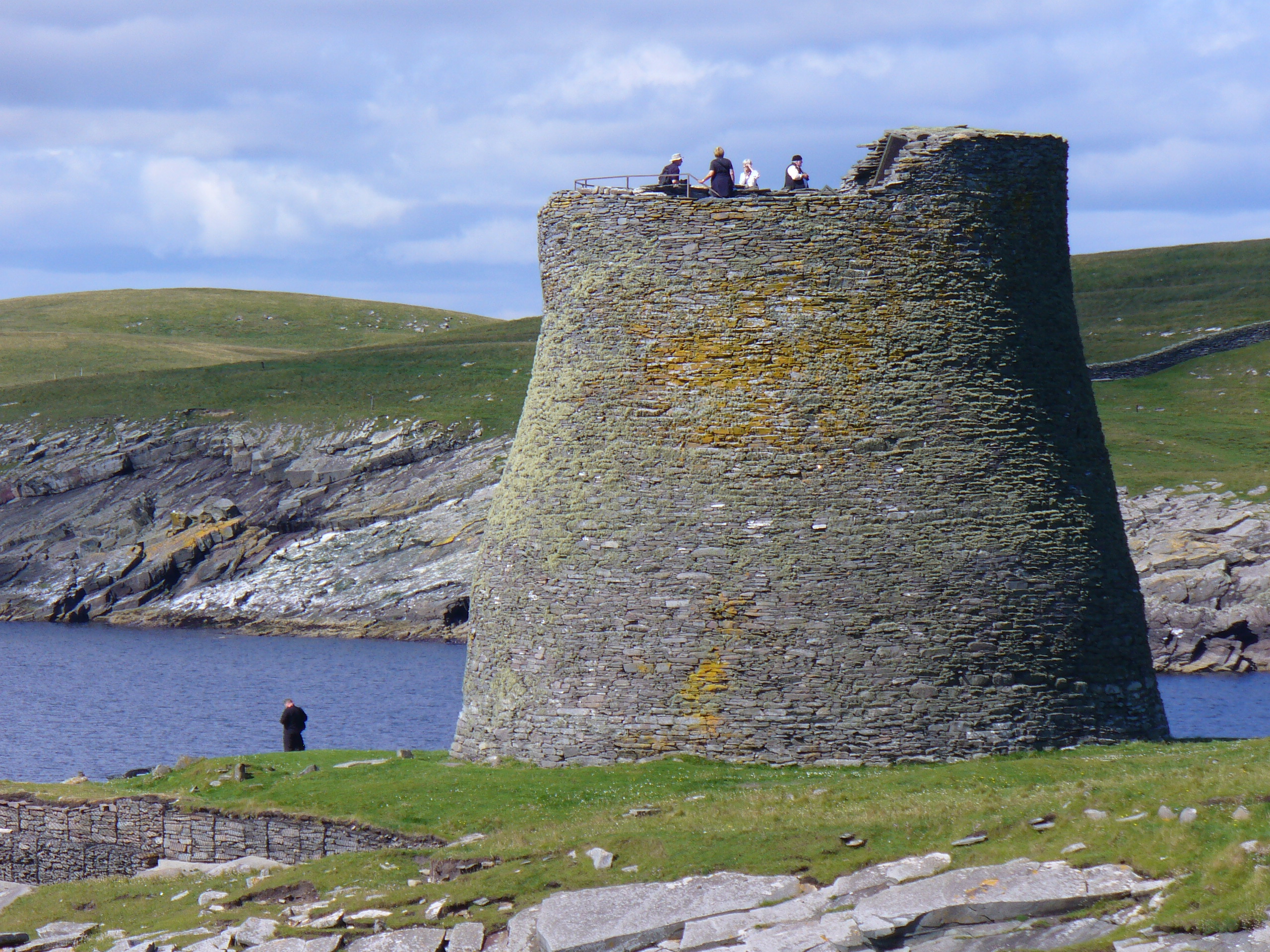
Broch of Mousa

In archaeology, a broch /brɒx/ is an Iron Age drystone hollow-walled structure found in Scotland. Brochs belong to the classification "complex Atlantic roundhouse" devised by Scottish archaeologists in the 1980s.

Brochs are roundhouse buildings found throughout Atlantic Scotland. The word broch is derived from the Lowland Scots 'brough', meaning fort. In the mid-19th century, Scottish antiquaries called brochs 'burgs', after Old Norse borg, with the same meaning. Brochs are often referred to as dùns in the west, and they are the most spectacular of a complex class of buildings found in northern Scotland. There are approximately 571 candidate broch sites throughout the country, according to the Royal Commission on the Ancient and Historical Monuments of Scotland.

The origin of brochs is still subject to ongoing research. While most mid-20th century archaeologists believed that brochs were built by invading chieftains displaced from the south of the English isles, there is now little doubt that the hollow-walled broch tower first developed in what is now Scotland. The first brochs may have been built circa 300 BC, and there is evidence to suggest that they were used primarily for defensive or offensive purposes.

The distribution of brochs is centred on northern Scotland, with the densest concentrations found in Caithness, Sutherland, and the Northern Isles. A few examples occur in the Scottish Borders and on the west coast of Dumfries and Galloway, and near Stirling. The original interpretation of brochs was that they were defensive structures, places of refuge for the community and their livestock. They were sometimes regarded as the work of Danes or Picts, and from the 1930s to the 1960s, archaeologists regarded them as proto-castles where local landowners held sway over a subject population.

However, the castle theory fell from favour among Scottish archaeologists in the 1980s, due to a lack of supporting archaeological evidence. These archaeologists suggested defensibility was never a major concern in the siting of a broch, and argued that they may have been the "stately homes" of their time, objects of prestige and very visible demonstrations of superiority for important families. Once again, however, there is a lack of archaeological proof for this reconstruction, and the sheer number of brochs makes it problematic. The article concludes by stating that the purpose of brochs may have been a combination of defensive, offensive, and symbolic functions.

== Origin and definition ==
The word broch is derived from Lowland Scots 'brough', meaning (among other things) fort. In the mid-19th century Scottish antiquaries called brochs 'burgs', after Old Norse borg, with the same meaning. Place names in Scandinavian Scotland such as Burgawater and Burgan show that Old Norse borg is the older word used for these structures in the north. Brochs are often referred to as dùn in the west. Antiquarians began to use the spelling broch in the 1870s.

A precise definition for the word has proved elusive. Brochs are the most spectacular of a complex class of roundhouse buildings found throughout Atlantic Scotland. The Shetland Amenity Trust lists about 120 sites in Shetland as candidate brochs, while the Royal Commission on the Ancient and Historical Monuments of Scotland (RCAHMS) identifies a total of 571 candidate broch sites throughout the country. Researcher Euan MacKie, using a restricted definition, has proposed a much smaller total for Scotland of 104.

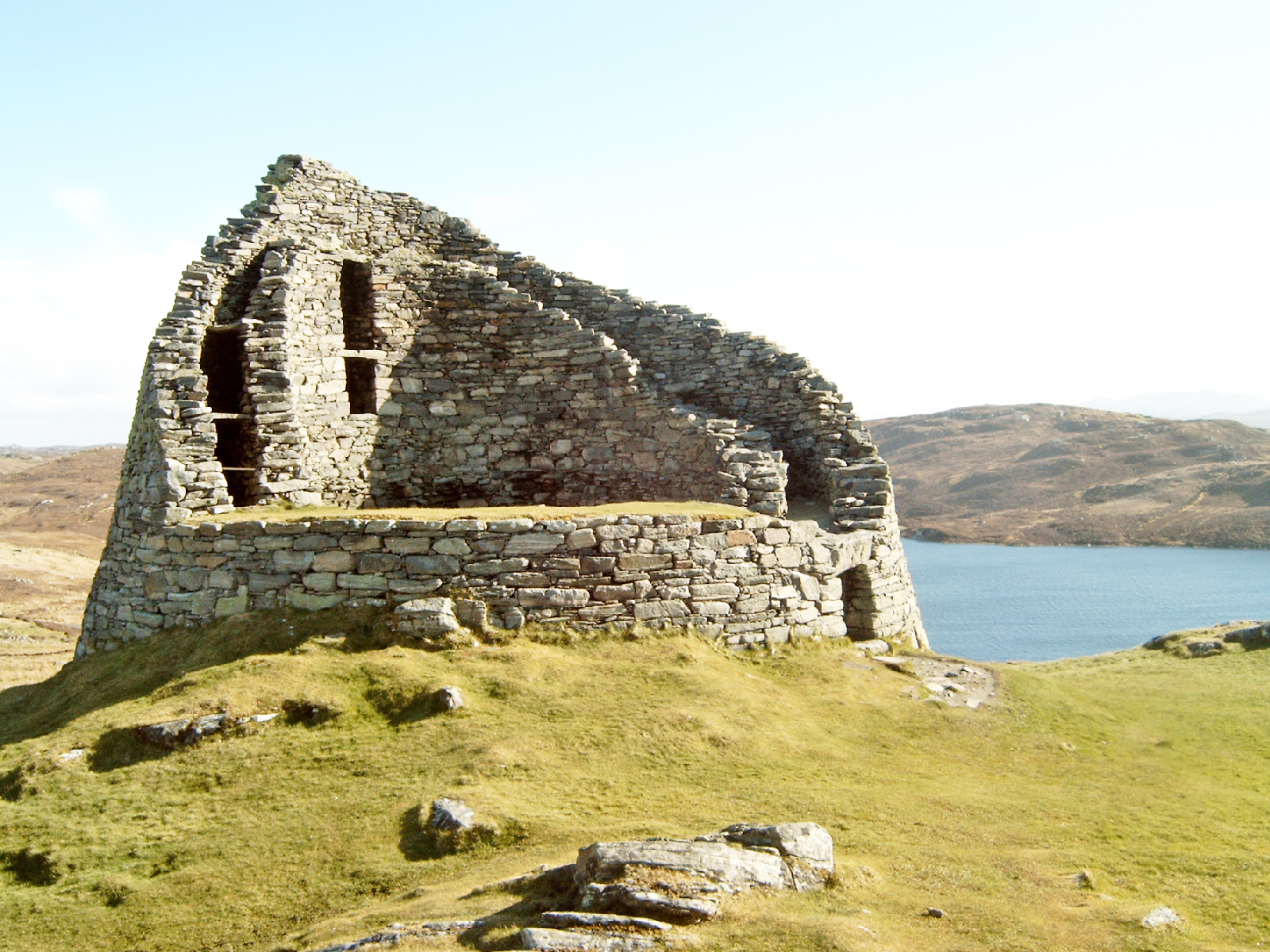
Remains of Dun Carloway broch, Lewis, Scotland

The origin of brochs is a subject of continuing research. Eighty years ago most archaeologists believed that brochs, usually regarded as the 'castles' of Iron Age chieftains, were built by immigrants who had been pushed northward after being displaced first by the intrusions of Belgic tribes into what is now southeast England at the end of the 2nd century BC and later by the Roman invasion of southern Britain beginning in AD 43. Yet there is now little doubt that the hollow-walled broch tower was an invention in what is now Scotland; even the kinds of pottery found inside them that most resembled south British styles were local hybrid forms.

The first of the modern review articles on the subject (MacKie 1965) did not, as is commonly believed, propose that brochs were built by immigrants, but rather that a hybrid culture formed from the blending of a small number of immigrants with the native population of the Hebrides produced them in the 1st century BC, basing them on earlier, simpler, promontory forts. This view contrasted, for example, with that of Sir W. Lindsay Scott, who argued, following V. Gordon Childe (1935), for a wholesale migration into Atlantic Scotland of people from southwest England.

MacKie's theory has fallen from favour too, mainly because starting in the 1970s there was a general move in archaeology away from 'diffusionist' explanations towards those pointing to exclusively indigenous development. Meanwhile, the increasing number – albeit still pitifully few – of radiocarbon dates for the primary use of brochs (as opposed to their later, secondary use) still suggests that most of the towers were built in the 1st centuries BC and AD. A few may be earlier, notably the one proposed for Old Scatness Broch in Shetland, where a sheep bone dating to between 390 and 200 BC has been reported.

The other broch claimed to be substantially older than the 1st century BC is Crosskirk in Caithness, but a recent review of the evidence suggests that it cannot plausibly be assigned a date earlier than the 1st centuries BC/AD.

== Distribution ==
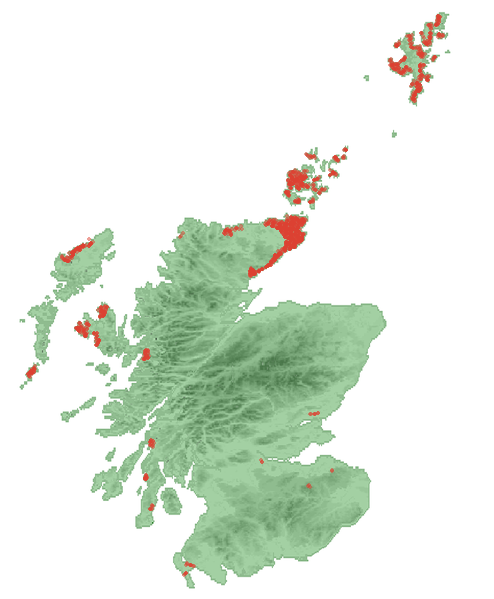
Overview of the distribution of brochs.

The distribution of brochs is centred on northern Scotland. Caithness, Sutherland and the Northern Isles have the densest concentrations, but there are many examples in the west of Scotland and the Hebrides. Although mainly concentrated in the northern Highlands and the Islands, a few examples occur in the Borders (for example Edin's Hall Broch and Bow Castle Broch), on the west coast of Dumfries and Galloway, and near Stirling. In a c. 1560 sketch there appears to be a broch by the river next to Annan Castle in Dumfries and Galloway. This small group of southern brochs has never been satisfactorily explained.

== Purposes ==
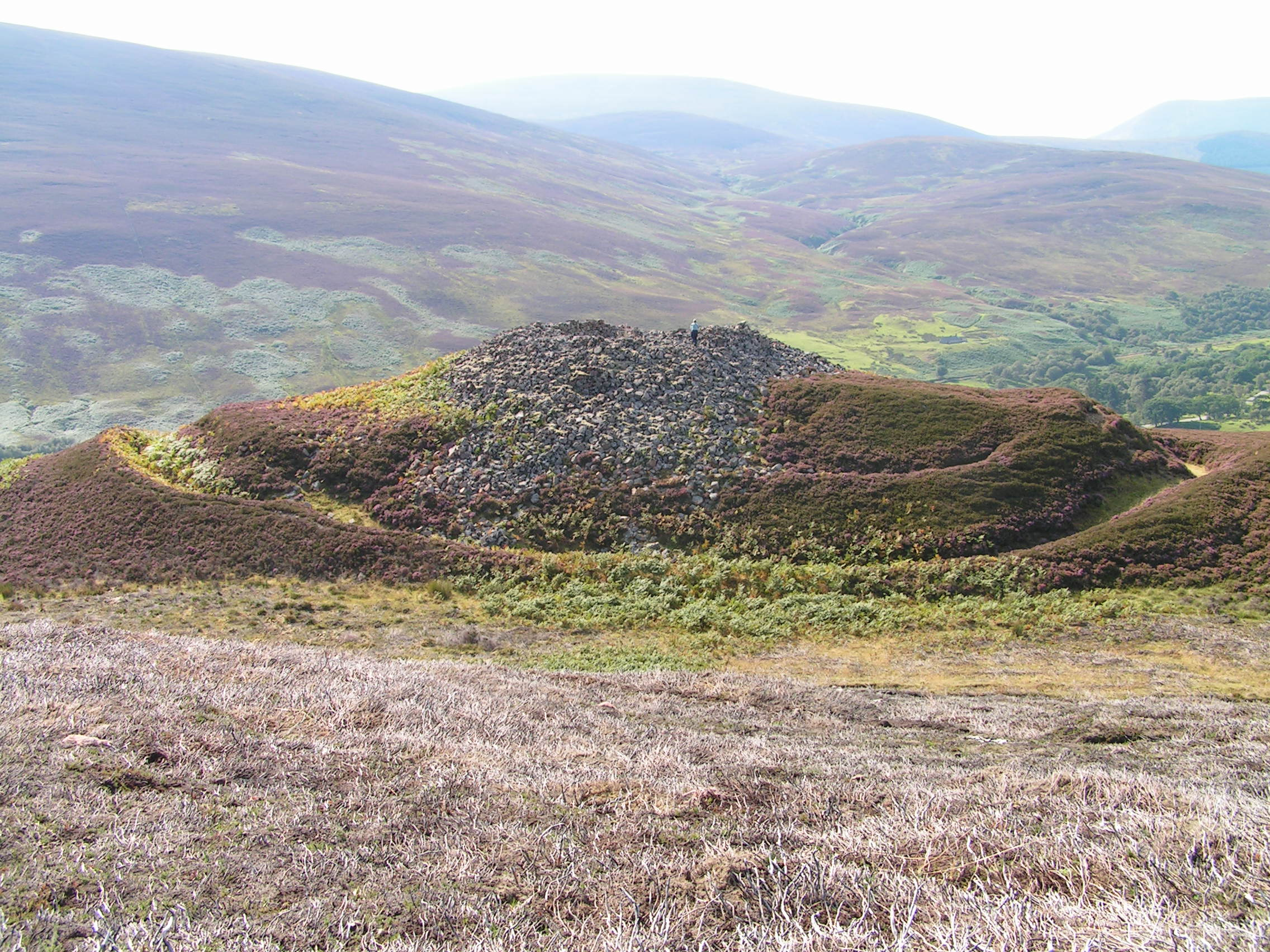
The remains of Kilphedir broch, Sutherland, are surrounded by massive earthworks.

The original interpretation of brochs, favoured by 19th-century antiquarians, was that they were defensive structures, places of refuge for the community and their livestock. They were sometimes regarded as the work of Danes or Picts. From the 1930s to the 1960s, archaeologists such as V. Gordon Childe and later John Hamilton regarded them as castles where local landowners held sway over a subject population.

The castle theory fell from favour among Scottish archaeologists in the 1980s, due to a lack of supporting archaeological evidence. These archaeologists suggested defensibility was never a major concern in the siting of a broch, and argued that they may have been the "stately homes" of their time, objects of prestige and very visible demonstrations of superiority for important families (Armit 2003). Once again, however, there is a lack of archaeological proof for this reconstruction, and the sheer number of brochs, sometimes in places with a lack of good land, makes it problematic.

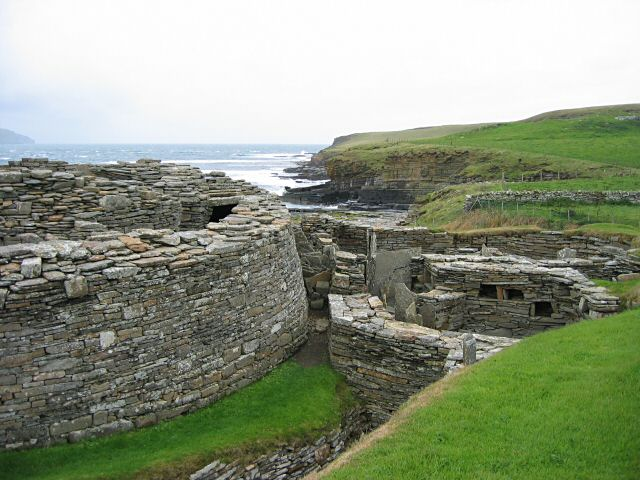
Midhowe Broch

Brochs' close groupings and profusion in many areas may indeed suggest that they had a primarily defensive or even offensive function. Some of them were sited beside precipitous cliffs and were protected by large ramparts, artificial or natural: a good example is at Burland near Gulberwick in Shetland, on a clifftop and cut off from the mainland by huge ditches. Often they are at key strategic points. In Shetland they sometimes cluster on each side of narrow stretches of water: the Broch of Mousa, for instance, is directly opposite another at Burraland in Sandwick. In Orkney there are more than a dozen on the facing shores of Eynhallow Sound, and many at the exits and entrances of the great harbour of Scapa Flow. In Sutherland quite a few are placed along the sides and at the mouths of deep valleys. Writing in 1956 John Stewart suggested that brochs in Shetland were forts put up by a military society to scan and protect the countryside and seas.

Finally, some archaeologists consider broch sites individually, doubting that there ever was a single common purpose for which every broch was constructed. There are differences in the positions, dimensions and likely status of broch in the various areas in which brochs are found. For example, the broch "villages" which occur at a few places in Orkney have no parallel in the Western Isles.

== Structures ==
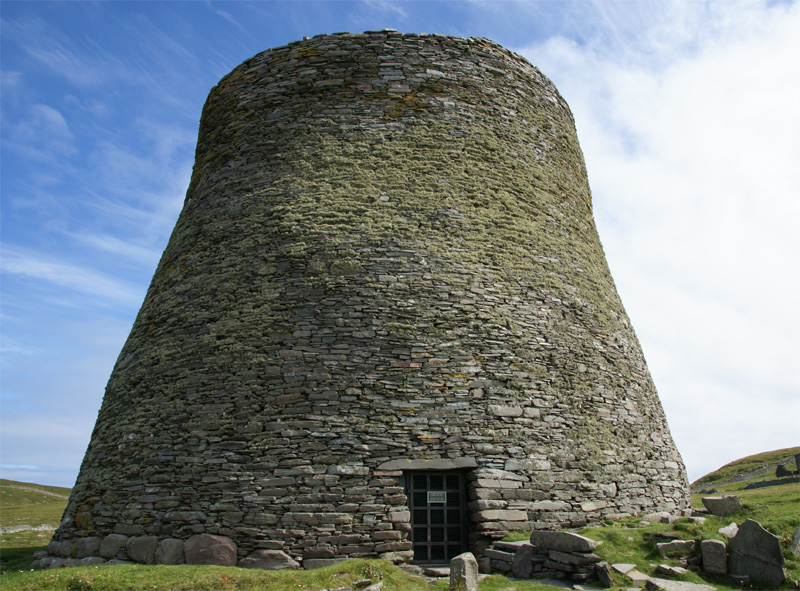
Broch of Mousa in the Shetland Isles

Generally, brochs have a single entrance with bar-holes, door-checks and lintels. There are mural cells and there is a scarcement (ledge), perhaps for timber-framed lean-to dwellings lining the inner face of the wall. Also there is a spiral staircase winding upwards between the inner and outer wall and connecting the galleries. Brochs vary from five to fifteen metres (16 to 49 ft) in internal diameter, with three-metre-thick (9.8 ft) walls. On average, the walls only survive to a few metres in height. There are five extant examples of towers with significantly higher walls: Dun Carloway on Lewis, Dun Telve and Dun Troddan in Glenelg, Mousa in Shetland and Dun Dornaigil in Sutherland, all of whose walls exceed 6.5 metres (21 ft) in height.

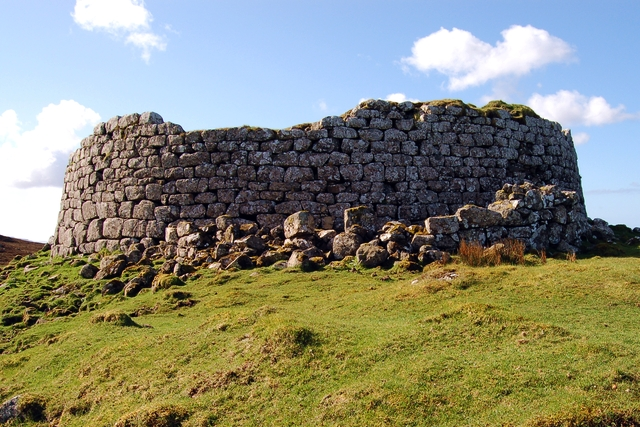
The remains of Dun Hallin Broch, Skye

Mousa's walls are the best preserved and are still 13 metres (43 ft) tall; it is not clear how many brochs originally stood so high. A frequent characteristic is that the walls are galleried: with an open space between, the outer and inner wall skins are separate but tied together with linking stone slabs; these linking slabs may in some cases have served as steps to higher floors. It is normal for there to be a cell breaking off from the passage beside the door; this is known as the guard cell. It has been found in some Shetland brochs that guard cells in entrance passageways are close to large door-check stones. Although there was much argument in the past, it is now generally accepted among some archaeologists that brochs were roofed, perhaps with a conical timber framed roof covered with a locally sourced thatch. The evidence for this assertion is still very scanty, although excavations at Dun Bharabhat, Lewis, may support it. The main difficulty with the interpretation continues to be identifying potential sources of structural timber, though bog and driftwood may have been sources.

Very few of the brochs on the islands of Orkney and Shetland have cells on the ground floor. Most brochs have scarcements (ledges) which may have allowed the construction of a wooden first floor (spotted by the antiquary George Low in Shetland in 1774), and excavations at Loch na Berie on the Isle of Lewis may show signs of a further, second floor (e.g. stairs on the first floor, which head upwards). Some brochs such as Dun Dornaigil and Culswick in Shetland have unusual triangular lintels above the entrance door.

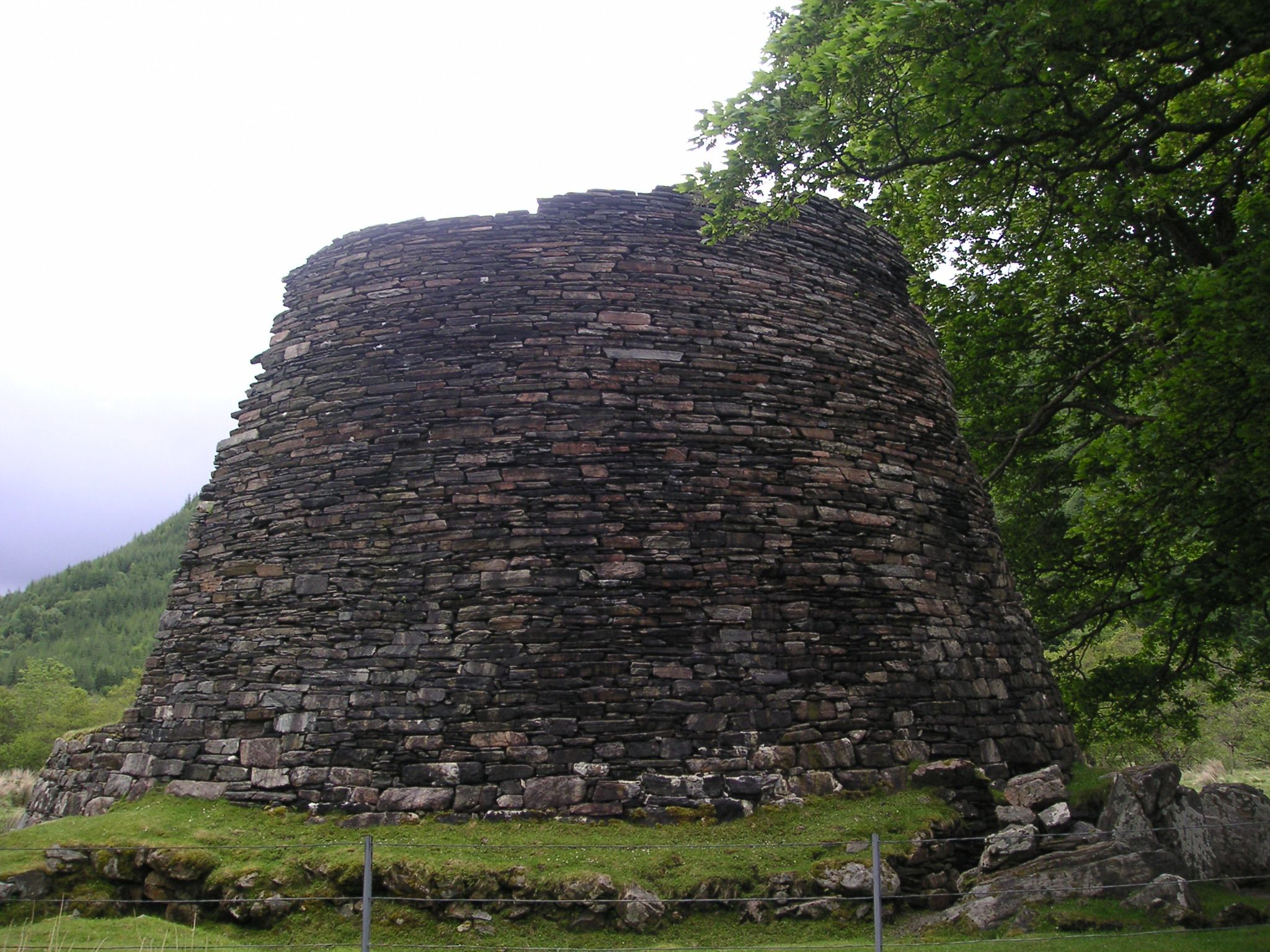
Dun Telve Broch, Glenelg

As in the case of Old Scatness in Shetland (near Jarlshof) and Burroughston on Shapinsay, brochs were sometimes located close to arable land and a source of water (some have wells or natural springs rising within their central space). Sometimes, on the other hand, they were sited in wilderness areas (e.g. Levenwick and Culswick in Shetland, Castle Cole in Sutherland). Brochs are often built beside the sea (Carn Liath, Sutherland); sometimes they are on islands in lochs (e.g. Clickimin in Shetland).

About 20 Orcadian broch sites include small settlements of stone buildings surrounding the main tower. Examples include Howe, near Stromness, Gurness Broch in the north west of Mainland, Orkney, Midhowe on Rousay and Lingro near Kirkwall (destroyed by a farmer in the 1980s). There are "broch village" sites in Caithness, but elsewhere they are unknown.

Most brochs are unexcavated. The end of the broch building period seems to have come around AD 100–200. Those that have been properly examined show that they continued to be in use for many centuries, with the interiors often modified and changed, and that they underwent many phases of habitation and abandonment.

== Heritage status ==
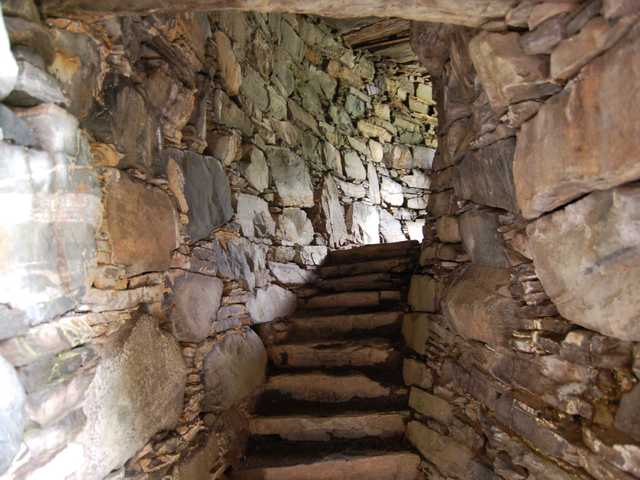
Internal stairs, Broch of Dun Troddan

The Crucible of Iron Age Shetland's Mousa, Old Scatness and Jarlshof sites are on the United Kingdom "Tentative List" of possible nominations for the UNESCO World Heritage Programme list of sites of outstanding cultural or natural importance to the common heritage of humankind. This list, published in July 2010, includes sites that may be nominated for inscription over the next 5–10 years.

== New broch planned ==
The Caithness Broch Project was set up in 2013 as a project in experimental archaeology to build a broch using traditional techniques such as drystone walling. Purposes of the project include possible insights into the purpose of brochs, preservation of local skills in techniques such as drystone wall building, and to attract tourists. As of 2022 a site had not been acquired, and the funding required, estimated at £1m–£3m, had not yet been arranged.

== See also ==
- Oldest buildings in Scotland
- Irish round tower
- Fortified tower
- Nuraghe
- Ringfort

== References and footnotes ==
General references

- Armit, I. (1991) The Atlantic Scottish Iron Age: five levels of chronology, Proc. Soc. Antiq. Scot. v. 121, pp. 181–214; ISSN 0081-1564
- Armit, I. (1996) The Archaeology of Skye and the Western Isles, Edinburgh University Press; ISBN 0-7486-0640-8
- Armit, I. (2003) Towers in the North: The Brochs of Scotland, Stroud : Tempus; ISBN 0-7524-1932-3
- Ballin Smith, B. and Banks, I. (eds) (2002) In the Shadow of the Brochs, the Iron Age in Scotland, Stroud: Tempus; ISBN 0-7524-2517-X
- Fojut, N. (1982) Towards a Geography of Shetland Brochs, Glasgow Archaeological Journal, v. 9, pp. 38–59; ISSN 0305-8980
- Harding, D.W. (2000) The Hebridean Iron Age: Twenty Years’ Research, University of Edinburgh Department of Archaeology, Occasional Paper No. 20; ISSN 0144-3313
- Harding, D.W. (2004) The Iron Age in Northern Britain, London : Routledge; ISBN 0-415-30150-5

Specific references and notes
