= Zenith of Iron Age Shetland =

Tentative World Heritage site in the United Kingdom

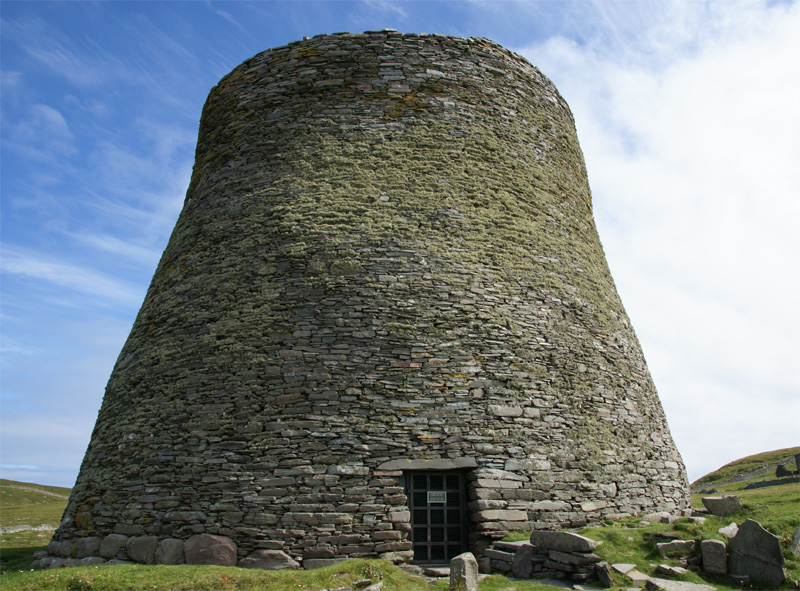
Broch of Mousa

The Zenith of Iron Age Shetland is a combination of three sites in Shetland that have applied to be on the Scottish "Tentative List" of possible nominations for the UNESCO World Heritage Programme list of sites of outstanding cultural or natural importance to the common heritage of humankind. The application was made by the Shetland Amenity Trust in 2010, and in 2011 the site became one of 11 successful UK applications to join the Tentative List, three of them from Scotland.

== Application ==
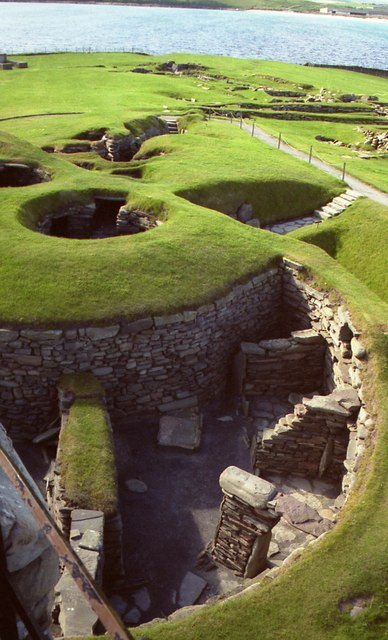
Jarlshof

The application for consideration of "Mousa, Old Scatness and Jarlshof: The Zenith of Iron Age Shetland" as a future World Heritage Site was made after the UK government called for nominations for entries to form the UK's new Tentative List of sites. The Tentative List is used as the candidate list by UNESCO (United Nations Educational, Scientific and Cultural Organization) when considering new sites for inscription. A list of 38 applications in total was announced in July 2010, after which an independent panel of experts was to assess them, with a view to paring it down and submitting it as the UK's new Tentative List to UNESCO in 2011.

Other Scottish sites on the application list included Arbroath Abbey; Buildings of Charles Rennie Mackintosh in Glasgow; and St Andrews, Medieval Burgh and Links, but only the Forth Bridge and the Flow Country of Caithness and Sutherland joined Shetland in the short list for future application. Secretary of State for Scotland Michael Moore said: "All these sites have something special that draws people to them and they are recognisable across the world. I am delighted that so many of Scotland's attractions have stepped forward and answered the UK government's call for world heritage status. John Penrose, the Minister for Tourism & Heritage at the Department for Culture, Media and Sport also said: "what all 38 sites have in common is a wow factor and a cultural resonance that makes them real contenders...".

The Shetland Amenity Trust is the formal applicant for the Zenith application. Val Turner, a Trust archaeologist said: "Our sites are truly amazing. If we get World Heritage site status it will increase the numbers of visitors and help the island community value what it has. We are often seen as a peripheral and neglected area on the edge of the mainland, but we are in the heart of Iron Age and Viking history." The Shetland site falls under the UNESCO definition of a "serial property" that includes component parts related because they belong to "the same historico – cultural group".

Assistance to the council is available from LAWHF – Local Authorities Working Together for World Heritage. Established in 1996, this organisation represents communities across the UK "which have existing or potential World Heritage Sites within their areas."

== Sites ==
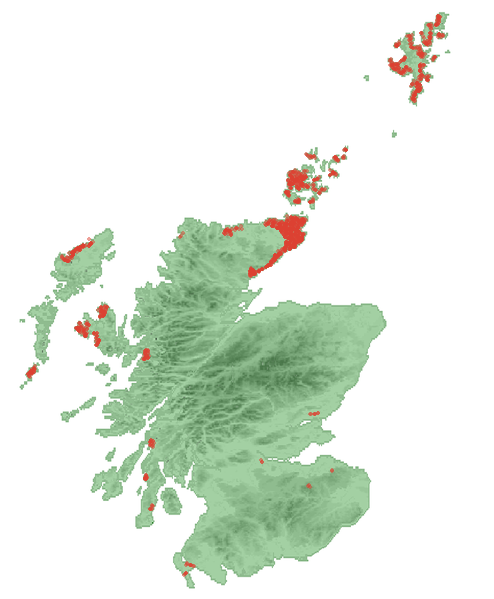
Global overview of the distribution of brochs.

A variety of different archaeological phenomena have been found at the sites, and all three include the remains of round towers known as brochs.

=== Mousa ===
The island of Mousa (59.999°N 1.175°W) has been uninhabited since the 19th century and is best known for the Broch of Mousa, an Iron Age round tower which is the tallest still standing in the world and amongst the best-preserved prehistoric buildings in Europe. One of over 500 brochs built throughout Scotland, it is thought to have been constructed circa 100 BC. The site is managed by Historic Scotland. Mousa lies about 1 kilometre (0.62 mi) off the east coast of the Mainland some 16 kilometres (9.9 mi) north of Old Scatness. According to the tentative list application the broch and environs hosts the world's largest colony of storm petrels and "nowhere else in the world are petrels so accessible to visitors".

=== Old Scatness ===
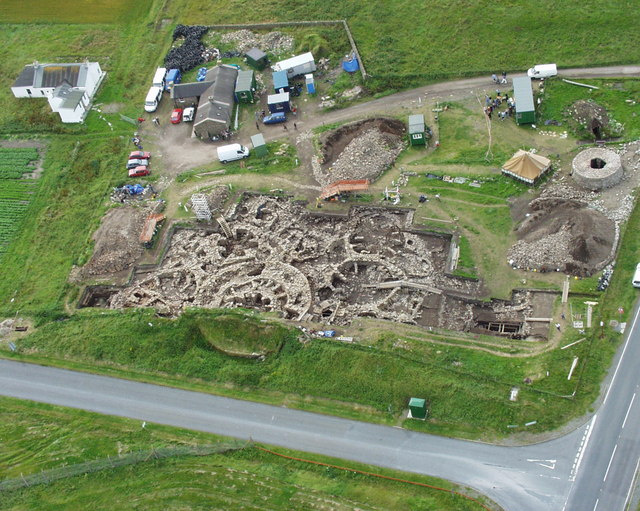
Aerial view of the Old Scatness dig

Old Scatness (59.8791°N 1.3057°W) is an archeological site in the south of the Shetland Mainland, near Sumburgh Airport consisting of mediaeval, Viking, Pictish, and Bronze and Iron Age remains. It has been a settlement for thousands of years, each new generation adding buildings, and leveling off old ones. A broch was discovered in 1975, which has been dated to 300 BC.

The site was first unearthed during construction work for airport improvements in the late 1970s. The site is managed by the Shetland Amenity Trust.

=== Jarlshof ===
Jarlshof (59.8692°N 1.2907°W) lies close to Old Scatness near the southern tip of the Shetland mainland and has been described as "one of the most remarkable archaeological sites ever excavated in the British Isles". It contains remains dating from 2500 BC up to the 17th century.

The Bronze Age settlers left evidence of several small oval houses with thick stone walls and various artefacts including a decorated bone object. The Iron Age ruins include several different types of structure including a broch and a defensive wall around the site. The Pictish period provides various works of art including a painted pebble and a symbol stone. The Viking-age ruins make up the largest such site visible anywhere in Britain and include a longhouse; excavations provided numerous tools and a detailed insight into life in Shetland at this time. The most visible structures on the site are the walls of the Scottish period fortified manor house, which inspired the name "Jarlshof" that first appears in The Pirate, an 1821 novel by Walter Scott. The site is in the care of Historic Scotland.

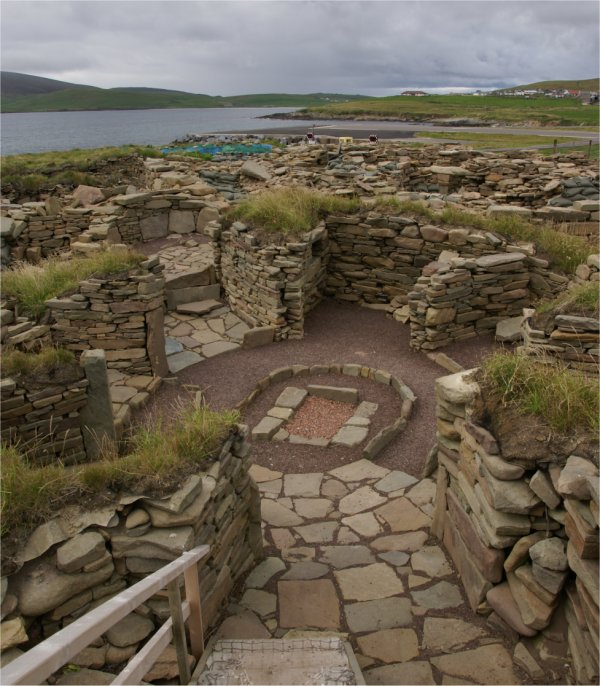
Old Scatness wheelhouse

== See also ==
- Prehistoric Orkney
- World Heritage Sites in Scotland
- List of UNESCO World Heritage Sites in the United Kingdom
- List of World Heritage Sites in Europe
