= Digital Design Studio =

The Digital Design Studio (DDS) was a research and postgraduate centre of the Glasgow School of Art, specialising in 3D digital visualisation and interaction technologies. In 2016 the Digital Design Studio became the School of Simulation and Visualisation and has now evolved into the School of Innovation and Technology.

== History ==
Launched in 1997, the DDS was based at House for an Art Lover in Bellahouston Park, Glasgow. In 2009, the DDS moved to a purpose-built facility at Pacific Quay, Glasgow, which included a high-definition 13mx8m stereo-projected display lab with full body and object tracking facilities.

The DDS attracted major research funding from industrial partners such as Ford Motor Company USA, QinetiQ, BAE Systems, Thales, Fisher Defence, BBC Scotland and Shed Media, and Historic Scotland. The DDS also has secured research grants from the EPSRC; and NESTA; AHRC; Scottish Enterprise; the EU FP6&7, and an RCUK Academic Fellowship.

In 2010, in collaboration with NHS Education for Scotland, the DDS set up two networked research centres located in Inverness and Stornoway. The goal of these centres to bring virtual medical training to areas of Scotland that struggle to gain access to traditional medical training resources. Each research centre was equipped with a passive stereo projection suite and a range of haptic devices in order to deliver medical training.

== Research specialisms and example projects ==
=== Medical Visualization ===
DDS has experience in medical visualization as evidenced by multiple research publications.

2D and 3D Dentistry project Funded by NHS Education for Scotland and in collaboration with the University of Glasgow and the Centre for Health Science, this project is in the process of producing detailed virtual anatomy of the human head and neck for anatomical training, a series of training videos for best practice in decontamination in dentistry. and modelling common disease processes. It also aims to address patient inequalities using a virtual patient training environment. This work was presented at the Association for Medical Education in Europe conference in 2010.

== Cultural Heritage and Urban Visualization ==
The DDS and Historic Scotland formed the Centre for Digital Documentation and Visualization (CDDV) which specialises in the precise documentation and 3D representation of heritage objects, architecture and environments using high resolution laser scanning technology and 3D visualization software.

=== Scottish 10 project ===
The Scottish 10 project aims to digitally document ten of the world's UNESCO World Heritage Sites, including all five of Scotland's sites. So far, a team from DDS and the CDDV have laser-scanned New Lanark and Neolithic Orkney in Scotland, and Mount Rushmore in the USA.

=== Glasgow Urban Model ===
DDS produced a detailed 3D model of Glasgow City Centre, the region surrounding Glasgow School of Art and the Clyde corridor. This model was commissioned by Glasgow City Council and was featured on the BBC news website.

=== British Empire Exhibition 1938 ===
As part of an AHRC-funded research project, DDS has created a 3D digital model of the 1938 British Empire Exhibition. There is a follow-up project which aims to link, in 3D space, the archive of materials on which the 3D models were based, to the models themselves and allow users to 'annotate' the models and digital archive.

=== Marine Visualization ===
Virtual Shipbuilding The DDS has run projects on virtual tools and visualisations for shipbuilding, both modern and relating to the history of Glasgow as a shipbuilding centre and marine visualisation.

=== Auralisation and sound ===
DDS is in partnership with ARUP Acoustics and working on various research projects related to sound and auralization, including SoundLab and modelling virtual concert halls for music rehearsal
