= List of World Heritage Sites in the United Kingdom =

The World Heritage Sites of the United Kingdom:

Cultural sites
Natural sites
Mixed sites

Names are abridged to fit on the map. Greater London is home to the cultural sites of Maritime Greenwich, Royal Botanical Gardens, Kew, Tower of London, and Palace of Westminster and Westminster Abbey including Saint Margaret's Church.
The World Heritage Sites of British Overseas Territories.

The United Nations Educational, Scientific and Cultural Organization (UNESCO) World Heritage Sites are places of importance to cultural or natural heritage as described in the UNESCO World Heritage Convention, established in 1972. Cultural heritage consists of monuments (such as architectural works, monumental sculptures, or inscriptions), groups of buildings, and sites (including archaeological sites). Natural features (consisting of physical and biological formations), geological and physiographical formations (including habitats of threatened species of animals and plants), and natural sites which are important from the point of view of science, conservation or natural beauty are defined as natural heritage. The United Kingdom ratified the convention on 29 May 1984, making its sites eligible for inclusion on the list.

There are 35 World Heritage Sites in the United Kingdom and the British Overseas Territories. Out of these sites, one site is located in both England and Scotland (the Frontiers of the Roman Empire), eighteen are exclusively in England, seven in Scotland, four in Wales, two in Northern Ireland, and one in each of the overseas territories of Bermuda, Gibraltar, the Pitcairn Islands, and Saint Helena. The first sites in the UK to be inscribed on the World Heritage List were Giant's Causeway and Causeway Coast; Durham Castle and Cathedral; Ironbridge Gorge; Studley Royal Park including the Ruins of Fountains Abbey; Stonehenge, Avebury and Associated Sites; and the Castles and Town Walls of King Edward in Gwynedd in 1986. The most recent site listed was Gracehill, as a part of transnational site Moravian Church Settlements, in 2024. Among the 35 sites, 29 are listed for their cultural significance, five for their natural significance, and one, St Kilda, for both. In addition, there are five sites on the tentative list. The UK has served on the World Heritage Committee once.

Three sites are transnational and are shared with other countries. Frontiers of the Roman Empire is shared with Germany, the Great Spa Towns of Europe with six European countries, and Moravian Church Settlements with Denmark, Germany, and the United States. In 2012, the World Heritage Committee added Liverpool– Maritime Mercantile City to the List of World Heritage in Danger, citing threats to the site's integrity from planned urban development projects. The site, originally listed in 2004 for its cultural significance, was eventually removed from the list in 2021, making it one of the only three sites in the world to have been removed from the World Heritage Site register.

== World Heritage Sites ==
UNESCO lists sites under ten criteria; each entry must meet at least one of the criteria. Criteria i to vi are cultural, and vii to x are natural.

* Transnational site

World Heritage Sites with location, year, UNESCO criteria, and other details
| Site | Image | Location | Year listed | UNESCO data | Description |
|---|---|---|---|---|---|
| Giant's Causeway and Causeway Coast | Coast with columnar basalt formations | County Antrim, Northern Ireland | 1986 | 369bis; vii, viii (natural) | The landscape with thousands of basalt columns was created by volcanic activity in the Tertiary, around 60 million years ago. The resulting land formations on one hand inspired legends of giants and on the other hand influenced the development of Earth sciences over the last 300 years. A minor boundary modification of the site took place in 2016. |
| Durham Castle and Cathedral | A medieval cathedral surrounded by trees | Durham, England | 1986 | 370bis; ii, iv, vi (cultural) | Durham Cathedral (pictured), built in the late 11th and early 12th centuries, is a prominent example of Norman architecture in England and vaulting of the cathedral was part of the advent of Gothic architecture. The cathedral houses relics of St Cuthbert and Bede and was a centre of a Benedictine monastic community. The Norman castle was the residence of the Durham prince-bishops. A minor boundary modification of the site took place in 2008. |
| Ironbridge Gorge | An iron bridge painted in red crossing a gorge. An inscription on the bridge states when it was constructed | Shropshire, England | 1986 | 371; i, ii, iv, vi (cultural) | In the early 18th century, Ironbridge Gorge was an early site of the Industrial Revolution. A blast furnace built by Abraham Darby I in Coalbrookdale was the first to use coke to smelt iron. Today, the industrial heritage is well preserved, with mines, manufacturing plants, workers houses, and transport systems. The Iron Bridge (pictured), constructed in 1779 by Abraham Darby III, was world's first metal bridge. |
| Studley Royal Park including the Ruins of Fountains Abbey | Ruins of a medieval monastery | North Yorkshire, England | 1986 | 372bis; i, iv (cultural) | The estate comprises 18th century landscaped gardens, historic buildings, water features, and parks. The garden is an outstanding example of an English garden. Buildings in the park include the ruins of the 12th century Fountains Abbey (a former Cistercian monastery, pictured) and the Victorian Gothic St Mary's church. A minor boundary modification of the site took place in 2012. |
| Stonehenge, Avebury and Associated Sites | Stonehenge, a prehistoric assembly of large stones in a megalithic structure | Wiltshire, England | 1986 | 373bis; i, ii, iii (cultural) | This site comprises a series of megalithic monuments that were created by Neolithic and Bronze Age societies around 3700 to 1600 BCE. Stonehenge (pictured) is the world's most architecturally sophisticated prehistoric stone circle while Avebury has the world's largest stone circle and Silbury Hill, a large artificial mound. The sites provide an insight into the culture, technology, and astronomical knowledge of the societies that created them. A minor boundary modification of the site took place in 2008. |
| Castles and Town Walls of King Edward in Gwynedd | Medieval stone castle walls with towers and a moat | Four sites in north Wales | 1986 | 374; i, iii, iv (cultural) | During the reign of Edward I of England (1272–1307), a series of castles were constructed in Wales with the purpose of subduing the population and establishing English colonies in the region. Four castles are listed: Beaumaris (pictured), Caernarfon, Conwy, and Harlech. These castles are considered the pinnacle of military architecture by military historians. |
| St Kilda | Island coast with cliffs and ruins of stone buildings | Outer Hebrides, Scotland | 1986 | 387ter; iii, v, vii, ix, x (mixed) | The remote archipelago of volcanic origin was shaped by weathering and glaciation that produced a dramatic landscape with high cliffs. The islands are important habitat for seabirds such as the northern gannet, Atlantic puffin, and northern fulmar, who nest there in large numbers. Initially listed for its natural significance, the site was expanded in 2004 and 2005 to account for its cultural significance. The islands were inhabited for at least two millennia, with people subsisting in extreme climate on products of birds and sheep farming. Their activities resulted in a specific cultural landscape with houses, enclosures, and storage structures. The last permanent inhabitants left the islands in 1930. |
| Blenheim Palace | A large palace from the early 18th century | Oxfordshire, England | 1987 | 425; ii, iv (cultural) | The residence of John Churchill, 1st Duke of Marlborough, was designed by architects John Vanbrugh and Nicholas Hawksmoor in the early 18th century. The associated park was landscaped by Capability Brown. The palace celebrated victory over the French and is significant for establishing English romantic architecture as a separate entity from French classical architecture. It was also the home of Sir Winston Churchill. |
| Palace of Westminster and Westminster Abbey including Saint Margaret's Church | Palace of Westminster, a large neo-Gothic building with a tower along the river | Greater London, England | 1987 | 426bis; i, ii, iv (cultural) | The buildings comprising this site are deeply connected to the British monarchy. The medieval Westminster Abbey, with representative stages of the Gothic architecture, is the place where British monarchs are crowned, married, and buried. The Westminster Palace (pictured), the seat of the Parliament, was rebuilt after 1840 in the neo-Gothic style, with the iconic Big Ben (Elizabeth Tower). St Margaret's Church is the parish church and was built in the Perpendicular Gothic style. |
| City of Bath | Roman baths surrounded by buildings from later periods | Somerset, England | 1987 | 428; i, ii, iv (cultural) | Bath was founded in the 1st century CE under the Romans who used it as a spa. The Roman Baths (pictured) are still preserved. It was a centre for wool industry in the Middle Ages; Bath Abbey dates to that period. In the 18th and 19th centuries, the city was developed by Georgian architects who constructed architectural ensembles such as the Circus and the Royal Crescent. Bath is also a part of a separate transnational site The Great Spa Towns of Europe. |
| Frontiers of the Roman Empire* | A Roman stone wall across a rural landscape | Sites in England and Scotland | 1987 | 430ter; ii, ii, iv (cultural) | Limes was a defense system, delimiting the borders of the Roman Empire that reached its peak in the 2nd century CE. Today, there are remains of the walls, forts, ditches, watchtowers, and civilian settlements. Hadrian's Wall (pictured), constructed c. 122 CE, was listed in 1987. The Upper Germanic-Rhaetian Limes in today's Germany was added to the site in 2005 and the Antonine Wall, the construction of which started in 142 CE, was added in 2008. These three fortification systems demonstrate the sophistication of Roman military engineering and were influential in the following historical periods. |
| Henderson Island | A large seabird flying above a beach on a tropical island | Pitcairn Islands | 1988 | 487; vii, x (natural) | The largest of the Pitcairn Islands is an uplifted coral atoll in the South Pacific. Due to being unsuitable for agriculture and with little fresh water, it has remained uninhabited and thus largely untouched by human impact. For a tropical island of its size, it has a remarkable biological diversity, with numerous endemic animal and plant species, including four species of land birds. It is also an important nesting site for seabirds. The island provides insight into evolution and speciation of flora and fauna in an island environment. |
| Tower of London | The White Tower, a castle tower with four keeps at the corners, a UK flag, and fortifications around | Greater London, England | 1988 | 488; ii, iv (cultural) | Commissioned by William the Conqueror following the Norman conquest of England, the Tower of London is a symbol of power and an example of Norman military architecture that spread across England. Additions in the following centuries made the castle one of the most influential buildings of its kind in England. The White Tower, the centre of the fortress, is pictured. |
| Canterbury Cathedral, St Augustine's Abbey, and St Martin's Church | A large cathedral mainly in the Gothic style | Kent, England | 1988 | 496; i, ii, vi (cultural) | St Martin's Church is the oldest church in England. The church and St Augustine's Abbey, today in ruins, were founded during the early stages of the introduction of Christianity to the Anglo-Saxons, in the late 6th century. The cathedral (pictured) exhibits Romanesque and early Gothic architecture, and is the seat of the Church of England. It saw partial rebuilding after a fire in 1174. |
| Old and New Towns of Edinburgh | Stone castle above the city | Edinburgh, Scotland | 1995 | 728; ii, iv (cultural) | Edinburgh, the capital of Scotland since the 15th century, comprises two distinct districts. The medieval Old Town located on a ridge dominated by the Edinburgh Castle (pictured) which preserves the old street layout. Important historical buildings include St Giles' Cathedral and Holyrood Palace. The New Town was built in the Georgian era in the 18th and 19th centuries. The carefully planned layout of the urban ensembles had major influence on urban planning in Europe and beyond, |
| Gough and Inaccessible Islands | Island with sparse vegetation, some snow on the ground, and mountains in the background | Saint Helena, Ascension and Tristan da Cunha | 1995 | 740bis; vii, x (natural) | The two islands in the Southern Atlantic Ocean are eroded remains of ancient volcanoes. They represent some of the least disturbed cool temperate island ecosystems in that part of the world and are especially important for seabirds that nest there in colonies. There are also some endemic species of land birds and numerous endemic plant species. Gough Island Wildlife Reserve was independently listed in 1995, Inaccessible Island was added in 2004. |
| Maritime Greenwich | Two 18th-century buildings with domes | Greater London, England | 1997 | 795; i, ii, iv, vi (cultural) | Greenwich has some of the first examples of Palladian architecture in England, including the Queen's House by Inigo Jones, and buildings designed by Christopher Wren (the Old Royal Naval College pictured). The area is also significant for the Royal Observatory where the understanding of astronomy and navigation were developed, with Greenwich Mean Time and Greenwich meridian becoming established as world standards. |
| Heart of Neolithic Orkney | Archaeological site with remains of dwellings with walls made of stacks of slabs of stones | Orkney, Scotland | 1999 | 514bis; i, ii, iii, iv (cultural) | The site comprises four groups of monuments and archaeological sites related to a Neolithic culture dating to around 5,000 years ago. Skara Brae (pictured) is the best preserved Neolithic settlement in northern Europe. Other sites are Maeshowe, a chambered cairn and passage grave, and two megalithic monuments, the Ring of Brodgar and the Standing Stones of Stenness. |
| Historic Town of St George and Related Fortifications, Bermuda | A look from above at a coastal fortification with some houses more inland | Bermuda | 2000 | 983; iv (cultural) | St. George's, founded in 1612, is the oldest surviving English settlement in the Americas and Britain's main New World naval base after the American Revolution. Between the 17th and 20th centuries, the town fortifications were repeatedly being reconstructed in line with the advances in artillery development. |
| Blaenavon Industrial Landscape | Mining museum building from above | Blaenavon, Wales | 2000 | 984; iii, iv (cultural) | In the 19th century, Wales was the world's foremost producer of iron and coal. Blaenavon is an example of the landscape created by the industrial processes associated with the production of these materials. The site includes quarries, public buildings, workers' housing, and a railway. |
| New Lanark | A series of multi-storey stone buildings along a stream | South Lanarkshire, Scotland | 2001 | 429rev; ii, iv, vi (cultural) | The village was founded in 1785 by Robert Owen, a textile manufacturer, social reformer, and founder of utopian socialism, to house workers in the cotton mills. The village became a model for industrial communities in the 19th and 20th centuries and was a precursor to the garden city movement. |
| Saltaire | Factory building along a river | West Yorkshire, England | 2001 | 1028; ii, iv (cultural) | Saltaire was founded by Titus Salt as a model village for his workers at cotton mills. The village comprises factory buildings (Salts Mill pictured), housing, and public buildings. It represents an example of 19th-century philanthropic paternalism and was influential in the garden city movement. |
| Dorset and East Devon Coast | Cliffs facing the sea | Devon and Dorset, England | 2001 | 1029; viii (natural) | The site spans 185 million years of geological history, coastal erosion having exposed an almost continuous sequence of rock formation covering the Triassic, Jurassic and Cretaceous periods. Fossils include marine and terrestrial vertebrates and invertebrates. The findings in the last 300 years have greatly influenced the development of palaentology, geology, and geomorphology. |
| Derwent Valley Mills | A factory building in red brick | Derbyshire, England | 2001 | 1030; ii, iv (cultural) | Derwent Valley was the area where Richard Arkwright developed a water-powered spinning frame for cotton mills in 1771. This led to the development of the modern factory system. This transformed a previously rural landscape with construction of factory buildings and housing for workers and managers. This approach became a model for factories in the following centuries worldwide. |
| Royal Botanic Gardens, Kew | Flowers in front of the glass house | Greater London, England | 2003 | 1084; ii, iv (cultural) | The gardens, founded in 1759, were influential in the development of botany, economic botany, ecology, and plant diversity. They host extensive botanical collections of both conserved and living plants, associated with the economic exchange throughout the world. They are known both for their landscape design and architectural features, including an orangery, follies, and iron-framed glasshouses (the Palm House pictured). |
| Cornwall and West Devon Mining Landscape | Ruins of two stone buildings on a cliff close to the sea | Cornwall and Devon, England | 2006 | 1215; ii, iii, iv (cultural) | Tin and copper mining in Devon and Cornwall boomed in the 18th and 19th centuries, and at its peak the area produced two-thirds of the world's copper. The techniques and technology involved in deep mining developed in Devon and Cornwall were used around the world. The mining industry transformed the landscape and today numerous sites are still visible, including remains of mines, engineering houses, railways, harbours, as well as newly founded towns and villages. Engine houses at Botallack Mine are pictured. |
| Pontcysyllte Aqueduct and Canal | A boat on the aqueduct on masonry pillars and iron arches | Wrexham, Wales Shropshire, England | 2009 | 1303; i, ii, iv (cultural) | The artificial waterway is an important feature of civil engineering from the early 19th century and was constructed to further the Industrial Revolution. The aqueduct, a monumental yet elegant construction, was designed by Thomas Telford. It is set on masonry pillars and has iron arches. The canal illustrates the ways technology was used to overcome the challenges of a difficult terrain. |
| The Forth Bridge | A large steel bridge, painted red, crossing a river | Edinburgh and Fife, Scotland | 2015 | 1485; i, iv (cultural) | The cantilever railway bridge, crossing the Firth of Forth, opened in 1890 and was at that point the bridge with the longest span in the world (541 m (1,775 ft)). It is made of mild steel, which at the time of its construction was a relatively novel material. The bridge represents an important engineering achievement of the period when rail transport was transforming the world. |
| Gorham's Cave Complex | A cave just above the sea level | Gibraltar | 2016 | 1500; iii (cultural) | The four caves at the eastern side of the Rock of Gibraltar provide evidence of Neanderthal occupation at different times over a period of more than 100,000 years. Findings provide extensive insight into the life of these people, including the food resources they were exploiting and possible indications of abstract art, with rock carvings dated to more than 39,000 years ago. Later archaeological layers indicate the occupation by early modern human populations. |
| The English Lake District | Landscape with hills, a lake, and a village | Cumbria, England | 2017 | 422rev; ii, v, vi (cultural) | The cultural landscape of the Lake District has been shaped by the glaciers during the Ice Age and later by agro-pastoral communities. There are mountains, lakes, gardens, grand houses, and parks. The landscape was celebrated during the picturesque and romantic movements in visual arts and literature from the 18th century on. The area around Helvellyn is pictured. |
| Jodrell Bank Observatory | A large radio telescope | Cheshire, England | 2019 | 1594; i, ii, iv, vi (cultural) | The astronomical observatory was founded in 1945. In its early years, it marked the transition from optical to radio astronomy which in turn provided new insight into the universe. The observatory has several telescopes (the largest of them, the Lovell Telescope is pictured). It was influential in studies of cosmic rays, quasars, meteorites, spacecraft tracking, and quantum optics. It remains operational today. |
| The Great Spa Towns of Europe* | Roman bath with columns and statues | Somerset, England | 2021 | 1613; ii, iii (cultural) | This transnational site comprises 11 spa towns in seven European countries where mineral waters were used for healing and therapeutic purposes before the development of industrial medication in the 19th century. Bath (Roman Baths pictured) is listed in the UK. |
| The Slate Landscape of Northwest Wales | A transporter system to move slate down a hill | Several sites in Wales | 2021 | 1633; ii, iv (cultural) | This site comprises six complexes of mines and quarries where slate was initially produced during the Roman times and then from the late 18th century on an industrial scale. In the late 19th century, the region produced a third of the world's supply of slate for roof tiles and architectural slabs, and the use of slate influenced the development of Georgian architecture. Technological solutions developed here were later applied to other slate mines worldwide. A transporter incline from the Dinorwic quarry is pictured. |
| The Flow Country | Landscape with peat bogs, standing water, and some hills in the background | Caithness, Sutherland, Scotland | 2024 | 1722; ix (natural) | The site comprises seven areas in northern Scotland with extensive blanket bog, a landscape that has been actively forming by accumulation of peat since the end of the Last Glacial Period over last 9,000 years. It supports diverse bird communities and is important in studies of peat bog ecosystems. |
| Moravian Church Settlements* | A side view of a church building with a dark facade | County Antrim, Northern Ireland | 2024 | 1468bis; iii, iv (cultural) | The settlements of the Moravian Church, a Protestant denomination, from the second half of the 18th century are planned cities, reflecting the egalitarian philosophy of the community. They share similar urban layouts, including open and green spaces, a congregational building, cemetery, sanctuary, and houses for communal living, separated by age, gender, and marital status. Christiansfeld in Denmark has been listed as a World Heritage Site in 2015. The site was extended in 2024 to include the Historic Moravian Bethlehem District in the United States, Herrnhut in Germany, and Gracehill in the United Kingdom (the church building pictured). |

== Tentative list ==
In addition to sites inscribed on the World Heritage List, member states can maintain a list of tentative sites that they may consider for nomination. Nominations for the World Heritage List are only accepted if the site was previously listed on the tentative list. United Kingdom maintains five properties on its tentative list.

Tentative sites
| Site | Image | Location | Year listed | UNESCO criteria | Description |
|---|---|---|---|---|---|
| City of York: historic urban core | A street with old houses and a medieval cathedral in the background | North Yorkshire, England | 2023 | i, ii, iii, iv, vi (cultural) | York was founded by the Romans and developed through Anglo-Saxon, Viking, Norman, and subsequent periods, each leaving its mark. York Minster, the medieval cathedral (pictured in the background), is known for its stained glass windows, including the Great East Window. Through history, the city was home to numerous scientists, artists, innovators, and civil rights campaigners. |
| Birkenhead Park, the pioneering People's Park | A large structure with columns and arches that serves as an entrance to a public park | Merseyside, England | 2023 | i, ii, iv (cultural) | The park was created in the 1840s by an influential horticulture designer Joseph Paxton. From its inception, the park was intended for all layers of society to enjoy. It addressed the public health needs of the population of an industrialized city and provide a template for public parks both in England and worldwide. The Grand Entrance is pictured. |
| East Atlantic Flyway: England East Coast Wetlands | Map showing parts of Europe and Africa with bird migration routes marked | several sites in England | 2023 | x (natural) | The East Atlantic Flyway (a map pictured) is a network of routes used by more than 150 species of migratory birds that move between the nesting and wintering grounds spanning between the Arctic and South Africa. The proposed site comprises a series of protected areas, including wetlands, mudflats, coasts, and marine conservation zones. |
| Little Cayman Marine Parks and Protected Areas | A satellite image of an Caribbean island | Cayman Islands | 2023 | vii, ix, x (natural) | The smallest and the least developed of the three Cayman Islands is a peak of an underwater mountain range and is located near the Cayman Trench. It has several representative habitats of the Caribbean, with mangroves, seagrass meadows, wetlands, and coral reefs. It is exceptionally rich in biodiversity, comparing to other areas in the Caribbean. The sea has some of the last spawning grounds of the Nassau grouper, a critically endangered fish species. |
| Mousa, Old Scatness and Jarlshof: the Zenith of Iron Age Shetland | A circular drystone structure with some tourists around | Shetland, Scotland | 2023 | iii, iv, v (cultural) | This nomination comprises three representative archaeological site from the British Iron Age, with the oldest structures from c. 400 BCE to the more recent dating after 500 CE. Dry stone constructions include broches (Broch of Mousa pictured), wheelhouses, and roundhouses. They demonstrate how the architecture has evolved through time and how people developed a proto-urban society in a difficult and gradually deteriorating insular environment. |

== Former UNESCO World Heritage Site ==
World Heritage Sites
| Site | Image | Location | Year listed | UNESCO data | Description |
|---|---|---|---|---|---|
| Liverpool – Maritime Mercantile City | Liverpool waterfront with several prominent buildings | Merseyside, England | 2004 | 1150; ii, iii, iv (cultural) | In the 18th and 19th centuries, Liverpool was one of the largest ports in the world. Its global connections helped sustain the British Empire, it was a major port involved in the slave trade until its abolition in 1807, and a departure point for emigrants to North America. The docks were the site of innovations in construction and dock management. The site was listed as endangered in 2012 and removed from the World Heritage List in 2021, as the construction of new buildings in the area had destroyed the "outstanding universal value" of Liverpool's waterfront. |

== See also ==
- List of World Heritage Sites in Scotland
- List of World Heritage Sites in Wales
- Tourism in the United Kingdom
