= Tofts Ness =

Prehistoric settlement on Sanday, Orkney, Scotland

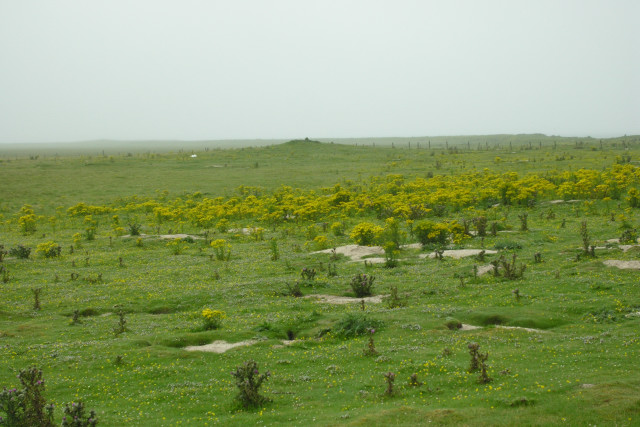
- Cairns on Tofts Ness peninsula, Sanday
- Interactive map of Tofts Ness
- Type: Prehistoric settlement
- Periods: Neolithic, Bronze Age, Iron Age
- Location: Sanday, Orkney

Scheduled monument
- Reference no.: SM5080

Tofts Ness is a peninsula located on the north-east tip of the island of Sanday in Orkney, Scotland. It encompasses a prehistoric site which shows evidence of human occupation beginning in the late Neolithic Age and continuing through the Iron Age. The scheduled monument consists of mounds, cairns, enclosures, ancient soils and structural remains. Tofts Ness is also the location of multiple shipwrecks.

== Description ==
Tofts Ness is situated on a peninsula at the north-east end of the island of Sanday, in Orkney, Scotland. The ancient site consists of a vast complex of prehistoric earthen banks, cairns, enclosures, mounds and structural remains. There are over 300 mounds and cairns; Many of the mounds are probably burial monuments. Of the larger mounds, one is possibly a broch.

Excavation and geophysical survey work conducted at the site in the 1980s revealed that Tofts Ness was originally a settlement, probably a farm and/or a kelp working complex. There were two primary phases of occupation at Tofts Ness, the first dating from the Neolithic to the early Bronze Age, and the second from the late Bronze Age to the early Iron Age. During excavation, a round house was uncovered, along with a connecting structure, both surrounded by soil showing evidence of cultivation.

At the shoreline of Tofts Ness, two unroofed stone buildings and two enclosures have been discovered, visible on aerial photography. (Note: An aerial photograph of the site can be found at Historic Environment Scotlant–Canmore: https://canmore.org.uk/file/image/1543508) The first unroofed building measures about 10m by 5m, and is divided into three compartments. The second unroofed building adjoins the first structure and is similar in size and number of compartments. Both enclosures are aligned with the shoreline and are divided internally by walls or earthen banks. Tofts Ness was first scheduled as a monument by Historic Environment Scotland in 1991. The original protected area has been enlarged to cover additional important remains.

== History ==
=== Settlement ===
In the late Neolithic and early Bronze Age, the people who lived at Tofts Ness were clearing vegetation and cultivating the poor soil by applying manure and ash. They cleared stones to create tillable land and would move the rocks onto clearance cairns. They used a knowledgeable system of manuring by mixing midden with ash and applying it to the sandy soil. The people of Tofts Ness cultivated barley, and raised livestock, including sheep, cattle and pits. They supplemented their diets with fish, shellfish, seabirds and edible plants. The site was last occupied during the Early Iron Age.

=== Shipwrecks ===
The Taindale, a brig with a cargo of flax and lumber was stranded on Tofts Ness on 19 November 1778. It is unknown whether this ship was successfully recovered.

The Ann & Christian was wrecked on or near Tofts Ness on 17 February 17, 1771. It contained cargo of coal.

The Rinaldo, a 400-ton, fully-rigged ship, containing a cargo of flax, hemp and linseed, was stranded on Tofts Ness on 14 January 1810. It is unknown whether the ship was recovered at the site.

The Friende Veni, a Galiot, with a cargo of lumber and deals, was wrecked on Tofts Ness on 18 April 1811.

The Express, a schooner sailing from Lerwick to Belfast, was wrecked on Tofts Ness on 25 February 1835. The crew and some of the cargo was saved.

The Gunhild, a 955-ton wood barque from Norway, was wrecked on the south end of Tofts Ness on 15 April 1888. There was a crew of sixteen and the Captain was G. Anderssen. The ship contained timber.

The Frederic Eugene, a 546-ton wood barque, was wrecked on 24 June 1891. The cargo contained battens and iron tubes. The ship had sailed from Hernosand, Sweden and its destination was Brazil.

== See also ==
- Prehistoric Orkney
- Timeline of prehistoric Scotland
- Scheduled monuments in Orkney
