= Prehistoric Orkney =

Overview of the prehistoric period on the Orkney Islands, Scotland

Prehistoric Orkney refers only to the prehistory of the Orkney archipelago of Scotland that begins with human occupation. (The islands' history before human occupation is part of the geology of Scotland.) Although some records referring to Orkney survive that were written during the Roman invasions of Scotland, "prehistory" in northern Scotland is defined as lasting until the start of Scotland's Early Historic Period (around AD 600).

There are numerous important prehistoric remains in Orkney, especially from the Neolithic period. Four of these remains today constitute a World Heritage Site. There are diverse reasons for the abundance of the archaeological record. The sandstone bedrock provides easily workable stone materials and the wind-blown sands have helped preserve several sites. The relative lack of industrialisation and the low incidence of ploughing have also helped to preserve these ancient monuments. In addition, local tradition hints at both fear and veneration of these ancient structures (perhaps inherited from the Norse period of occupation), and these attitudes may have helped prevent human interference with their structural integrity.

Prehistory is conventionally divided into a number of shorter periods, but differentiating these various eras of human history is a complex task – their boundaries are uncertain, and the changes between them are gradual. A number of the sites span long periods of time, and, in particular, the distinctions between the Neolithic and the later periods are not clear cut. However, in general, the Paleolithic lasted until the retreat of the ice, the Mesolithic until the adoption of farming and the Neolithic until metalworking commenced The Neolithic period's extraordinary wealth of structures is not matched by the remains from earlier periods, in which the evidence of human occupation is sparse or non-existent – nor is it matched by remains from the later Bronze Age, which provides a relative dearth of evidence. However, the subsequent Iron Age supported a return to monumental building projects, especially brochs.

Formal excavations were first recorded in the late 18th century. Over time, investigators' understanding of the structures they uncovered progressed—from little more than folklore in the beginning, to modern archaeological science today.

The sites discussed in this article are found on the Orkney Mainland unless otherwise stated.

== Paleolithic ==
No evidence of an occupation of Scotland by archaic humans during the Early Paleolithic or Middle Paleolithic has been found. For much of the Last Glacial Period, Orkney was covered by the British-Irish Ice Sheet, precluding human habitation. Late Upper Palaeolithic stone tools of the Ahrensburgian culture have been found in Stronsay and Brodgar on mainland Orkney, suggesting the islands have been inhabited around or prior to 8000 BC, perhaps as early as 11,000 BC. At this time, Britain was still connected to the continent via Doggerland. The earliest inhabitants were mobile hunter-gatherers who may have only infrequently visited the islands.

== Mesolithic ==
Rising sea levels during the early Holocene saw large areas of Orkney submerge, dividing into two islands by 8000 BC, and resembling the modern archipelago by 6000 BC. During the immediate post-glacial period, Orkney is thought to have been heavily wooded with hazel, birch and willow, with lesser amounts of birch and scots pine.

The very limited archaeological record of this period provides scant evidence of Mesolithic life – in Orkney in particular and in Scotland north of Inverness in general. "Lithic scatter" sites at Seatter, South Ettit, Wideford Hill, Valdigar and Loch of Stenness have produced small polished stone tools and chippings. A charred hazelnut shell, recovered during the excavations at Longhowe in Tankerness in 2007, has been dated to 6820-6660 BC. However, there is no evidence to suggest whether or not these sites were in year-round occupation and no Mesolithic burial sites have been uncovered anywhere in Scotland to date.

A recently excavated site on Stronsay has produced a thousand pieces of flint and what may be evidence of a temporary camp. With a tentative dating of 7000 BC or older it may prove to be the oldest settlement site found so far on Orkney.

About 6000 BC the Storegga Slides off the coast of Norway created a tsunami that reached 25 metres (82 ft) above normal high tides in places. Evidence of widespread coastal inundations from a wave 8 metres (26 ft) high has been found as far south as Fife and the impact on shore-dwelling mesolithic societies in Orkney would have been considerable.

== Neolithic ==
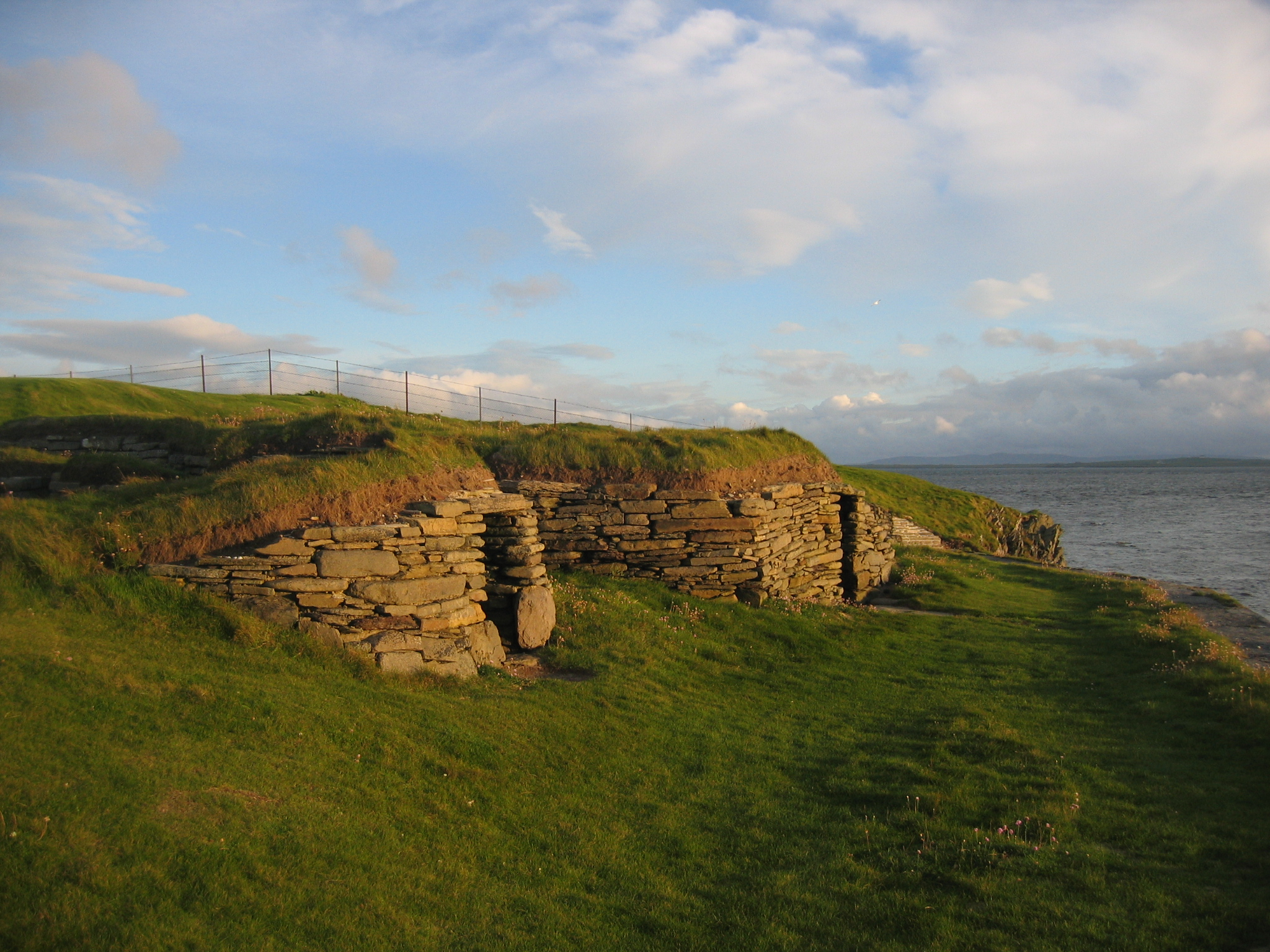
The seaward walls of Knap of Howar

The assemblage of monumental Neolithic structures in Orkney is without parallel in the United Kingdom, and the Orkney Mainland provides an entire landscape of features from this period. During this time, complex new societies came to the fore that were a radical departure from the earlier hunter-gatherers and which were capable of creating substantial structures. The Neolithic in Scotland lasted from approximately 4000 to 2200 BC and Orkney as a whole has nearly 3,000 identified Neolithic sites all told. British archaeologists have often interpreted this era as having two distinct phases; the Earlier Neolithic dominated by regional styles of pottery and architecture followed by a relatively abrupt change into the Later Neolithic characterised by new traditions found throughout the British Isles that incorporate structures on a grander scale. In the Orcadian context, there are definite developments during the Neolithic, but the changes are gradual and tend to build on earlier ideas rather than appearing to form two distinct periods.

The great Orcadian Neolithic monuments were constructed almost a millennium before the sarsen stones of Stonehenge were erected. At one time it was believed that this flowering of culture was essentially peripheral and that its origins were to be found to the south on mainland Great Britain. However, recently discovered evidence shows that Orkney was the starting place for much of the megalithic culture, including styles of architecture and pottery, that developed much later in the southern British Isles.

=== Early dwellings and chambered cairns ===
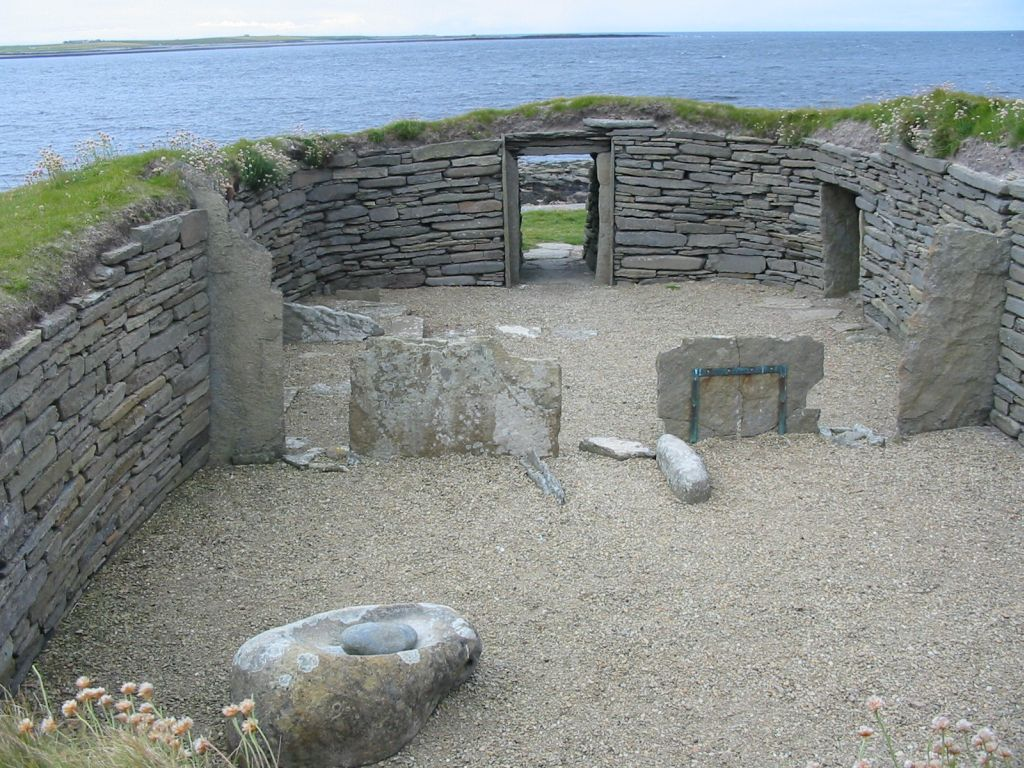
The interior of Knap of Howar

Knap of Howar Neolithic farmstead is probably the oldest preserved house in northern Europe. Situated on the island of Papa Westray (which may have been combined with nearby Westray in the early Neolithic), the farmstead consists of two adjacent rounded rectangular thick-walled buildings with low doorways linked by a passageway. This structure was inhabited for 900 years from 3700 BC but was evidently built on the site of an even older settlement. Unstan ware pottery pieces were found on the site, which was only discovered in the 1920s when this part of the coastline was exposed by gales and tides.

The Barnhouse Settlement is a cluster of at least fifteen buildings, including one that may have been used for communal gatherings, occupied between 3200 and 2950 BC. The design of the houses, which were built above ground level, includes a central hearth, recessed box beds and stone dressers. There is a network of stone drains leading to a common ditch. Pottery of the grooved ware type, flints and stone tools have been found, as well as three flakes of pitchstone thought to have come from the Isle of Arran.

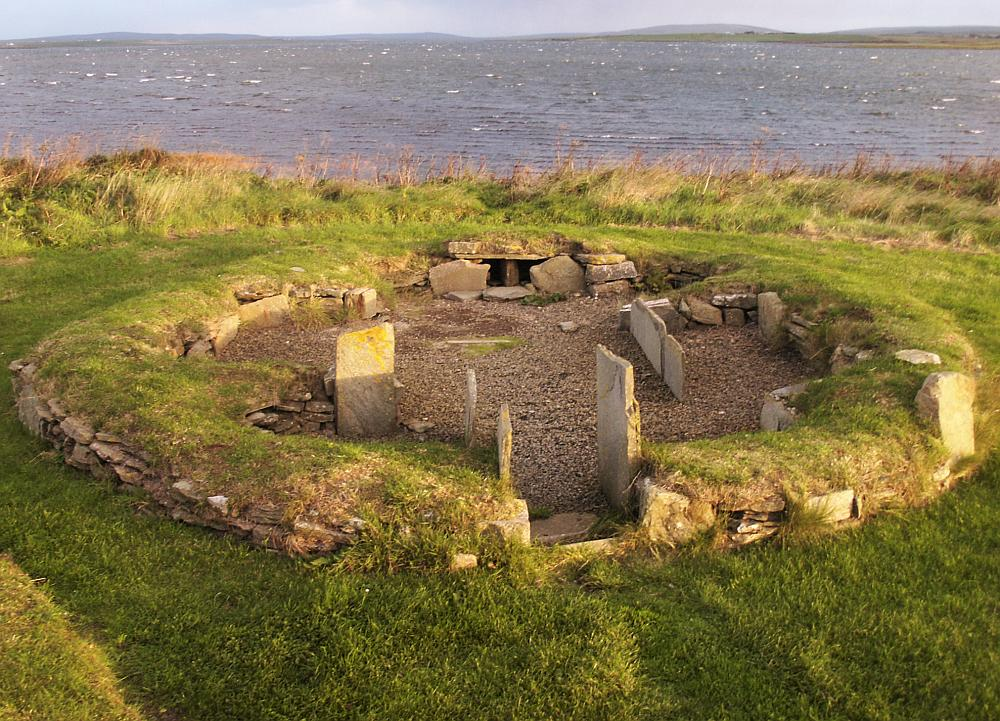
House 3 in the Barnhouse Settlement, with Loch of Harray beyond

Skara Brae consists of ten clustered houses and is northern Europe's most complete Neolithic village. Occupied between 3100–2500 BC the houses are similar to those at Barnhouse, but they are linked by common passages and were built into a large midden containing ash, bones, shells, stone and organic waste. Only the roofs, which were probably supported by timber or whalebone, would have been visible from the outside. In each case the stone dressers were erected so that they dominated the view on entering the house through the low doors and there are elaborate carvings of unknown meaning on some of the stones in the houses and passages. A variety of bone beads, pins and pendants and four carved stone balls were also discovered at the site, which was only revealed after a storm in the winter of 1850 ripped away the grass from a covering sand dune. The existing ruins mostly belong to a secondary phase of building with the foundations of the first phase largely hidden from view.

There are two main types of chambered cairn on these islands: the Orkney/Cromarty type with a burial chamber approached through a low passage and usually divided into "stalls" by upright stone slabs, and the Maeshowe type (see below), which is a later development with a cruciform layout and an elongated passage.

The island of Rousay has a substantial number of prehistoric sites (see also below), including fifteen of such tombs, resulting it becoming known as the "Egypt of the north". Midhowe Chambered Cairn on the western shore of the island is the finest example. The exterior walls of this large stone burial mound survive to well over head-height and the constituent stones are arranged in a herring bone pattern. The original interior chambers were simple in style and dived into two or three stalls, but were later enlarged to include twelve separate compartments set along a 23 metres (75 ft) passageway. There are other substantial tombs at Blackhammer, Taversoe Tuick, and Yarso. Enlargement and elaboration of burial cairns as the Neolithic progressed is a theme found throughout Scotland, and the move from simple and private tombs to larger structures, some with entrances apparently designed for public gatherings may also be linked to the emergence of landscape-scale ceremonial complexes. Other chambered tombs of significance include those at Unstan and Bookan on the Mainland and Holm of Papa Westray.

Links of Noltland, a site on the north coast of the island of Westray has been excavated since the 1980s. In 2009 a lozenge-shaped figurine was discovered, which may have been carved 2500-3000 BC and is believed to be the earliest representation of a human face ever found in Scotland. The face has two dots for eyes, heavy brows and an oblong nose and a pattern of hatches on the body could represent clothing. Archaeologist Richard Strachan described it as a find of "astonishing rarity".

=== The Heart of Neolithic Orkney ===
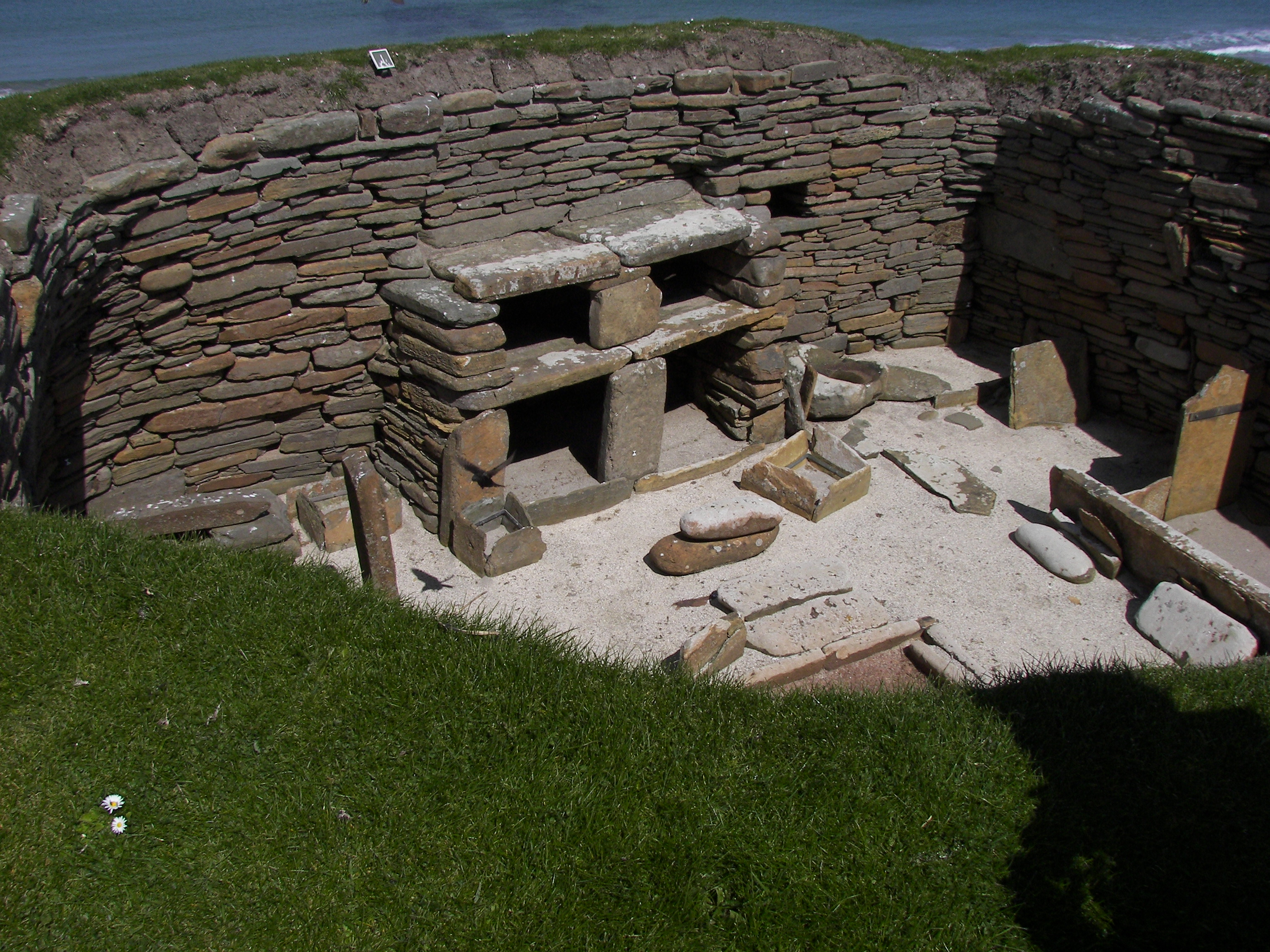
A stone dresser at Skara Brae.

Skara Brae, Maeshowe, the Ring of Brodgar and the Stones of Stenness together form the Heart of Neolithic Orkney UNESCO World Heritage Site in the western part of the Orkney Mainland and which was inscribed in 1999. This small area has provided a rich archaeological heritage in a location that is relatively remote from both the main centres of population in Scotland and from more densely populated parts of Europe. However, it would be a mistake to imagine that because Orkney is so placed today that this was always so. There is a substantial amount of evidence that suggests that a variety of the smaller islands in the British Isles developed an advanced society in the Neolithic that took several centuries longer to develop on the mainland of Great Britain. It is also clear that whilst the flow of ideas and technologies in Britain has often been from the south to the north, that at this time, it is evident that Orkney played a significant role in the development of British Neolithic culture.

There is also the possibility that tribal differences were part of the Neolithic cultural landscape. Unstan Ware pottery is associated with small settlements like Knap of Howar, and stalled tombs such as Midhowe. Grooved Ware pottery on the other hand tends to be associated with larger 'village' settlements like Skara Brae and Barnhouse, and with Maes Howe style tombs.

==== Maeshowe ====
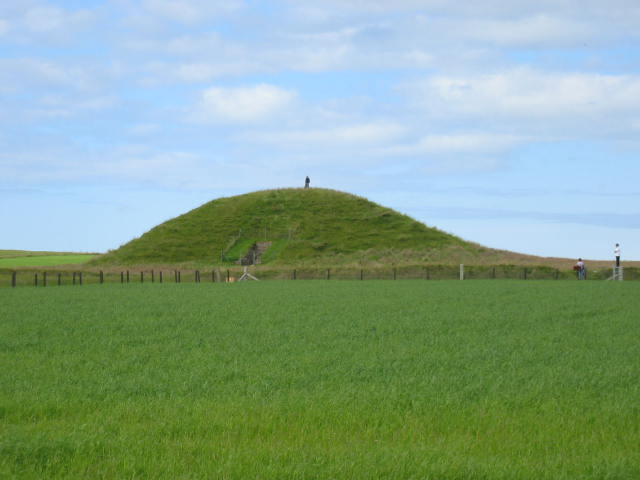
Maeshowe chambered cairn

Dating from about 3000 BC, Maeshowe is a large chambered cairn and passage grave. "Howe" as an element in a name, from the Old Norse word haugr meaning mound or barrow, is common throughout Orkney. The grass mound hides a complex of passages and chambers built of carefully crafted slabs of sandstone that in scale and accomplishment has few equals in prehistoric Europe. It is aligned so that the rear wall of its central chamber, a rough cube of 4.5 cubic metres (5.9 cu yd) is illuminated on the winter solstice. It gives its name to the Maeshowe type of chambered cairns, (see above) that include other significant sites such as Cuween Hill, Quanterness and Wideford Hill, and at Quoyness on Sanday.

After it fell into disuse during the Bronze Age, Maeshowe was re-opened and used centuries later by Vikings from about the 9th to the 12th centuries AD. The Norsemen left a series of runic inscriptions on the stone walls of the chamber, some of which were left by a group of crusaders in the winter of 1153–54. Over thirty individual inscriptions remain, one of the largest such collections in Europe.

==== Ring of Brodgar ====
The Ring of Brodgar is a henge and stone circle 104 metres (341 ft) in diameter, originally made of 60 stones (of which only 27 remain standing) set within a circular ditch up to 3 metres (9.8 ft) deep and 10 metres (33 ft) wide. Some of the remaining stones are 4.5 metres (15 ft) high and it has been estimated that the ditch alone took 80,000 man-hours to construct. The ring stands on a small isthmus between the Lochs of Stenness and Harray and it is generally thought to have been erected between 2500 BC and 2000 BC.

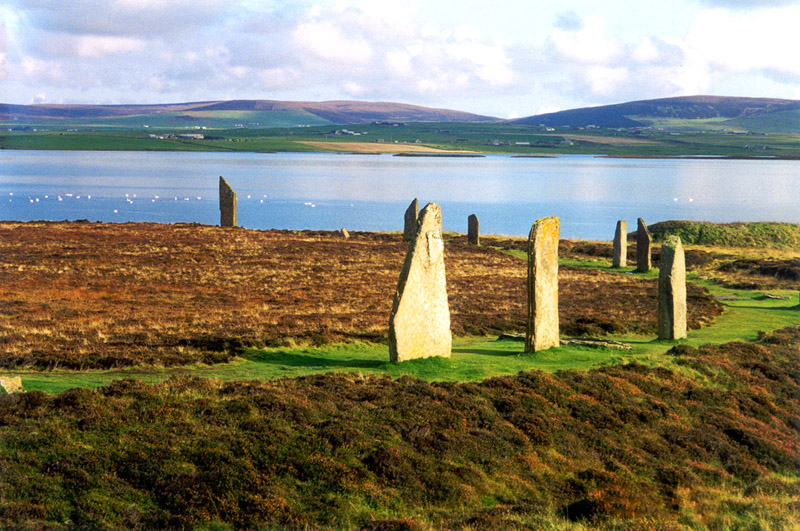
The Ring of Brodgar

==== Ness of Brodgar ====
Excavations by Orkney College at the nearby Ness of Brodgar site between the Ring and the Stones of Stenness revealed several buildings, both ritual and domestic and the works suggest there were likely to be more in the vicinity. One structure appears to be 20 metres (66 ft) long by 11 metres (36 ft) wide. Pottery, bones, stone tools and polished stone mace heads were discovered. Perhaps the most important find was the remains of a large stone wall which may have been 100 metres (330 ft) long and 4 metres (13 ft) or more wide. It appears to traverse the entire peninsula the site is on and may have been a symbolic barrier between the ritual landscape of the Ring and the mundane world around it.

In 2010 a rock coloured red, orange and yellow was unearthed. Although containers of pigments have been found at sites such as Skara Brae, this was the first discovery in Britain, and possibly in Northern Europe, of evidence that Neolithic peoples used paint to decorate their buildings. It is thought that the primitive paint could have been made from iron ore, mixed with animal fat, milk or eggs. Only a week later a stone with a zigzag chevron pattern painted with a red pigment was discovered nearby.

More recent excavations have revealed a large temple complex on the site without parallel in western Europe, with more than a dozen large temples that were linked to outhouses and kitchens by carefully constructed stone pavements. The site is now considered to be of such significance that Nick Card, director of excavations, was prompted to say in 2012: "We need to turn the map of Britain upside down when we consider the Neolithic and shrug off our south-centric attitudes...London may be the cultural hub of Britain today, but 5,000 years ago, Orkney was the centre for innovation for the British isles. Ideas spread from this place. The first grooved pottery, which is so distinctive of the era, was made here, for example, and the first henges – stone rings with ditches round them – were erected on Orkney. Then the ideas spread to the rest of the Neolithic Britain. This was the font for new thinking at the time."

In 2020, researchers found evidence of 5,000-year-old fabric by examining markings on pottery from Ness of Brodgar in Orkney. However, Neolithic woven textile was first discovered in Scotland at Flint Howe, near Stranraer, in 1966.

==== Stones of Stenness ====
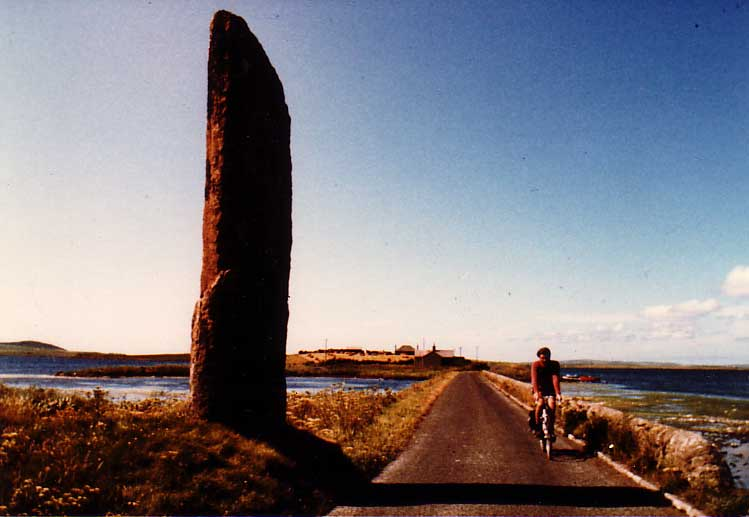
The Stenness Watch Stone stands outside the circle

The Stones of Stenness are five remaining megaliths of a henge, the largest of which is 6 metres (20 ft) high. The site is thought to date from 3100 BC, one of the earliest dates for a henge anywhere in Britain. The Stones are part of a landscape that evidently had considerable ritual significance for the "Grooved ware people". The Ring of Brodgar lies about 1.2 kilometres (0.75 mi) to the north-west, and Maeshowe is a similar distance to the east. Barnhouse is only 150 metres (490 ft) to the north.

The existing megaliths were originally part of an elliptical shaped stone circle of 12 stones, about 32 metres (105 ft) in diameter surrounded by a ditch that was 2 metres (6.6 ft) wide and 7 metres (23 ft) deep and with a single entrance causeway on the north side that faces towards the Barnhouse Settlement. The Watch Stone stands outside the circle to the north-west and is 5.6 metres (18 ft) high. Other smaller stones include a square stone like a huge hearth setting in the centre of the circle and this along with the bones of cattle, sheep, wolves and dogs found in the ditch suggest ritual sacrifice and feasting.

Even in the 18th century the site was still associated with traditions and rituals, by then relating to Norse gods. The "Odin Stone" was pierced with a circular hole, and was used by local couples for plighting engagements by holding hands through the gap. In the early 19th century a local landowner and recent immigrant to Orkney decided to remove the Stones on the grounds that local people were trespassing and disturbing his land in using the stones. He started in December 1814 by smashing the Odin Stone. This caused outrage and he was stopped after destroying one other stone and toppling another. The toppled stone was re-erected in 1906 along with some inaccurate reconstruction inside the circle.

=== Other Late Neolithic sites ===
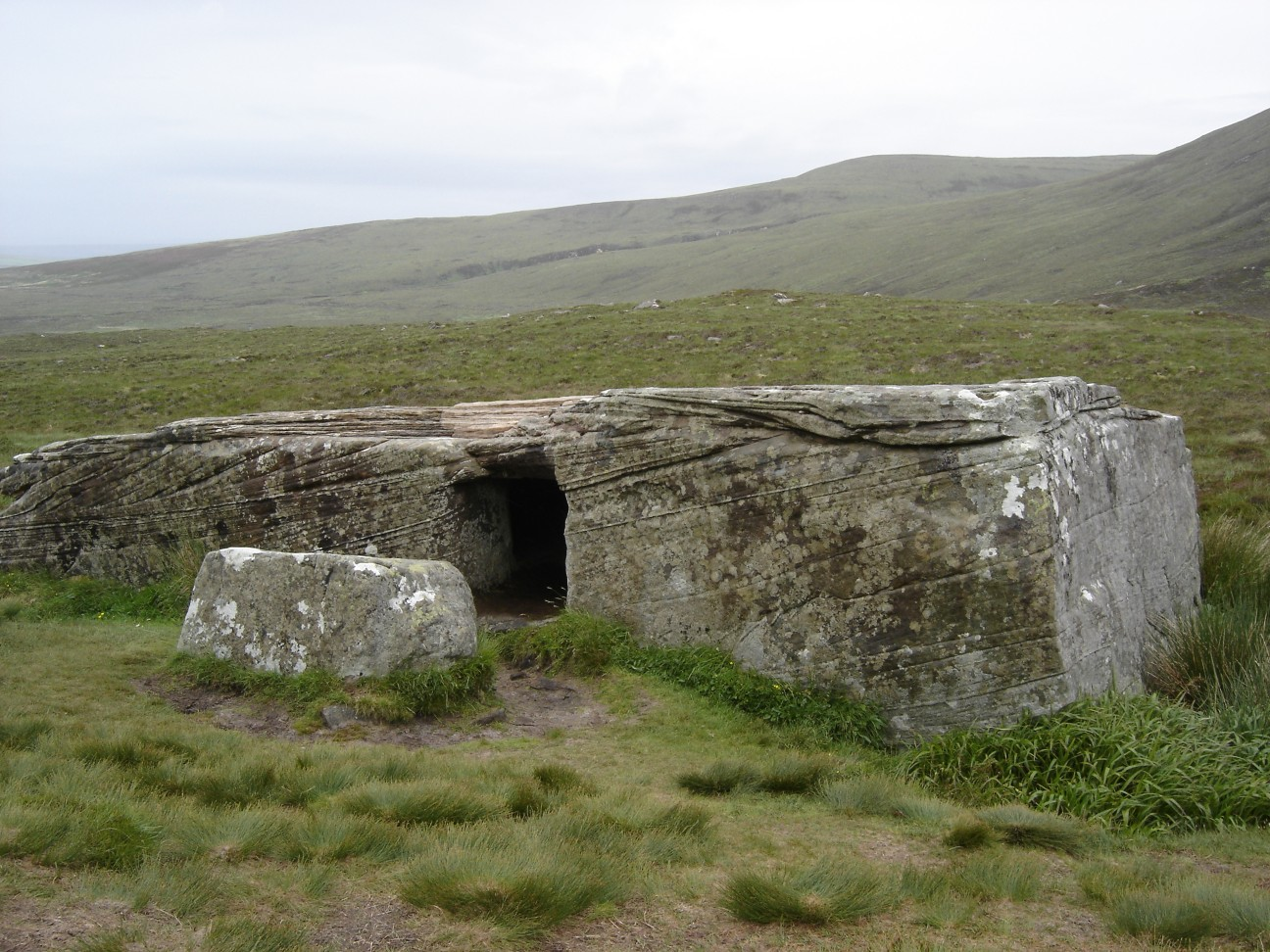
The Dwarfie Stane

The Isbister Chambered Cairn, popularly known as the "Tomb of the Eagles" is located on the cliffs of South Ronaldsay. This chambered tomb was in use for 800 years or more from 3150 BC, and has five separate stalls and three side-chambers. 16,000 human bones were found during the excavations, as well as 725 bird bones, predominantly white-tailed sea eagle and over 25 kilograms (55 lb) of pottery shards.

The Dwarfie Stane tomb on the island of Hoy is made from a single huge block of red sandstone with a hollowed-out central chamber. This style is quite unlike any other Neolithic Orkney site and probably dates from about 2500 BC. It was the first Orcadian ancient monument to be described in writing, appearing in the 16th century Descriptio Insularum Orchadiarum by Joannem Ben who provided the explanation for its existence as having been built and used by giants.

In September 2021, archaeologists announced the discovery of two polished stone balls in a 5500 years-old Neolithic burial tomb in Orkney in Sanday. According to Dr Hugo Anderson, second object was as the "size of a cricket ball, perfectly spherical and beautifully finished".

== Bronze Age ==
The Bronze Age in Scotland lasted from approximately 2200 BC to 800 BC and northern Scotland has produced a relative dearth of remains from this period in comparison to the Neolithic and later Iron Age. This may in part be due to deteriorating weather conditions in the second millennium BC. In Orkney, fewer large stone structures were built during this period, burials were now being made in small cists well away from the great megalithic sites and a new Beaker culture began to dominate. Ancient DNA evidence indicates that this cultural change was accompanied by large-scale immigration of Bell Beaker-related populations, resulting in a major replacement of the Neolithic Orcadian gene pool. Genome-wide analysis of 22 Bronze Age individuals from Westray found that they derived approximately 93–96% of their ancestry from populations related to Scottish Bell Beaker groups, with only about 4–7% associated with ancestry from Neolithic Orkney. Some indigenous Neolithic male lineages nevertheless persisted for at least another millennium.

Nonetheless, the great ceremonial circles continued in use as bronze metalworking was slowly introduced to Scotland from Europe over a lengthy period. There is agreement amongst historians that from about 1000 BC it is legitimate to talk of a Celtic culture in Scotland, although the nature of the Orcadian Celtic civilisation and their relationships to their neighbours remains largely unknown.

In addition to various Mainland sites such as Knowes of Trotty, Kirbuster Hill and the impressive Plumcake Mound near the Ring of Brodgar there are various Bronze Age structures on other islands such as Tofts Ness on Sanday, Warness on Eday, the remains of two houses on Holm of Faray, and a burnt mound and farmstead on Auskerry.

== Iron Age ==
=== Early Iron Age ===
The Iron Age provides numerous substantial building remains. In the 1970s excavations at Quanterness, near the site of the Neolithic chambered tomb, revealed an Atlantic roundhouse. This was built about 700 BC using stone stripped from the older building that had fallen into disuse some two millennia previously.

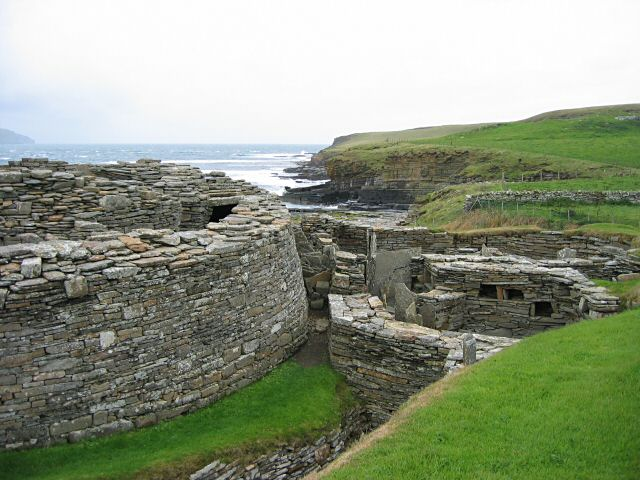
Midhowe Broch on the west coast of Rousay

Numerous similar finds have been made at for example, Bu on the Mainland and Pierowall Quarry on Westray. These are also many impressive broch sites. These are substantial stone towers that developed out of the roundhouse tradition in north and west Scotland, whose dry-stone walls may have reached 13 metres (43 ft) in height. Although Orkney has no broch towers where the surviving walls are more than a few metres high, several important sites have been excavated which have numerous associated buildings forming a "broch village".

Midhowe Broch lies close to the chambered cairn of the same name on Rousay. There appear to have been at least two separate periods of occupation and at some point buttresses were added to the exterior of the wall, suggesting the structure was in need of support. It is one of 11 broch sites on either side of the Eynhallow Sound. Burroughston Broch on the island of Shapinsay was built in the second half of the first millennium BC and excavated in the mid 19th century. Its earth cladding is intact, allowing visitors to peer down into the broch from above. The walls are up to 4 metres (13 ft) thick in places and there is a complete chamber off the entrance passage. The remains of stone furniture are evident in the interior.

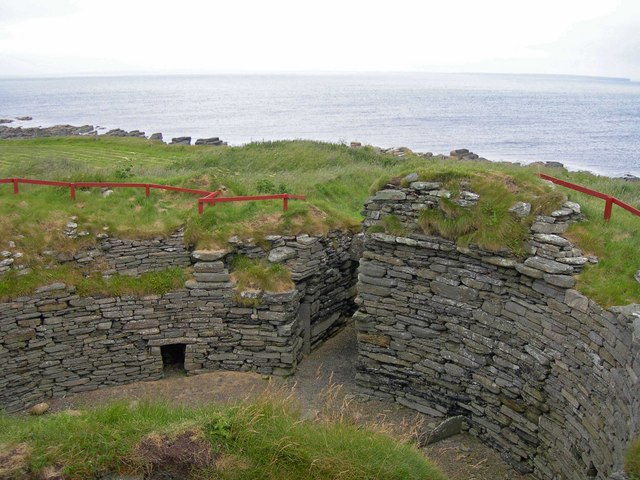
Burroughston Broch, Shapinsay

Mine Howe, located near Tankerness in the parish of St Andrews, is a prehistoric subterranean man-made chamber dug 7 metres (23 ft) deep inside a large mound. Its purpose is not obvious. The walls are lined with stones fitted to form an arch over the cavity and steep steps lead to a rock floor. The entrance is at the top of the small hill and there is a surrounding ditch and evidence of sophisticated metal working around the site. The Rennibister Earth House is a souterrain consisting of an oval chamber with a corbelled roof supported by pillars. Although these structures are usually associated with the storage of food this site is reminiscent of the Neolithic chambered tombs and excavations revealed 18 human skeletons.

Wheelhouses are stone buildings from the later Iron Age whose characteristic features include an outer wall within which a circle of stone piers (bearing a resemblance to the spokes of a wheel) form the basis for lintel arches supporting corbelled roofing with a hearth at the hub. Eight presumed sites have been identified in Orkney although the style is different from those of Shetland and the Western Isles. The Orkney sites are four on Sanday, one on Calf of Eday, one at Hillock of Burroughston on Shapinsay and two on the Mainland at Burrian Broch and Broch of Gurness.

=== The influence of Rome ===
For a brief period Orkney emerged from prehistory and into protohistory. The Greek explorer Pytheas visited Britain sometime between 322 and 285 BC and may have circumnavigated the mainland. In his On the Ocean he refers to the most northerly point as Orcas, conceivably a reference to Orkney.

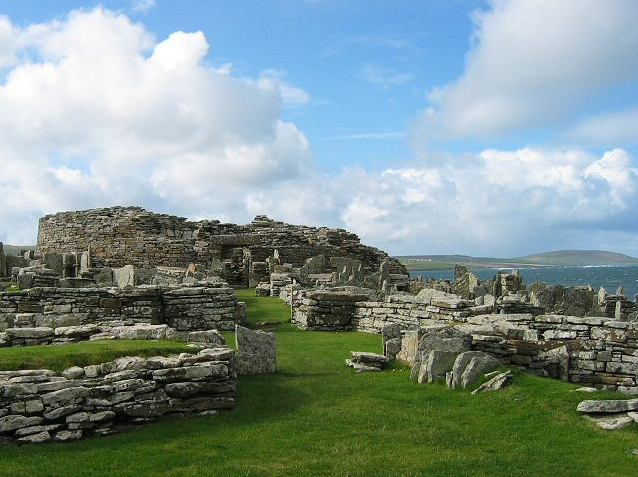
Broch of Gurness

Remarkably, the earliest written record of a formal connection between the Roman Empire and Scotland is the attendance of the "King of Orkney" who was one of eleven British kings who submitted to the Emperor Claudius at Colchester in AD 43 following the invasion of southern Britain three months earlier. The long distances and short period of time involved strongly suggest a prior connection between Rome and Orkney, although no evidence of this has been found and the contrast with later Caledonian resistance to Rome is striking. Pomponius Mela, the Roman geographer, recorded in his De Chorographia, written c. 43 AD, that there were thirty Orkney islands. There is certainly evidence of an Orcadian connection with Rome prior to AD 60 from pottery found at the Broch of Gurness and 1st and 2nd century Roman coins have been found at Lingro broch.

The Roman presence in Scotland was however little more than a series of relatively brief interludes of partial military occupation. As Roman influence waned in Scotland from 211 onwards, Orkney faded from history again and the Celtic Iron Age way of life continued, largely unchanged.

=== Pictish rule ===
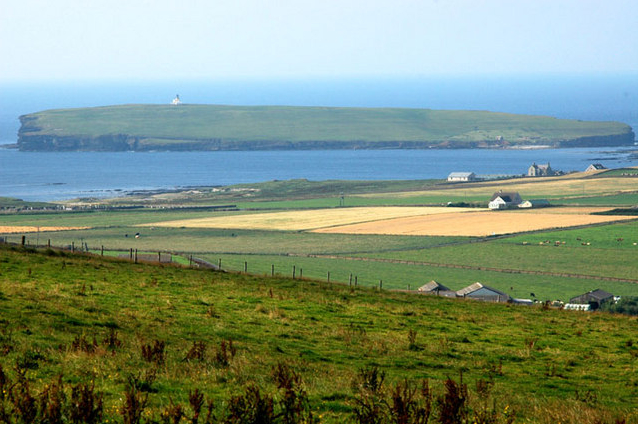
The tidal islet of Brough of Birsay

In the centuries following Rome's excursions into Scottish territory Orkney was, at least for a time, part of the Pictish kingdom. Very little is known about the Pictish Orcadians, the main archaeological relics being symbol stones. One of the best examples is located on the Brough of Birsay; it shows 3 warriors with spears and sword scabbards combined with traditional Pictish symbols. This small tidal island has a long history of settlement that continued into the Norse period.

Adomnan, the biographer of St Columba, states that there were Orcadians at the court of the Pictish High King, Bridei, in AD 565. These Orcadians were described as "hostages" which could imply difficult relations between Orkney and the king, although they may have simply been guests at the court. A Pictish cemetery was found in the grounds of Skaill House (adjacent to Skara Brae) in 1996.

Christianity probably arrived in Orkney in the 6th century and organised church authority emerged in the 8th century. The Buckquoy spindle-whorl found at a Pictish site on Birsay is an Ogham–inscribed artefact whose interpretation has caused controversy although it is now generally considered to be of both Irish and Christian origin. Evidence associated with the St Boniface Church on Papa Westray suggests this island had been the seat of the Christian bishopric of Orkney in Pictish times. The 8th century was also the time the Viking invasions of the Scottish seaboard commenced and with them came the arrival of a new culture and language for the Orkney islands. The Norse era has provided a variety of written records, the substantial Orkneyinga Saga amongst them and at this point the archipelago fully emerges into the historic era.

== Archaeological history ==
Formal excavations are first recorded at Earl's Knoll on Papa Stronsay in the Statistical Account of Scotland in 1795. As with the Dwarfie Stane, the mound was assumed to be a giant's grave at the time. Following soon after this, work on the "Picts-house" (i.e. chambered tomb) at Quanterness commenced, but little else of note was achieved until the mid 19th century. F. W. L. Thomas, whose day job was as a captain in the Royal Navy, published The Celtic Antiquities of Orkney in 1852, which listed various sites and aimed to interest "antiquarians" in the subject. His hopes were met and about a dozen chambered tombs were worked on between 1849 and 1867 by James Farrer, R.J. Hebden and George Petrie. However, other than work at Unstan near Stromness there was then a lull for about six decades. Then, from the late 1920s, work recommenced with the assistance of the Royal Commission on the Ancient and Historical Monuments of Scotland and the Ministry of Works. The most eminent archaeologist to work here at this time was Vere Gordon Childe. He was involved in excavations at Skara Brae and Rinyo, but it was only when a shard of pottery was discovered at the latter site that it became understood that these settlements dated to the Neolithic rather than the Iron Age. A further 18 tombs were excavated before 1950, including five on Eday and one on the Calf of Eday and by the 1960s the outlines of a modern understanding of Orcadian prehistory had emerged. The advent of radiocarbon dating enabled even more detailed dates to be established and refuted earlier theories that the chambered tombs of Orkney had developed from similar structures found in the Eastern Mediterranean, such as those built by the Minoans, when it became clear that the former pre-dated the latter by a considerable margin.

== See also ==
Other prehistoric sites in Orkney

- Mor Stein, a standing stone on the island of Shapinsay.
- Castle Bloody, a souterrain on Shapinsay

Structures

- Broch
- Atlantic roundhouse
- Wheelhouse
- Pictish symbol stones

Prehistoric Scotland

- Timeline of prehistoric Scotland
- Prehistoric Scotland
- Oldest buildings in Scotland
- World Heritage Sites in Scotland
- Jarlshof, Shetland
- Callanish Stones, Lewis
- Kilmartin Glen, mainland Scotland

Prehistoric British Isles

- Prehistoric Britain
- Stonehenge, England
- Newgrange, Ireland

Prehistoric Europe

- Carnac Stones, Brittany
- Nuraghe, Sardinian Bronze Age towers

International

- List of archaeoastronomical sites sorted by country
