= Jarlshof =

Archeological site in Shetland, Scotland

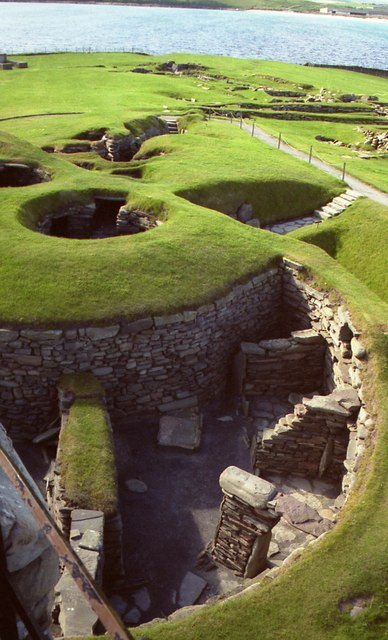
- Jarlshof, February 2007

- Location within Shetland
- Interactive map of Jarlshof
- 59°52′10″N 1°17′28″W
- Type: Roundhouses, broch, wheelhouses, longhouse
- Periods: Bronze Age Iron Age, Pictish, Norse
- Location: Mainland, Shetland, Scotland

Site notes
- Owner: Historic Scotland

Jarlshof (Shaetlan pronunciation: [ˈjarɫzhɒf] YARLZ-hof) is the best-known prehistoric archaeological site in Shetland, Scotland. It lies in Sumburgh, Mainland, Shetland and has been described as "one of the most remarkable archaeological sites ever excavated in the British Isles". It contains remains dating from 2500 BC up to the 17th century AD.

The Bronze Age settlers left evidence of several small oval houses with thick stone walls and various artefacts including a decorated bone object. The Iron Age ruins include several different types of structures, including a broch and a defensive wall around the site. The Pictish period provides various works of art including a painted pebble and a symbol stone. The Viking Age ruins make up the largest such site visible anywhere in Britain and include a longhouse; excavations provided numerous tools and a detailed insight into life in Shetland at this time. The most visible structures on the site are the walls of the Scottish period fortified manor house, which inspired the name "Jarlshof" that first appears in an 1821 novel by Walter Scott.

The site is in the care of Historic Scotland and is open year-round, with longer opening hours during April to September. In 2012, Jarlshof, Mousa and Old Scatness were added to the UK's tentative list of proposed World Heritage Sites in a combination called the "Zenith of Iron Age Shetland."

== Location and etymology ==
Jarlshof lies near the southern tip of the Shetland Mainland, close to the settlements of Sumburgh and Grutness and to the south end of Sumburgh Airport. The site overlooks an arm of the sea called the West Voe of Sumburgh and the nearby freshwater springs and building materials available on the beach will have added to the location's attraction as a settlement. The south Mainland also provides a favourable location for arable cultivation in a Shetland context and there is a high density of prehistoric settlement in the surrounding area. Jarlshof is only one mile (1.5 kilometres) from Scatness where the remains of another broch and other ruins of a similar longevity were discovered in 1975. There is a small visitor centre at Jarlshof with displays and a collection of artefacts.

The name Jarlshof meaning "Earl's Mansion" is a coinage of Walter Scott, who visited the site in 1814. The author based it on the Scottish period term for "the laird's house." It was more than a century later before excavations proved that there had actually been Viking Age settlement on the site, although there is no evidence that a Norse jarl ever lived there.

== History ==
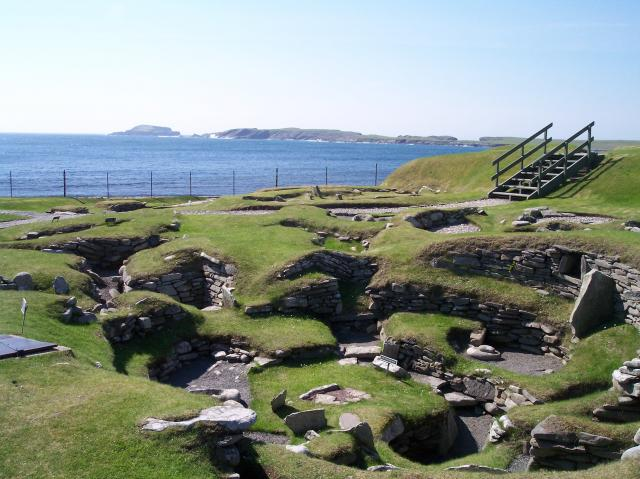
Jarlshof with West Voe of Sumburgh beyond

The remains at Jarlshof represent thousands of years of human occupation and can be seen as a microcosm of Shetland history. Other than the Old House of Sumburgh (see below), the site remained largely hidden until a storm in the late 19th century washed away part of the shore, and revealed evidence of these ancient buildings. Formal archaeological excavation started in 1925, and Bronze Age relics were soon discovered. Jarlshof was one of first two broch sites to be excavated using modern scientific techniques between 1949 and 1952. Although the deposits within the broch had been badly disturbed by earlier attempts, this work revealed a complex sequence of construction from different periods. Buildings on the site include the remains of a Bronze Age smithy, an Iron Age broch, an roundhouses, a complex of Pictish wheelhouses, a Viking longhouse and a mediaeval farmhouse. No further excavations have been undertaken since the early 1950s, and no radiocarbon dating has been attempted.

=== Neolithic ===
The earliest finds are pottery from the Neolithic era, although the main settlement dates from the Bronze Age (see below). A site nearby has been dated to 3200 BC.

=== Bronze Age ===
The Bronze Age in Scotland lasted from approximately 2000 BC to 800 BC. The oldest known remains on the Jarlshof site date from this period, although there is evidence of inhabitation as far back as 2500 BC. The remains of several small oval houses with thick stone walls date to the late Bronze Age and the structures show some similarity to Skara Brae on Mainland, Orkney but are smaller and of a later date. These buildings may have been partly subterranean at the earliest period of inhabitation, a technique providing both structural stability and insulation.

There is also evidence of a cattle stall with a waste channel leading to a tank in a courtyard and a whale vertebra set into a wall that may have been used as a tethering post. Broken moulds from the smithy indicate that axes, knives, swords and pins were produced there, and a bronze dagger was found at the site. The objects indicate the smith was trained in the Irish style of working. Bone pins and awls also survived, and an extraordinary bone "plaque" was discovered. This latter object is 5 centimetres (2 inches) long, has three holes bored into the ends and is decorated with various linear patterns. Its function is unknown. The Bronze Age structures are overlain with sterile sand, suggesting a break in occupation prior to the next phase of building.

=== Iron Age and Pictish period ===
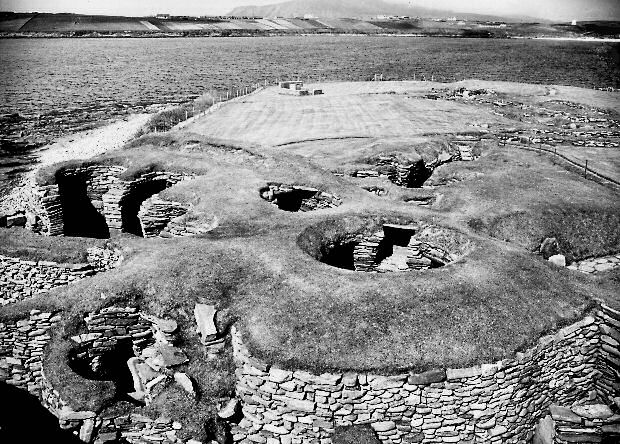
The exterior of the wheelhouses at Jarlshof

The inhabitants of the Iron Age built part of their settlement on top of the Bronze Age one. The structures include a complex roundhouse, replaced at a later stage by an "aisled roundhouse." Neither have been dated, although artefacts found at the site include querns that suggest the later roundhouse may have been constructed prior to 200 BC.

It is in this period that the broch was built. Part of the structure has been lost to coastal erosion, and modern sea defences have been erected. The tower was probably originally 13 metres (40 feet) or more high. Like many other broch sites, the position would have commanded fine views of the surrounding seas. Other archaeological sites of the period discovered in Shetland usually exhibit defensive fortifications of some kind, and Jarlshof is no exception. An outer defensive wall associated with the broch contained a substantial (although rather poorly constructed) house and byre at one time. This wall was utilised at a later stage to build a large roundhouse in the lee of the broch.

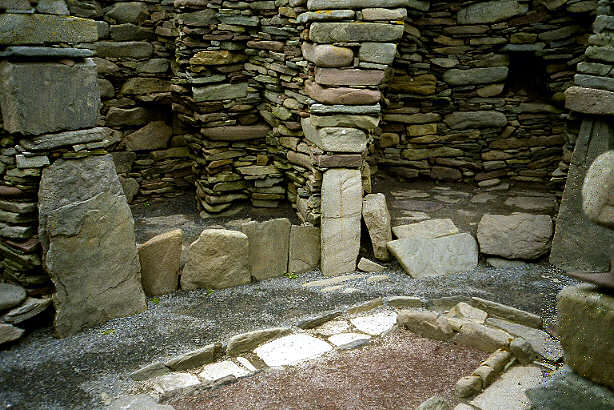
The interior of a Jarlshof wheelhouse showing bays between the stone piers.

The earliest part of the wheelhouse complex has been dated to 200 BC, although other parts were built later, post-dating the 1st century BC–2nd century AD profusion of these structures in the Western Isles by several centuries. Construction used the stones of the broch itself. Two of the four main structures are amongst the best examples of their type. Three successive periods of construction were undertaken. The best preserved structure retains a significant proportion of the stone part of its roof and displays a series of corbelled bays. Another one was built as a circular building and the radial piers were inserted afterwards. This may have been a less stable earlier design. In one case the piers are alternately rectangular and V-shaped, in another all are to the latter design, again suggesting a developing style. Unlike many wheelhouses elsewhere in Scotland that are built into the earth, the Jarlshof structures seem to have been built from ground level upwards.

Amongst the artefacts dated to the later Pictish period is a bone pin with a rounded head probably used as a hair or dress pin. It has been dated to AD 500–800. "Painted pebbles" are associated with more than two dozen Pictish sites, and one such stone was unearthed at Jarlshof. This rectangular slate fragment had a cross painted onto it and two small S-shaped scrolls suggesting an association with Christian beliefs. One of only two Pictish symbol stones found in Shetland was found here, exhibiting a double disc shape and a Z-rod. Pottery finds include buff ware from the period after AD 10, including bowls with flat rims. The quality of the pots appears to decline in the period prior to Viking settlement, becoming thinner-walled and generally more crude in design.

In AD 43 and 77 the Roman authors Pomponius Mela and Pliny the Elder referred to the seven islands they call Haemodae and Acmodae respectively, both of which are assumed to be Shetland. Another early written reference to the Shetland islands may have been when Tacitus reported that the Roman fleet had seen "Thule" on a voyage that included the Orkney archipelago in AD 98. Watson in 1926 stated that Tacitus was referring to southern Shetland, probably the area of the brochs in Jarlshof.

=== Norse period ===
Remains from this era used to cover most of the site, and it is believed the Norse inhabited the site continuously from the ninth to the 14th centuries. Excavations in the 1930s by Alex Curle found the first confirmed Norse longhouse in the British Isles and later digs in the 1950s found evidence of fishing and farming activities. Sheep, cattle, pigs and ponies were kept, Atlantic cod, saithe and ling were eaten, and whale and seal bones have also been found along with the remains of a single dog. Chicken bones are rare in the Norse levels.

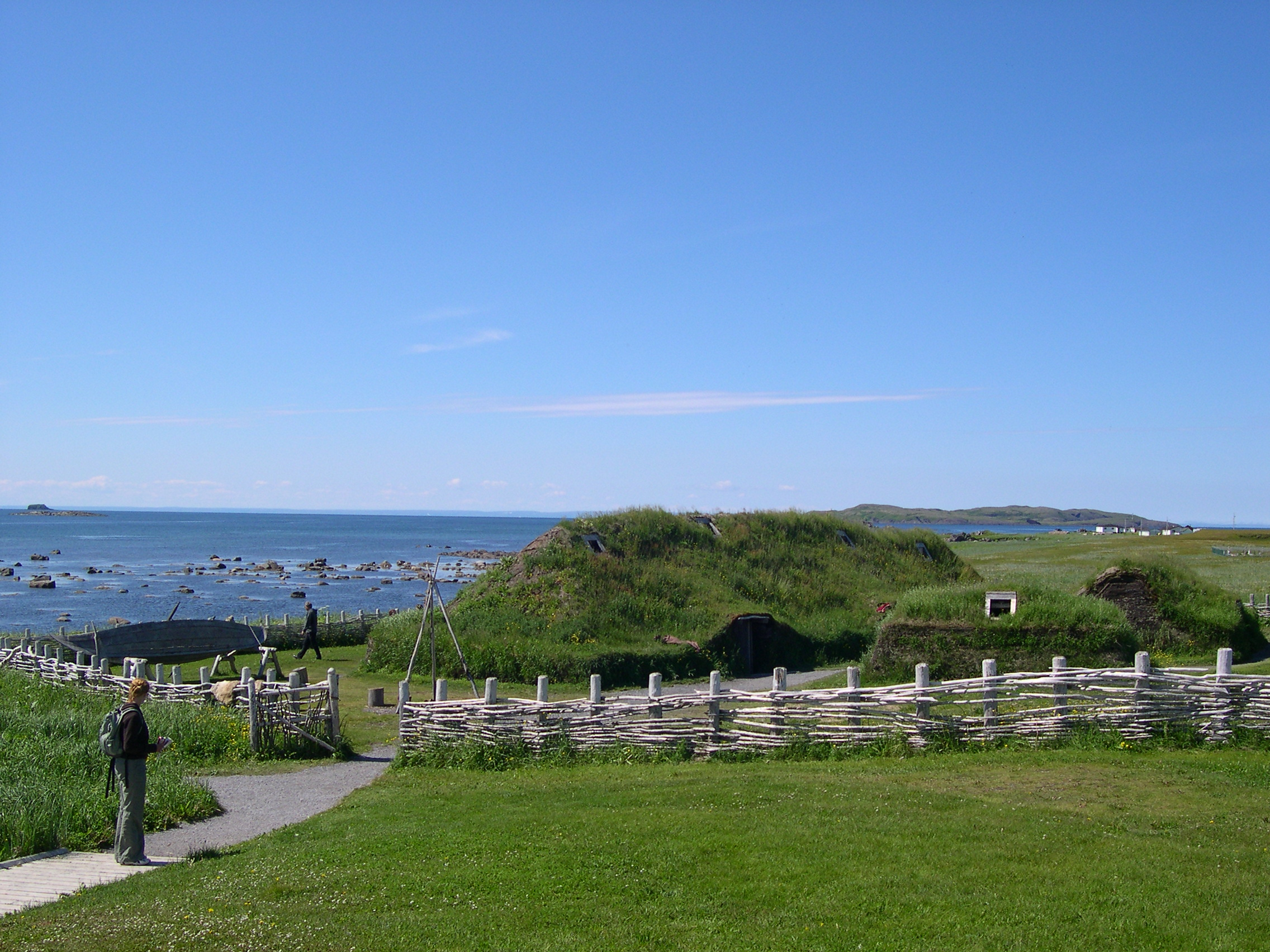
Re-creation of a Viking settlement in L'Anse-aux-Meadows, Newfoundland, Canada similar in scale to Jarlshof.

There are seven Norse-era houses at Jarlshof, although no more than two were in use at one time. There were several outbuildings, including a small square structure with a large hearth that may have been a sauna and which was later replaced by two separate outhouses. The largest house from this period is a 20-by-5-metre (66-by-16-foot) rectangular chamber with opposing doors, timber benches along the long sides, and a hearth in the centre. Unlike the earlier structures that had conical thatched roofs, those of the Norse buildings had ridged timber frames. At a later period this large structure was also used to shelter domesticated animals (at which stage it had a paved centre and animal stalls along the sides) and later still may have become an outbuilding. The door to the byre puzzled archaeologists as it appeared to be too narrow to admit a cow. The mystery was solved when a byre door was excavated at Easting on Unst which had a narrow base similar to Jarlshof's but which widened out to become cow-shaped. Another outbuilding has been interpreted as a corn-drying room. Later houses were built at 90 degrees to the longhouse and these are of a type and size that is similar to croft houses that were common in Shetland until the mid-19th century.

One hundred and fifty loom weights were found suggesting wool was an important aspect of Norse-era life. Line weights from the later Norse period and associated evidence from elsewhere in Shetland indicates that deep-water fishing was also a regular undertaking. The Jarlshof site also produced ample evidence of the use of iron tools such as shears, scissors, sickles, and a fish-hook and knife. The ore was locally obtained bog iron. Hazel, birch and willow grew in the area at this time but the pine and oak must have been driftwood or imported timber.

Drawings scratched on slate have been found of dragon-prowed ships, portraits of an old man and of a young, bearded man and of a four-legged animal. The drawings were found in the Viking levels but are Pictish in style and may either pre-date the arrival of the Norse or indicate a continuity of art and culture from one period to the next. Similarly, although the rectangular shape of the Norse-era buildings are quite unlike the earlier rounded Pictish style, the basement courses of the two periods are constructed in the same way. The Viking-style loom weights, spindle whorls and other vessels were found with stone discs and other objects of a Pictish design. A bronze–gilt harness mounting made in Ireland in the 8th or 9th centuries has also been found and many items from this period are in the Shetland Museum. Jarlshof contains the most extensive remains of a Viking site visible anywhere in Britain.

=== Old House of Sumburgh ===
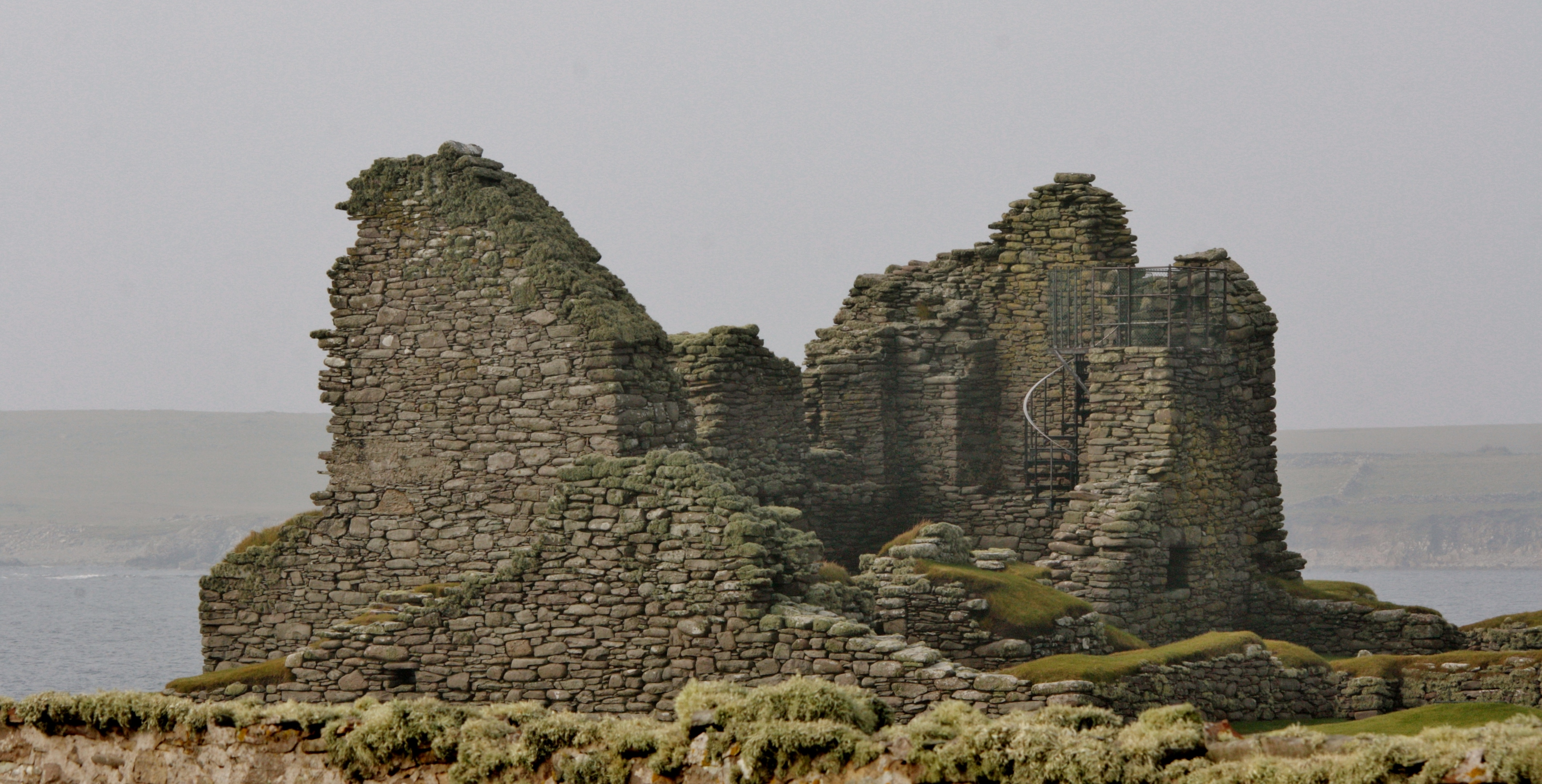
The Old House of Sumburgh dating from the early 17th century

The castle, now known as Jarlshof House, was built during the Scottish period. Originally a medieval stone farmhouse, it was converted into a fortified house during the 16th century, by Robert Stewart, 1st Earl of Orkney after Scotland annexed Shetland. The building was named "New Hall" at this time. It was further modernised in the early 17th century by his son Patrick Stewart, 2nd Earl of Orkney who renamed it the "Old House of Sumburgh". It then passed into the keeping of John Buchanan and Margaret Hartsyde, but was abandoned in the late 17th century. The structure was also known as "The laird's house" and "Stewart Mansion".

== Cultural references ==
Walter Scott set part of his 1821 novel The Pirate in the Old House of Sumburgh during the 17th century, which he named Jarlshof.

Man, however, had in former days considered this as a remote or unlikely event; for a Norwegian chief of other times, or, as other accounts said, and as the name of Jarlshof seemed to imply an ancient Earl of the Orkneys had elected this neck of land as the place for establishing a mansion-house. It has been long entirely deserted, and the vestiges only can be discerned with difficulty; for the loose sand, borne on the temptestuous gales of those stormy regions, has overblown, and almost buried, the ruins of the buildings; but in the end of the seventeenth century, a part of the Earl's mansion was still entire and habitable. It was a rude building of rough stone, with nothing about it to gratify the eye, or to excite the imagination; a large old-fashioned narrow house, with a very steep roof, covered with flags composed of grey sandstone, would perhaps convey the best of idea of the place to a modern reader. The windows were few, very small in size, and distributed up and down the building with utter contempt of regularity. Against the main structure had rested, in former times, certain smaller compartments of the mansion-house, containing offices, or subordinate apartments, necessary for the Earl's retainers and menials. But these had become ruinous; and the rafters had been taken down for fire-wood, or for other purposes; the walls had given way in many places; and, to complete the devastation, the sand had already drifted amongst the ruins, and filled up what had been once the chambers the contained, to the depth of two or three feet.

Amid this desolation, the inhabitants of Jarlshof had contrived, by constant labour and attention, to keep in order a few roods of land, which had been enclosed as a garden, and which, sheltered by the walls of the house itself, from the relentless sea-blast, produced such vegetables as the climate could bring forth, or rather as the sea-gale would permit to grow; for these islands experience even less of the rigour of cold than is encountered on the mainland of Scotland; but, unsheltered by a wall of some sort of other, it is scarce possible to raise even the most ordinary culinary vegetables; and as for shrubs or trees, they are entirely out of the question, such is the force of the sweeping sea-blast.

== Conservation and heritage status ==
Jarlshof is protected as a scheduled monument and is managed by Historic Environment Scotland, the public body responsible for safeguarding Scotland's historic environment. The site is open to visitors and is widely regarded as one of the most important archaeological locations in Shetland.

The settlement stands on a low coastal headland overlooking the West Voe of Sumburgh. This exposed position has shaped both the discovery and preservation of the site. Storm damage along the shoreline in the late nineteenth century first revealed parts of the buried remains, leading to archaeological excavations in the early twentieth century.

The same coastal environment that exposed the site continues to threaten it. Wind, waves and storms gradually erode the shoreline and can expose or damage buried remains. Conservation work therefore focuses on stabilising visible structures, monitoring erosion, and managing visitor access.

Jarlshof preserves an unusually complete sequence of settlements spanning several thousand years. Protecting the site ensures that this record of human occupation in the Northern Isles remains visible and accessible for future study.

== See also ==
Shetland

- Broch of Clickimin
- Broch of Mousa
- Old Scatness
- Scalloway Castle

Other

- Prehistoric Scotland
- Timeline of prehistoric Scotland
- Prehistoric Orkney
- Brough of Birsay – a site of similar antiquity in Orkney
- Oldest buildings in the United Kingdom
