= Scottish Ten =

Digital models of 10 heritage sites

The Scottish Ten was a five-year project, initiated in 2009, funded by the Scottish Government. It used technology to create accurate digital models of the country's five World Heritage Sites and five other UNESCO World Heritage Sites elsewhere in the world.

== History ==
The Scottish Ten project was initiated by the Minister for Culture, External Affairs and the Constitution Michael Russel in early 2009, at the Glasgow School of Art’s Digital Documentation conference. Russell had heard Ben Kacyra, inventor of a laser scanner and founder of CyArk, speak about his mission to digitally document the 500 most at risk heritage sites across the world over the next five years. Russell was inspired by this project and discussion began as to how Scotland could be involved. The Scottish Ten project was formally announced at the Mount Rushmore National Memorial on 4 July 2009.

== About the Scottish Ten ==
The Scottish Ten project's primary aims were to:

- Record important historical sites for the benefit of future generations in Scotland and overseas
- Share and disseminate Scottish technical expertise and foster international collaboration
- Provide digital media to site managers to better care for the heritage resource
- Recognise international Scottish cultural connections

Led by Historic Scotland and its partner Glasgow School of Art, under their collaborative venture The Centre for Digital Documentation and Visualisation LLP, the Scottish Ten project created digital documentation of the sites for future development of world class and innovative research, education and management.

The project scanned the five UNES World Heritage Sites in Scotland. The overseas sites were selected to fulfil Scottish Government International objectives in Australia, China, India, Japan and the United States.

The 18th century cotton-manufacturing settlement at New Lanark was the first Scottish site to be scanned. Mount Rushmore in South Dakota, in the United States, was scanned in August 2009.

The project used highly precise, high speed terrestrial laser scanning systems, some capable of sub-millimetre data capture and aerial optical remote sensing technology called LIDAR (Light Detection And Ranging).

When the digital models were complete, they were hosted by CyArk, a non-profit organisation set up to digitally record heritage sites across the globe and provide public access to the information.

== Sites ==
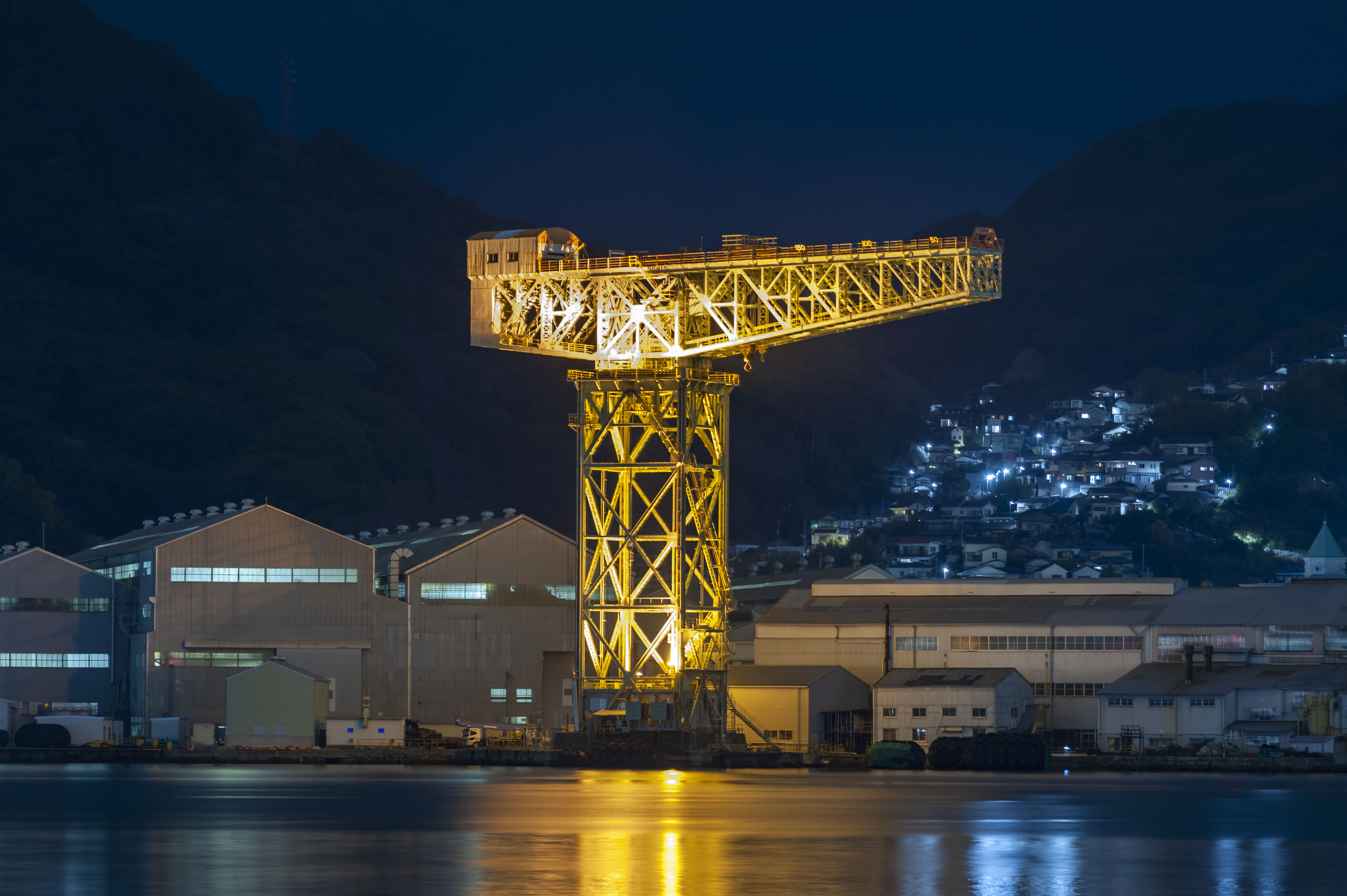
Mitsubishi Nagasaki Giant Cantilever Crane at Night

The five Scottish UNESCO World Heritage Sites are:

- Antonine Wall
- Edinburgh
- Neolithic Orkney
- New Lanark
- St. Kilda

The five non-Scottish UNESCO World Heritage Sites are:

- Eastern Qing Tombs (China)
- Giant Cantilever Crane at Nagasaki (Japan)
- Mount Rushmore (USA)
- Rani ki vav (India)
- Sydney Opera House (Australia)
