= Atlantic roundhouse =

Iron Age stone building

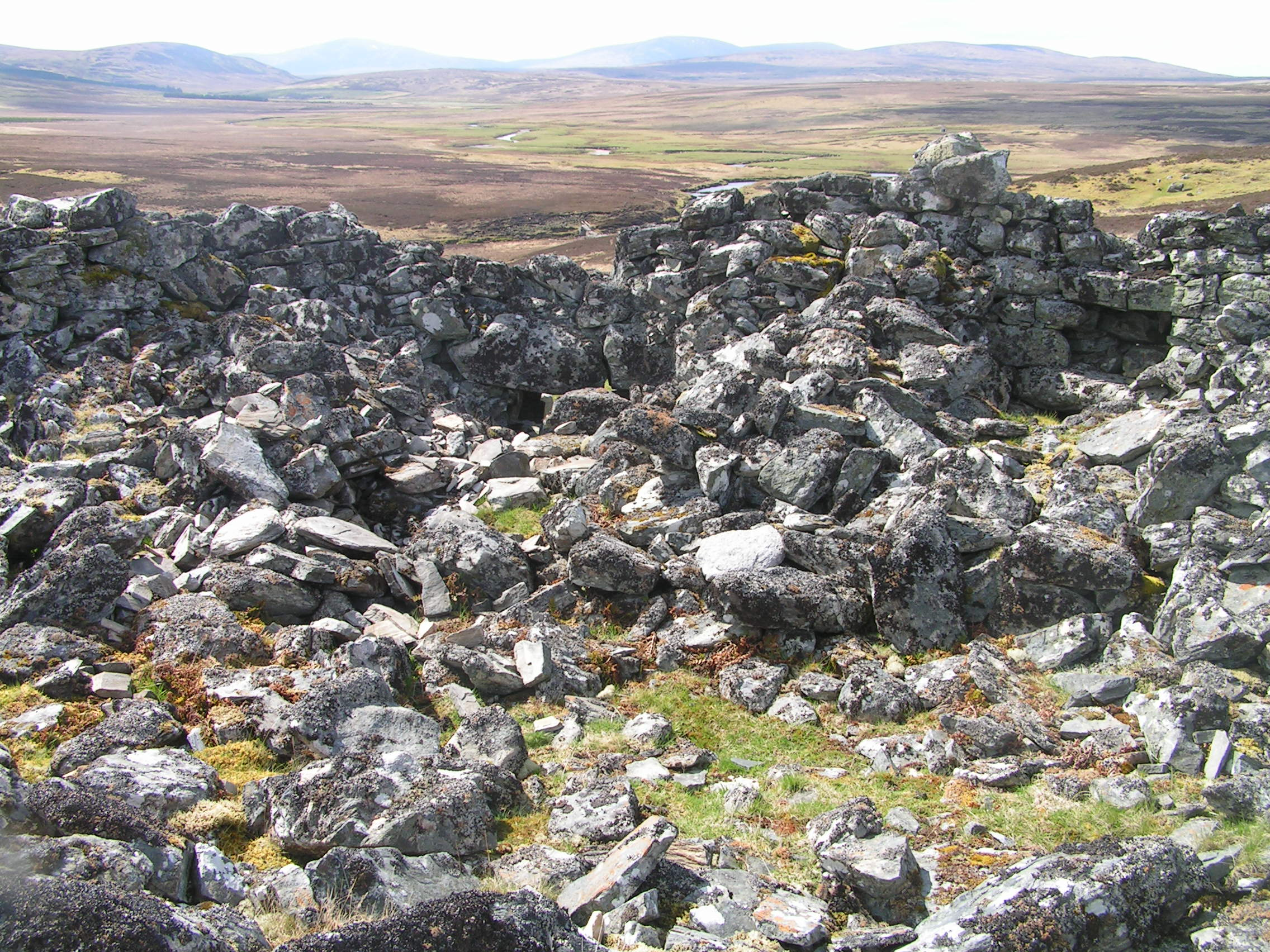
View from inside the remains of the complex Atlantic roundhouse at Feranach, Sutherland

In archaeology, an Atlantic roundhouse is an Iron Age stone building found in the northern and western parts of mainland Scotland, the Northern Isles and the Hebrides.

Circular houses were the predominant architectural style of the British landscape since the second millennium BC (Early Bronze Age). Although not many of these roundhouses have survived, it has been ascertained that they were based on wattle and daub walls with thatched conical roofs.

In 1970, archaeologist Chris Musson estimated that there were 200 certified roundhouses in Scotland and Britain. A United Kingdom-based archaeology group today estimates that there are over 4000 roundhouses. The oldest documented roundhouse was founded in the 3rd millennium BC in South-West Scotland. The Bronze Age people were known to adapt to the leveled upland landscapes situated in hillsides.

== Types of structure ==
A form of dry-stone Iron Age dwelling, they are unique to the region and are subdivided by the archaeologists into two broad types - simple and complex. According to this theory, they marked a movement away from the earlier, externally unprepossessing types of dwelling, such as those at Skara Brae, towards structures which were more dominating features in the landscape.

An example of a simple Atlantic roundhouse is at Bu in Orkney, while complex structures include the brochs, duns and wheelhouses.

Although constructed out of stone, they are thought to have had a conical wooden roof similar to that of the timber roundhouses found elsewhere.

Examples can be found at Dun Ringill on Skye, Dun Carloway on Lewis, Pierowall on Westray and Jarlshof in Shetland.

== Modern reconstruction ==
Dunvegan Community Trust plans to re-create an Iron Age roundhouse structure at Orbost on Skye with the help of National Lottery funding.

The Society of Antiquaries of Scotland undertook a project to reexamine the Atlantic roundhouses of the Tarbat Peninsula, Easter Ross by taking kite photographs of the sites, surveys, and excavation led by archaeologists. The reconstructions show spherical enclosures famous for the roundhouses with early Iron Age turf and timber roundhouse.

== See also ==
=== Scotland ===
- Broch
- Crannog
- Wheelhouse (archaeology)

=== Elsewhere ===
- Nuraghe
- Talaiot
- Palloza
- Rondavel
- Irish round tower
