= Wheelhouse (archaeology) =

Prehistoric structure

Video of the Grimsay wheelhouse, near Bagh nam Feadag, the best preserved example in the Uists

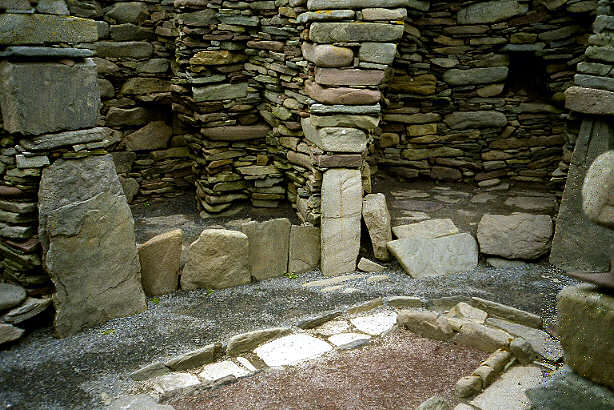
The interior of a Jarlshof wheelhouse showing bays between the stone piers

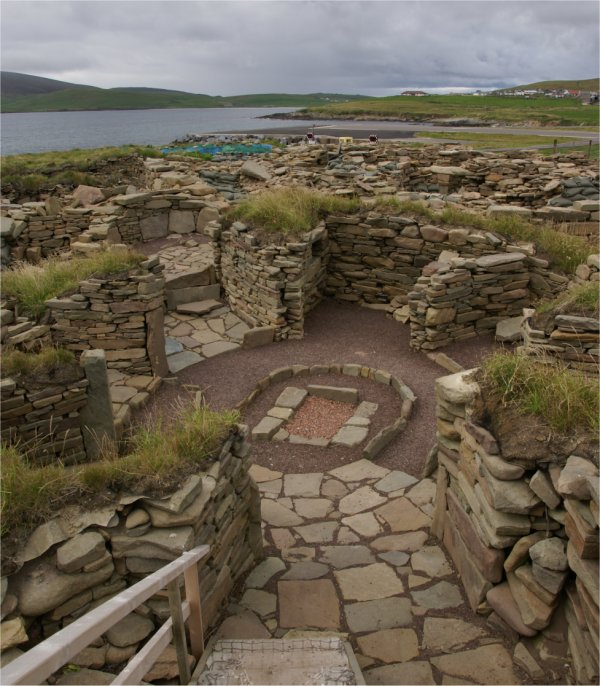
Wheelhouse at the archæological site of Old Scatness, Shetland

In archaeology, a wheelhouse is a prehistoric structure from the Iron Age found in Scotland. The term was coined after the discovery of a ruined mound in 1855. The distinctive architectural form related to the complex roundhouses constitute the main settlement type in the Western Isles in the closing centuries BC. A total of 62 sites have now been identified in the Northern and Western Isles, and on the north coast of Caithness and Sutherland.

Amateur enthusiasts did some excavation in the 19th century, but professional examination of the sites did not begin until the 1930s, when digs were undertaken at Jarlshof and Gurness. No work of a modern standard was done in the Hebrides until 1946 at Clettreval on North Uist.

Sometimes referred to as "aisled roundhouses" their characteristic features include an outer wall within which a circle of stone piers (bearing a resemblance to the spokes of a wheel) form the basis for lintel arches supporting corbelled roofing with a hearth at the hub. About a third are double-walled. They range in diameter from 4 to 11.5 metres (13 to 38 feet). Those sites that have been dated tend to fall within the period 25 BC to 380 AD. In the Northern Isles, 72% are found in association with broch sites, and they are of a later date than these towered structures in all cases. No sites in the west have such an association, an as yet unresolved enigma. The majority are dug into the landscape and only their thatched roofs would have been visible above the ground — although these would have been 6 metres or more in height. Other examples were built above ground, such as Clettraval and Bagh nam Feadag (on Grimsay).

Many sites incorporate animal burials beneath the floor, the most common bones being those of young lambs. Other bone deposits include the heads of a human and a great auk at Cnip on Lewis, and sixty bone burials including cattle, sheep and pig at Sollas in North Uist. Five sites include menhirs and fifteen a red and black mortar. These features tends to support the hypothesis that the primary purpose of these buildings was ritualistic. Confusingly therefore, "wheelhouses" are neither wheels, nor perhaps houses.

The highly restricted nature of their geographical locations suggests that they may have been contained within a political or cultural frontier of some kind. The co-incidence of their arrival and departure being associated with the period of Roman influence in Scotland is a matter of ongoing debate.

== See also ==
- Atlantic roundhouse
- Broch
- Timeline of prehistoric Scotland
