= List of oldest buildings in Scotland =

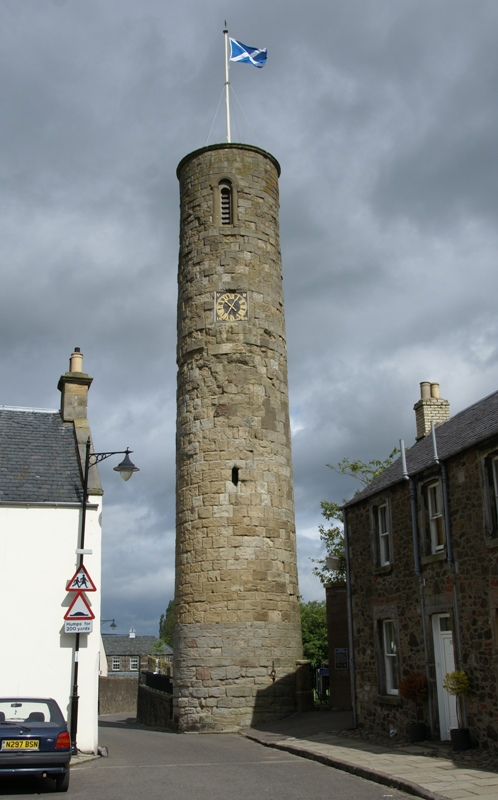
Abernethy Round Tower, which dates from 1100 AD.

This article lists the oldest extant freestanding buildings in Scotland. In order to qualify for the list a structure must:

- be a recognisable building (defined as any human-made structure used or intended for supporting or sheltering any use or continuous occupancy);
- incorporate features of building work from the claimed date to at least 1.5 metres (4.9 ft) in height and/or be a listed building.

This consciously excludes ruins of limited height, roads and statues. Bridges may be included if they otherwise fulfill the above criteria. Dates for many of the oldest structures have been arrived at by radiocarbon dating and should be considered approximate.

The main chronological list includes buildings that date from no later than 1199 AD. Although the oldest building on the list is the Neolithic farmhouse at Knap of Howar, the earliest period is dominated by chambered cairns, numerous examples of which can be found from the 4th millennium BC through to the early Bronze Age.

Estimates of the number of broch sites throughout the country, which date from the Iron Age, range from just over 100 to over 500. However, only a small percentage are sufficiently well preserved for them to be included here and some of those that could be remain undated.

As there are relatively few structures from the latter half of the first millennium AD and a significant number from the 12th century, the latter group is placed in a sub-list. There are larger numbers of extant qualifying structures from 1200 onwards and separate lists for 13th-century castles and religious buildings are provided. As the oldest buildings in many of the council areas in the more urbanised Central Belt date from after the 14th century, a separate list showing oldest buildings by council area is provided.

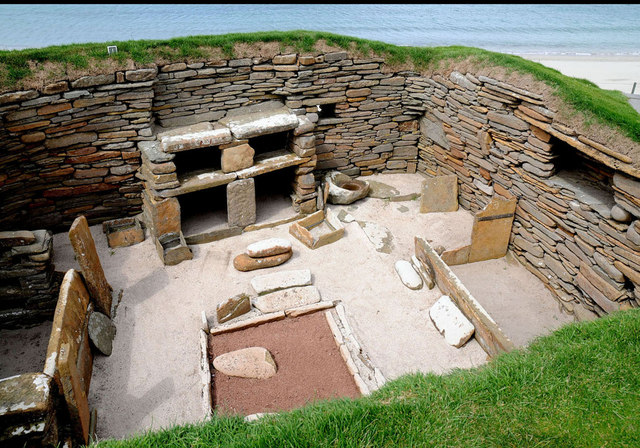
Dwelling at Skara Brae, part of the Heart of Neolithic Orkney World Heritage Site

There is also a supplementary list of qualifying structures for which no confirmed date of construction is available and a short listing of substantial prehistoric structures that are not buildings as defined above.

== Main list ==
=== Neolithic and Bronze Age ===
Building	Image	Location	Council area	First built	Use	Notes
Knap of Howar		Papa Westray	Orkney	3800 BC	House	Oldest preserved stone house in north west Europe.
Midhowe Chambered Cairn		Rousay	Orkney	3500 BC	Tomb	A well-preserved example of the Orkney-Cromarty type on the island of Rousay.
Unstan Chambered Cairn		Stenness	Orkney	3450 BC	Tomb	Excavated in 1884, when grave goods were found, giving their name to Unstan ware.
Knowe of Yarso chambered cairn		Rousay	Orkney	3350 BC	Tomb	One of several Rousay tombs. It contained numerous deer skeletons when excavated in the 1930s.
Quanterness chambered cairn		St Ola	Orkney	3250 BC	Tomb	The remains of 157 individuals were found inside when excavated in the 1970s.
Skara Brae		Sandwick	Orkney	3180 BC	Settlement	Northern Europe's best preserved Neolithic village.
Tomb of the Eagles		South Ronaldsay	Orkney	3150 BC	Tomb	In use for 800 years or more. Numerous bird bones were found here, predominantly white-tailed sea eagle.
Grey Cairns of Camster		Upper Camster	Highland	3000 BC or older	Tomb	A group of three cairns.
Blackhammer Chambered Cairn		Rousay	Orkney	3000 BC	Tomb	An Orkney–Cromarty chambered cairn, characterized by stalled burial compartments.
Taversoe Tuick chambered cairn		Rousay	Orkney	3000 BC	Tomb	Unusually, there is an upper and lower chamber.
Holm of Papa chambered cairn		Holm of Papa	Orkney	3000 BC	Tomb	The central chamber is over 20 metres long.
Barpa Langass		North Uist	Na h-Eileanan Siar	3000 BC	Tomb	The best preserved chambered cairn in the Hebrides.
Cuween Hill Chambered Cairn		Finstown	Orkney	3000 BC	Tomb	Excavated in 1901, when it was found to contain the bones of men, dogs and oxen.
Cairnpapple Henge		Bathgate	West Lothian	3000 BC	Tomb	A Class II henge constructed around 3000 BC. It is designated a scheduled ancient monument with a small visitor centre.
Quoyness cairn		Sanday	Orkney	2900 BC	Tomb	An arc of Bronze Age mounds surrounds this cairn.
Maeshowe		Stenness	Orkney	2800 BC	Tomb	The entrance passage is 36 feet (11 m) long and leads to the central chamber measuring about 15 feet (4.6 m) on each side.
Stanydale Temple		Mainland	Shetland	2500–2000 BC	Possibly a residence	The only surviving megalithic structure from prehistoric Shetland.
Crantit cairn		Kirkwall	Orkney	2130 BC	Tomb	Discovered in 1998 near Kirkwall.
Rubha an Dùnain passage grave		Skye	Highland	2000 BC or older	Tomb	On a now uninhabited peninsula to the south of the Cuillin hills.
Wideford Hill chambered cairn		Kirkwall	Orkney	2000 BC	Tomb	Similar to Maeshowe in design. The tomb was excavated in the 1840s by Flinders Petrie.
Corrimony chambered cairn		Drumnadrochit	Highland	2000 BC or older	Tomb	A Clava-type passage grave surrounded by a circle of 11 standing stones.
Balnuaran of Clava		Nairn	Highland	2000 BC	Tomb	The largest of three is the north-east cairn, which was partially reconstructed in the 19th century. The central cairn may have been used as a funeral pyre.
Vinquoy chambered cairn		Eday	Orkney	2000 BC	Tomb	At an elevated location on the north end of the island.
Glebe cairn		Kilmartin Glen	Argyll and Bute	1700 BC	Tomb	An early Bronze Age structure with two stone cists.

=== Iron Age ===
Building	Image	Location	Council area	First built	Use	Notes
Dun Ringill		Strathaird, Skye	Highland	1st millennium BC	Semi-broch	Known to have been occupied in the medieval period by Clan Mackinnon. The ground floor living space is only 47 square metres.
Old Scatness		Sumburgh	Shetland	400–200 BC	Broch and wheelhouse	Like Jarlshof the site was occupied by Iron Age peoples, Picts, and Vikings.
Dun Troddan		Glenelg	Highland	4th century BC to 1st century AD	Broch	One of the best-preserved brochs, the dry-stone walls surviving to over 7 m in height in places.
Dun Telve		Glenelg	Highland	4th century BC to 1st century AD	Broch	The best preserved mainland broch, with walls surviving to 10 m, located only 500 metres from Dun Troddan.
Jarlshof		Sumburgh	Shetland	200 BC	Various	A complex of preserved wheelhouses, amongst the remains of a variety of much older and more recent buildings.
Yarrows broch		Wick	Highland	200 BC	Broch	Situated on the edge of a loch, underwater stonework may indicate a docking area.
Dun Vulan		Bornais	Na h-Eileanan Siar	150 BC	Broch	Originally 10 metres (33 ft) in height, now reduced to walls of 1.52 metres (5.0 ft). A Pictish house was later built within the walls.
Dun Ardtreck		Minginish, Skye	Highland	115 BC	Semi-broch	Initial occupation appears to have been brief and to have "ended in violence and destruction". (Note: The excavator, Euan MacKie, identified two successive visits to the site by a Roman fleet during Governor Agricola's campaigns in the AD 80s. The first resulted in presents for the chief but the second in the burning and destruction of the site. The fort guards the entrance of Loch Harport which may be the Roman harbour Portus Trucculensis mentioned by Tacitus.)
Broch of Mousa		Mousa	Shetland	100 BC	Broch	Amongst the best-preserved prehistoric buildings in Europe.
Ness of Burgi fort		Sumburgh	Shetland	100 BC	Blockhouse fort	Surviving to only 1.5 m in height, the blockhouse was once 22m long, but has suffered from cliff erosion.
Midhowe Broch		Rousay	Orkney	1st century BC or older	Settlement	Lies opposite the Broch of Gurness overlooking Eynhallow Sound.
Broch of Burrian		North Ronaldsay	Orkney	1st century BC	Broch	May have had three distinct phases of occupation.
Dun Beag		Bracadale, Skye	Highland	Late 1st millennium BC	Broch	Visited by Boswell and Johnson in the 18th century.
Mine Howe		Tankerness	Orkney	100BC - 110AD	Souterrain	Once thought to be a broch, it was used for metal working and may have had a religious purpose.
Broch of Gurness		Evie	Orkney	60 AD or older	Settlement	Oldest confirmed dates are Roman pottery from 60 AD and radiocarbon dates for the late first century.
Dun Mor Vaul		Tiree	Argyll and Bute	60 AD	Dun	The original structure dates to c. 445 BC. A fragment of a Roman glass bowl made in the Rhineland between AD 160 and 250 was discovered in the interior. (Note: This broch was excavated in 1962-64 by Euan MacKie. It was the first to be radiocarbon-dated, the first to revealed deposits dating from its construction and the first to reveal evidence for deliberate demolition. New C14 dates may shortly be available.)
Broch of West Burrafirth		East of Sandness	Shetland	100 AD or older	Broch	The stone stands eight or nine courses high for much of the circumference.
Antonine Wall		Central Lowlands	Falkirk, North Lanarkshire, East Dunbartonshire, West Dunbartonshire, and Renfrewshire	142 AD	Defensive Fortification	A defensive Wall built by the Roman Empire to mark the north-west frontier of the empire and to protect Britannia from the Caledonian tribes. The wall was abandoned in 162 AD.
Dun Fiadhairt		Duirinish, Skye	Highland	200 AD or older	Broch	A terracotta model of a bale of wool found at the site may reflect trade between the area and Romanised Britain.
Edin's Hall Broch		Abbey St Bathans	Scottish Borders	100-140AD	Broch	Broch believed to have been constructed between the two Roman occupations of southern Scotland, on the site of a much earlier fort.
Dun Fiadhairt		Duirinish, Skye	Highland	200 AD or older	Broch	A clay model of a bale of wool, believed to be Roman, may reflect trade between the two cultures although a Roman fleet is known to have circumnavigated Scotland in the 1st century AD.
Broch of Borwick		Yesnaby	Orkney	200 AD?	Broch	On a cliff promontory, the seaward wall is badly eroded.
Tappoch Broch		Torwood	Falkirk	3rd century AD?	Broch	Dating evidence is sparse, with no finds to link the broch to Roman occupation of nearby Antonine Wall resulting in the suggestion the broch either pre- or post- dates Roman occupation.
Dun Cuier		Barra	Na h-Eileanan Siar	4th century AD	Galleried dun	A complex and controversial site, with two periods of occupation in the 4th and 7th centuries.

=== Early Historic period ===
Building	Image	Location	Council area	First built	Use	Notes
St Columba's Monastery		Eileach an Naoimh	Argyll and Bute	7th century?	Monastic cells	The monastic site was founded in 542 and the earliest remains are likely pre-Norse. The oldest remains include a double beehive cell and a grave associated with the mother of Columba. These are the oldest extant church buildings in Scotland and possibly Britain.
Dun Carloway		Carloway	Na h-Eileanan Siar	650 and earlier	Broch	Radiocarbon date is for a late period of occupation likely to be centuries after the building was completed.
Brough of Birsay		Birsay	Orkney	800	Settlement	Pictish remains date from the 5th century and the Norse period provides building work from 800-1200.
St Oran's Chapel		Iona	Argyll and Bute	9th or 10th century	Chapel	Partly rebuilt and restored. Possibly built by Somerled c. 1164.
Brechin Cathedral Round Tower		Brechin	Angus	1012	Round Tower	The tower probably predates the cathedral itself.
Abernethy Round Tower		Abernethy	Perth and Kinross	1100	Round Tower	The tower is 22 metres (72 ft) high.

=== 12th century ===
Building	Image	Location	Council area	First built	Use	Notes
St Fillan's Church		Aberdour	Fife	1123	Church	The nave and chancel date from 1123. It was enlarged in the 15th century by the addition of a side aisle, and in the 17th by the small transeptual aisle. The church fell into disrepair in the 18th century and was restored in 1926.
St Rule's Tower		St Andrews	Fife	1123	Priory	Constructed by the Culdees prior to the granting of the church to the Augustinian order.
Inchcolm Abbey		Inchcolm	Fife	Founded 1123	Abbey	The substantial ruins date "from the 12th century" onwards.
Holyrood Abbey		Holyrood Palace	Edinburgh	c. 1130	Abbey	Founded in 1128 by David I but all that remains above ground of the original structure is the ruined nave. The rest of the building was replaced by the mid 13th century.
St Margaret's Chapel		Edinburgh Castle	Edinburgh	1130	Chapel	The oldest building in Edinburgh.
Cubbie Roo's Castle		Wyre	Orkney	c. 1145	Castle	The ruins include a small square keep still extant to 2.4 metres (8 ft) in height.
Castle Sween		Knapdale	Argyll and Bute	c. 1150	Castle	The main structure is a mid-12th-century quadrangle with later towers.
St Serf's Inch Priory		St Serf's Inch	Perth and Kinross	Post 1150	Priory	The remaining oblong structure dates from 12th century.
Jedburgh Abbey		Jedburgh	Scottish Borders	Post 1150	Abbey	The choir dates to the second quarter of the 12th century and the church was complete by the middle of the 13th century.
St. Magnus Cathedral		Kirkwall	Orkney	Commenced 1167	Cathedral	The building was raised in honour of Magnus Erlendsson, Earl of Orkney by Earl Rögnvald Kali.
Bishop's Palace, Kirkwall		Kirkwall	Orkney	c. 1167	Residence	Built for William the Old, Bishop of Orkney, Haakon IV of Norway died here in 1263.
Kilwinning Abbey		Kilwinning	North Ayrshire	1190	Abbey	An arch has a Norman style capital bearing two carved figures.
St Magnus Church		Egilsay	Orkney	Late 12th century	Church	A church existed here in 1116, but the current building, with its distinctive round tower, may date from later that century.
Kildalton Chapel		Islay	Argyll and Bute	Late 12th century	Church	The churchyard has a collection of grave slabs and contains the 8th-century Kildalton Cross.
St Blane's Church, Kingarth		Kingarth	Argyll and Bute	12th century	Church	A "12th-century Romanesque building consisting of a nave and chancel", the enclosing wall and parts of the church may be pre-Norse.

== 13th century ==
=== Castles ===
Building	Image	Location	Council Area	First Built	Use	Notes
Aberdour Castle		Aberdour	Fife	1200	Castle	Base of a late-12th- or early-13th-century hall house incorporated into later buildings.
Dirleton Castle		Dirleton	East Lothian	1240	Castle	The de Vaux towers are the oldest extant structures.
Kildrummy Castle		Kildrummy	Aberdeenshire	c. 1250	Castle	Built mid 13th century, possibly by Gilbert de Moravia and fell under siege in 1306 during the Wars of Independence.
Dunstaffnage Castle		Dunbeg, near Oban	Argyll and Bute	pre 1275	Castle	Built by Clan MacDougall on an older site.
Duart Castle		Craignure, Mull	Argyll and Bute	Late 13th century	Castle	Part of a chain of castles that line the Sound of Mull.
Lauriston Castle		St Cyrus	Aberdeenshire	Late 13th century	Castle	The charter dates from c. 1243, and some of the 13th-century structure is incorporated in later building works. Captured by Edward III of England in 1336.
Goblin Ha'		Gifford	East Lothian	13th century	Undercroft	Part of Yester Castle built by Sir Hugo de Gifford, reputedly a "wizard".

=== Religious buildings ===
Building	Image	Location	Council Area	First Built	Use	Notes
Iona Nunnery		Iona	Argyll and Bute	Founded 1207	Nunnery	"The remains, substantial and, at least in part, original were repaired in 1923".
Iona Abbey		Iona	Argyll and Bute	1200-1220	Monastery	The north transept "is the only part of this early church to survive reasonably intact".
Pluscarden Abbey		Elgin	Moray	Founded 1230	Monastery	Originally Valliscaulian, now a Benedictine House.
Ardchattan Priory		Ardchattan	Argyll and Bute	Founded 1230	Monastery	Also Valliscaulian, and dedicated to St May and St John the Baptist. Now ruined.
Fortrose Cathedral		Fortrose	Highland	1235	Undercroft	The undercroft of the chapter house is only structure remaining from this date.
Inchmahome Priory		Inchmahome	Stirling	Founded 1238	Priory	"Much of the 13th-century building remains."
Nave Island Chapel		Islay	Argyll and Bute	Pre 1250	Church	The site is within an enclosure that is likely to be several centuries older, The chimney is an 18th-century addition made by kelp harvesters.
Kelso Abbey		Kelso	Scottish Borders	Completed 1248	Abbey	Suffered significant damage during "The Rough Wooing".
Arbroath Abbey		Arbroath	Angus	Completed mid-13th century	Abbey	The tower dates from the 13th century.
Crossraguel Abbey		Maybole	South Ayrshire	Completed c. 1265	Abbey	
Beauly Priory		Beauly	Highland	Completed 1272	Monastery	Described by the monks as Prioratus de Bello Loco in 1230.
Sweetheart Abbey		New Abbey	Dumfries and Galloway	Founded 1273	Abbey	A Cistercian monastery founded in 1275 by Dervorguilla of Galloway.
Dunstaffnage Chapel		Oban	Argyll and Bute	pre 1275	Chapel	Adjacent to Dunstaffnage Castle.
Balmerino Abbey		Balmerino	Fife	Completed c. 1286	Abbey	Founded in 1231, badly damaged in the 16th century.
Culross Abbey		Culross	Fife	Late 13th century	Abbey	Founded before 1217, parts of the nave are early-13th-century, but most of the original structures are c. 1300.

== By council area ==
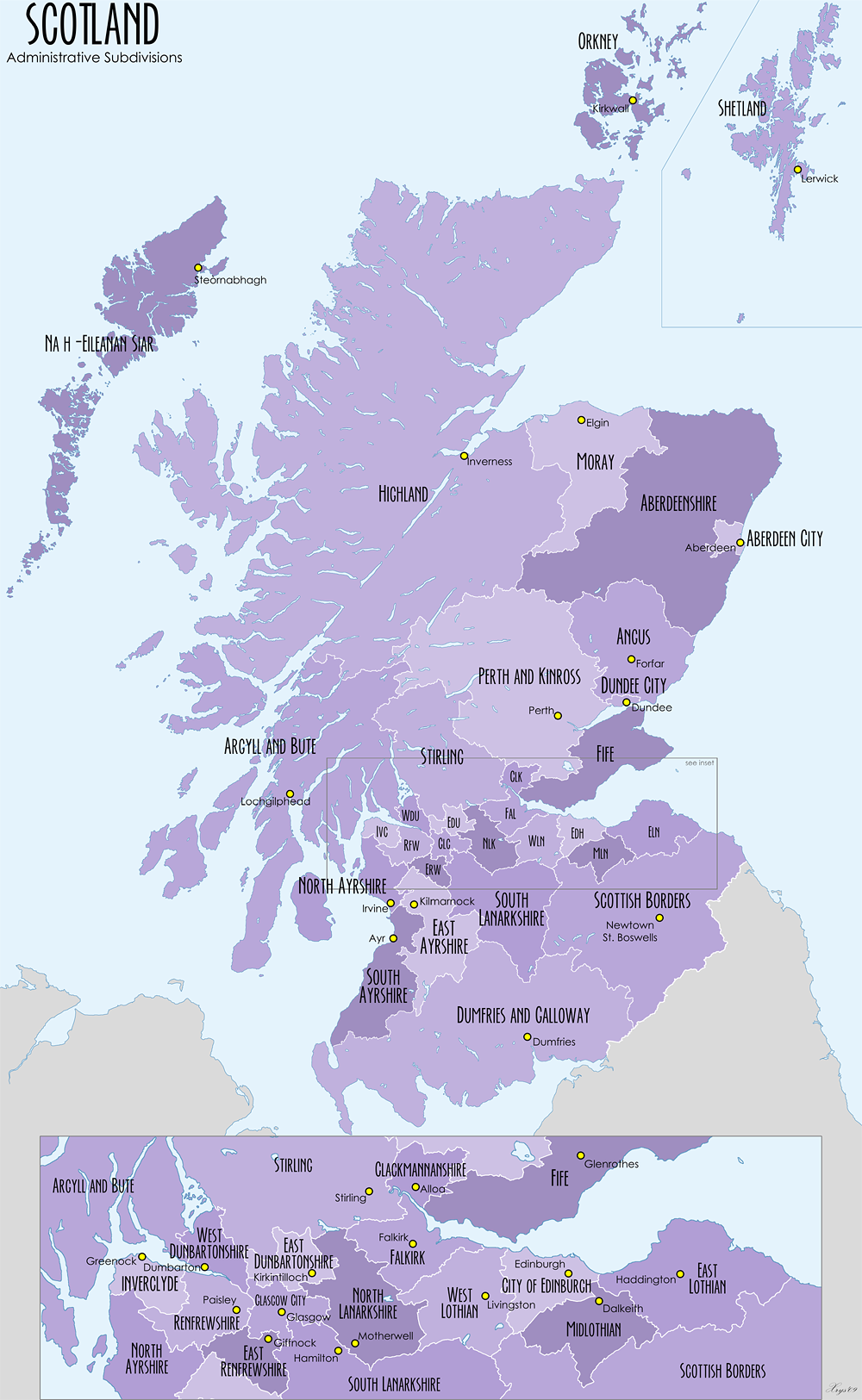

The following are amongst the oldest buildings in each council area of Scotland.

Building	Image	Location	Council area	Year built	Use	Notes
St Machar's Cathedral		Old Aberdeen	Aberdeen City	1440	Church	The nave and its two western towers were built between 1422 and 1440. (Note: Brig o' Balgownie was originally constructed in the 14th century by Richard Cementarius but was "largely rebuilt" in the early 17th century. Provost Skene's House in Broad Street dates from 1545 and is probably the oldest house in the city.)
Kildrummy Castle		Kildrummy	Aberdeenshire	c. 1250	Castle	Built mid 13th century, possibly by Gilbert de Moravia and fell under siege in 1306 during the Wars of Independence.
Brechin Cathedral Round Tower		Brechin	Angus	1012	Round Tower	The tower probably predates the cathedral itself.
Glebe cairn		Kilmartin Glen	Argyll and Bute	1700 BC	Tomb	An early Bronze Age structure with two stone cists.
Clackmannan Tower		Clackmannan	Clackmannanshire	Late 14th century	Tower house	L-plan tower house extended in the 15th century. (Note: Tullibody Old Bridge, which dates from the early 16th century has been described as "the oldest structure in Clackmannanshire" by Clackmannanshire Council.)
Sweetheart Abbey		New Abbey	Dumfries and Galloway	Founded 1273	Abbey	A Cistercian monastery founded in 1275 by Dervorguilla of Galloway.
St Mary's Tower		Nethergate	Dundee City	1495	Church	Also known as "The Old Steeple" and described as "the oldest surviving building in Dundee".
Mauchline Castle		Mauchline	East Ayrshire	1450	Former grange	Built by Andrew Hunter, abbot of Melrose Abbey.
Bardowie Castle		Bardowie, between Bearsden, Milngavie, and Torrance	East Dunbartonshire	1566	Castle	16th-century tower with later additions.
Dirleton Castle		Dirleton	East Lothian	1240	Castle	The de Vaux towers are the oldest extant structures.
Mearns Castle		Newton Mearns	East Renfrewshire	Post 1449	Tower house	Restored and now used by a local church.
St Margaret's Chapel		Edinburgh Castle	City of Edinburgh	1130	Chapel	
Tappoch Broch		Torwood	Falkirk	3rd century	Broch	Likely post dates Roman occupation of nearby Antonine Wall.
St Rule's Tower		St Andrews	Fife	1123	Priory	Constructed by the Culdees prior to the granting of the church to the Augustinian order.
Glasgow Cathedral		Glasgow	Glasgow	mid-12th century	Cathedral	
Grey Cairns of Camster		Upper Camster	Highland	3000 BC or older	Tomb	A group of three cairns.
Newark Castle		Port Glasgow	Inverclyde	1478	Castle	The original castle had a tower house within a barmkin entered through a large gatehouse.
Crichton Castle		Crichton	Midlothian	Late 14th century	Tower house	The tower is the oldest section, with later additions.
Pluscarden Abbey		Elgin	Moray	Founded 1230	Monastery	Originally Valliscaulian, now a Benedictine House.
Barpa Langass		North Uist	Na h-Eileanan Siar	3000 BC	Tomb	The best preserved chambered cairn in the Hebrides.
Kilwinning Abbey		Kilwinning	North Ayrshire	1190	Abbey	An arch has a Norman style capital bearing two carved figures.
Dalzell House		Motherwell	North Lanarkshire	Early 16th century	Tower house	Substantial later additions.
Knap of Howar		Papa Westray	Orkney	3700 BC	House	Oldest preserved stone house in north west Europe.
Abernethy Round Tower		Abernethy	Perth and Kinross	Late 11th century	Tower	The tower is 22 metres (72 ft) high.
Paisley Abbey		Paisley	Renfrewshire	Mid 15th century	Abbey	The main structure is a restoration of an earlier building destroyed in 1307, although a late-12th-century and a 13th-century doorway remain.
Jedburgh Abbey		Jedburgh	Scottish Borders	Post 1150	Abbey	The choir dates to the second quarter of the 12th century and the church was complete by the middle of the 13th century.
Old Scatness		Sumburgh	Shetland	400-200 BC	Broch and wheelhouse	Like Jarlshof the site was occupied by Iron Age peoples, Picts, and Vikings.
Crossraguel Abbey		Maybole	South Ayrshire	c. 1265	Abbey	
Bothwell Parish Church		Bothwell	South Lanarkshire	Founded 1398	Church	Formerly St Brides Collegiate Church. The oldest visible structure is the choir, which dates from the 14th century.
Inchmahome Priory		Inchmahome	Stirling	Founded 1238	Priory	"Much of the 13th-century building remains."
Glencairn House		Dumbarton	West Dunbartonshire	1623	Tenement	Built for the Earl of Glencairn, now owned by the Council and described as "oldest building in West Dunbartonshire".
Torphichen Preceptory		Torphichen	West Lothian	13th century	Church	The only house of the Knights Hospitallers of St John of Jerusalem in Scotland. (Note: According to RCAHMS, Abercorn church dates "from the later 11th century and has been much altered" and "the only feature certainly of that date is the blocked S door".)

== Other structures ==
=== Undated buildings ===
The following are very old buildings that meet the qualifying criteria but for which no reliable date of construction has emerged.

Building	Image	Location	Council Area	First Built	Use	Notes
Calf of Eday cairns		Calf of Eday	Orkney	Neolithic and built in two phases.	Tomb	There are two preserved chambered tombs close together on this Orkney islet and a third in a ruinous state.
Huntersquoy cairn		Eday	Orkney	Neolithic	Tomb	A Bookan type cairn with an upper and lower storey.
Broch of Culswick		Sandsting	Shetland	Iron Age	Broch	Until the 18th century this was Shetland's second most complete broch, after Mousa.
Burra Ness Broch		Yell	Shetland	Iron Age	Broch	The wall still stands 14' high in places.
Burroughston Broch		Shapinsay	Orkney	Iron Age	Settlement	Likely to "have been seen by seafaring Romans about two millennia ago."
Carn Liath		Golspie	Highland	Iron Age	Broch	
Clachtoll broch		Stoer	Highland	Iron Age	Broch	
Dun Dornaigil		South of Ben Hope	Highland	Iron Age	Broch	
Dun Hallin		Waternish, Skye	Highland	Iron Age	Broch	
Dun Grugaig		Glenelg	Highland	Iron Age	Semi-broch	
Kintradwell broch		Brora	Highland	Iron Age	Broch	
Sallachy broch		Lairg	Highland	Iron Age	Broch	
Stairhaven		Luce Bay	Dumfries and Galloway	Probable Iron Age	Possible broch	Also known as Crow's Neith and Broken Castle.
Tirefour Castle		Lismore	Argyll and Bute	Iron Age	Broch	The walls have an average thickness of 4.5 metres (15 ft) enclosing a court about 12.2 metres (40 ft) in diameter. The wall still stands 3 metres (9.8 ft) high.
Burghead Well		Burghead	Moray	Dark Age?	Baptistery?	This underground structure is unique in a Scottish context and is probably of Dark Age origin, although it may be older.
Restenneth Priory		Forfar	Angus	13th century?	Monastery	Probably built on a much earlier site and the date of the extant structures is not clear.

=== Other prehistoric constructions ===
The following are very old human constructions that do not fit the above criteria for a building.

Building	Image	Location	Council area	First built	Use	Notes
Funzie Girt		Fetlar	Shetland	Possibly Neolithic	Wall	The wall ran for over 4 kilometres (2.5 mi) and once divided the island in two. "Its date and precise purpose are unknown, but a considerable degree of antiquity is suggested."
Dwarfie Stane		Hoy	Orkney	3rd millennium BC	Tomb	A megalithic chambered tomb carved out of a titanic block of Devonian Old Red Sandstone.

== See also ==
- Architecture of Scotland in the Prehistoric era
- Timeline of prehistoric Scotland
- Oldest buildings in the United Kingdom
- List of oldest known surviving buildings
- Newgrange, one of Ireland's oldest buildings dating from c. 3100 BC
- La Hougue Bie, one of Jersey's oldest buildings dating from c. 3500 BC
