= Architecture of Scotland in the prehistoric era =

Buildings of Scotland in the Prehistoric era

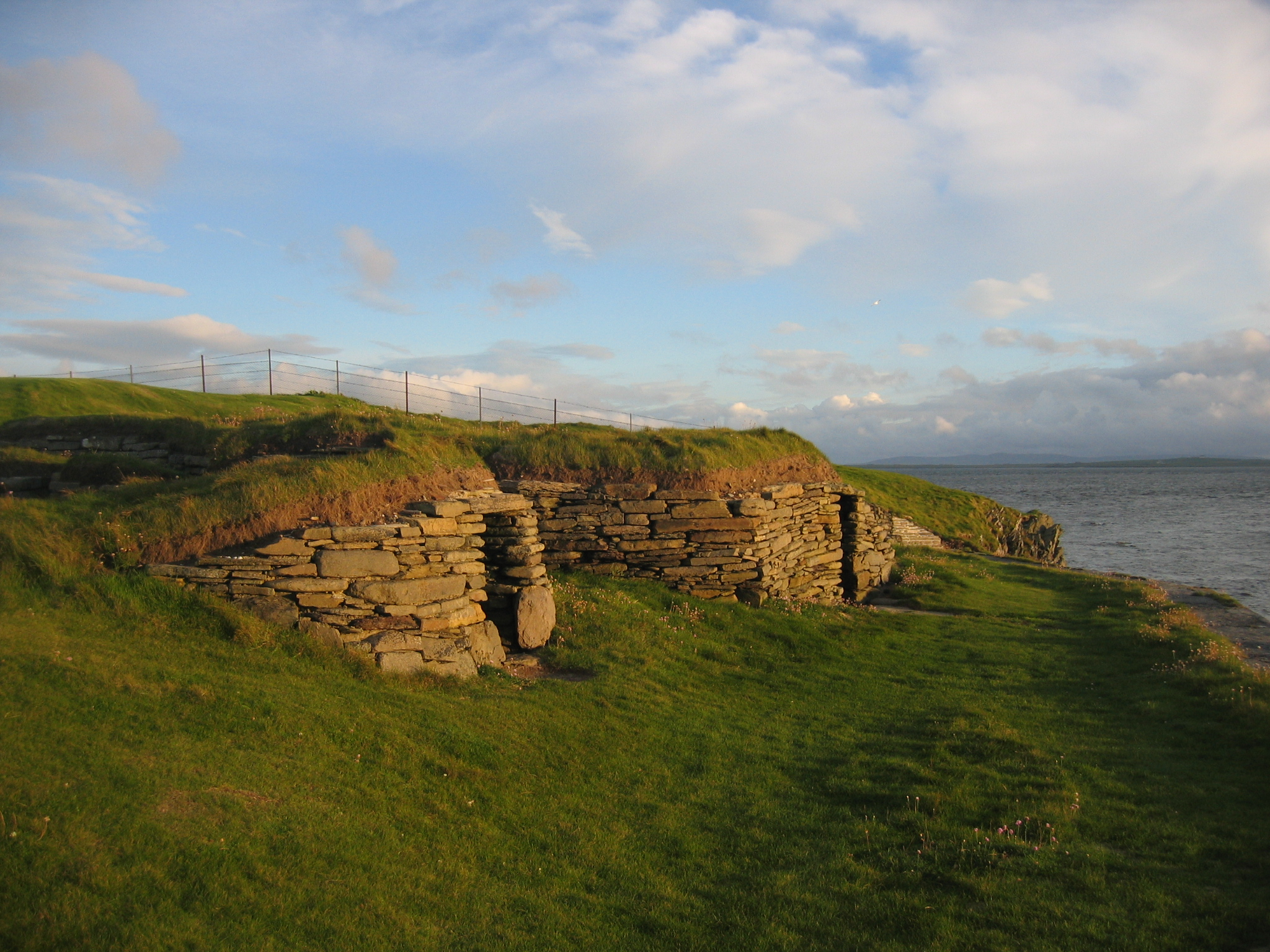
The stone building at Knap of Howar, Orkney, one of the oldest surviving houses in north-west Europe

The architecture of Scotland in the prehistoric era includes all human building within the modern borders of Scotland, before the arrival of the Romans in Britain in the first century BCE. Stone Age settlers began to build in wood in what is now Scotland from at least 8,000 years ago. The first permanent houses of stone were constructed around 6,000 years ago, as at Knap of Howar, Orkney and settlements like Skara Brae. There are also large numbers of chambered tombs and cairns from this era, particularly in the west and north. In the south and east there are earthen barrows, often linked to timber monuments of which only remnants remain. Related structures include bank barrows, cursus monuments, mortuary enclosures and timber halls. From the Bronze Age there are fewer new buildings, but there is evidence of crannogs, roundhouses built on artificial islands and of Clava cairns and the first hillforts. From the Iron Age there is evidence of substantial stone Atlantic roundhouses, which include broch towers, smaller duns. There is also evidence of about 1,000 hillforts in Scotland, most located below the Clyde-Forth line.

== Stone Age ==
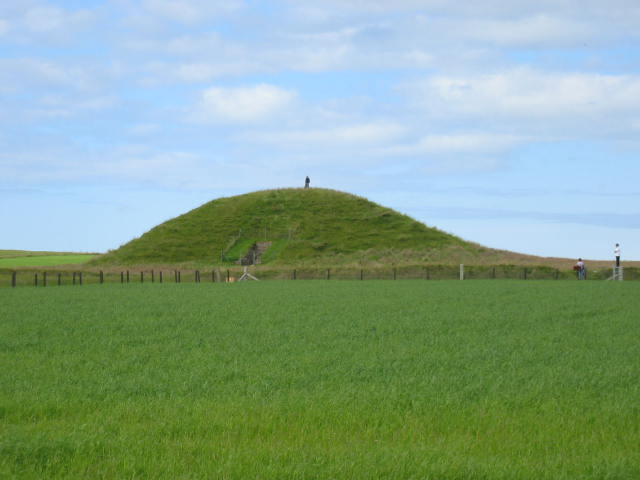
Maes Howe, a passage grave on Orkney

The oldest house for which there is evidence in Britain is the oval structure of wooden posts found at South Queensferry near the Firth of Forth, dating from the Mesolithic period, about 8240 BCE. The earliest stone structures are probably the three hearths found at Jura, dated to about 6000 BCE. With the development of agriculture, groups of settlers began building stone houses on what is now Scottish soil in the Neolithic era, around 6,000 years ago, and the first villages around 500 years later. Neolithic habitation, burial and ritual sites are particularly common and well-preserved in the Northern and Western Isles, where a lack of trees led to most structures being built of local stone. The stone building at Knap of Howar at Papa Westray, Orkney is one of the oldest surviving houses in north-west Europe, making use of locally gathered rubble in a dry-stone construction, it was probably occupied for 900 years, between 3700 and 2800 BCE. Skara Brae on the Mainland of Orkney also dates from this era, occupied from about 3100 to 2500 BCE and is Europe's most complete Neolithic village.

There are also large numbers of chambered tombs and cairns from this period. Many different types have been identified, but they can be roughly grouped into passage graves, gallery graves and stone cists. Cists are relatively simple box-like graves, usually made up of stone slabs and covered with a large stone or slab. Maes Howe, near Stenness on the mainland of Orkney (dated 3400–3200 BCE) and Monamore, Isle of Arran (dated approximately 3500 BCE) are passage graves, of megalith construction, built with large stones, many of which weigh several tons. Gallery graves are rectangular gallery-like spaces, where the entrance at one end is the width of the gallery. These were sometimes lined or roofed with slabs and then covered with earth. Among the most impressive surviving monuments of the period are the first sets of standing stones in Scotland, such as those at Stenness on the mainland of Orkney, which date from about 3100 BCE, of four stones, the tallest of which is 16 feet (5 m) in height.

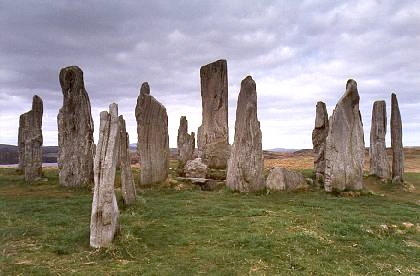
The Callanish Stones, one of the finest stone circles in Scotland

In contrast to the Highlands and Islands where stone was extensively used, in the south and east the most visible architectural survivals of the Neolithic are mainly earthen barrows, the earliest probably dating from the beginning of the fourth millennium BCE. Today these monuments consist of massive mounds of earth or stone, most commonly trapezoidal in plan and often orientated to the east. They are widely distributed in the Lowlands, particularly in Aberdeenshire, Angus, Dumfries and Galloway and the Scottish Borders. Related structures include bank barrows, cursus monuments, mortuary enclosures, timber halls, and other forms of enclosure. Bank barrows are parallel-sided mounds, usually flanked by ditches on either side. Originally believed to be Roman in origin, cursus monuments also consist of long parallel lengths of banks of earth with external ditches, but with an open avenue or enclose between. Both forms are usually associated with burial chambers. Examples of bank barrows in Scotland include from Perthshire the long mound at Auchenlaich and the hybrid bank barrow/cursus monument at Cleaven Dyke, which stretches for over 1.5 miles (2 km). Mortuary enclosures are usually sub-rectangular banks with external ditches and raised platforms of stone or wood within them, thought by J. G. Scott to be used for the exposure of corpses prior to burial elsewhere, although this interpretation is disputed. Remains of mortuary enclosures of this period are often found under long barrows. Key examples include Pitnacree, Perthshire and two closely related sites at Lochhill and Slewcairn, both in Kirkcudbright. The timber halls are probably unique to Scotland and were massive roofed buildings made of oak, all of which seem to have been subsequently burnt down. There is debate as to the role of these buildings, which have been seen variously as regular farming homesteads of Neolithic families and as related to a series of monumental constructions such as barrows. The hall at Balbridie, Aberdeenshire was 85 feet (26 m) long, 43 feet (13 m) wide and may have had a roof 30 feet (9 m) high, making it large enough to accommodate up to 50 people.

== Bronze Age ==
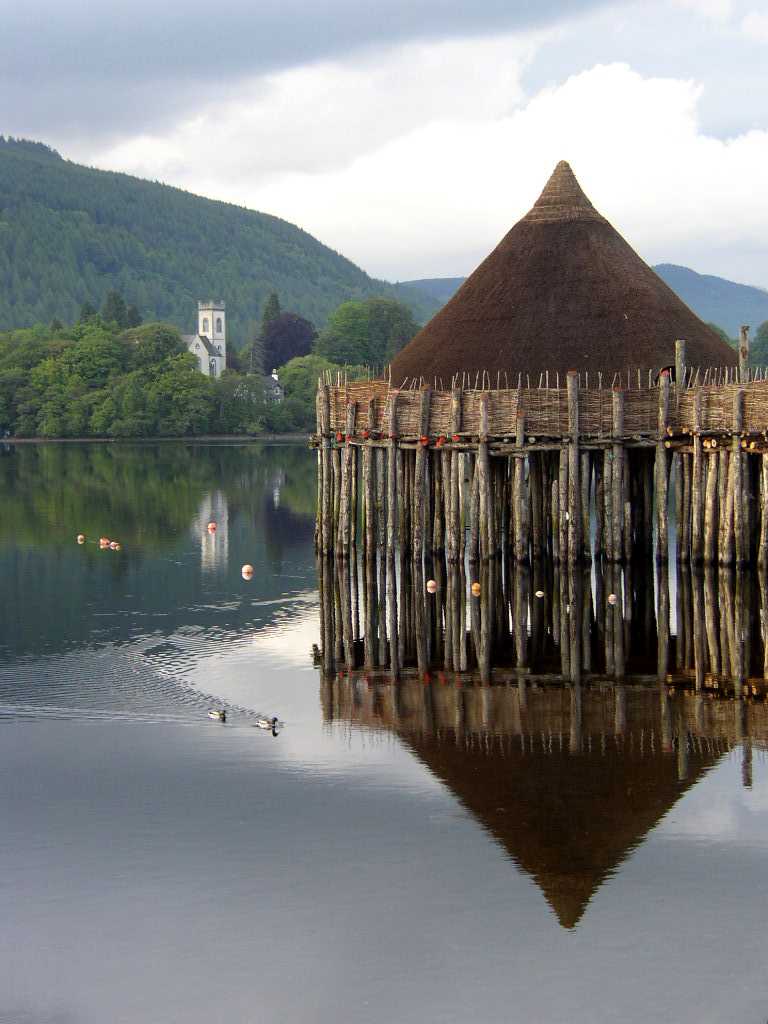
Reconstructed crannog on Loch Tay

As bronze working developed from about 2000 BCE, there was a decline in the building of large new structures, which, with a reduction of the total area under cultivation, suggests a fall in population. From the Early and Middle Bronze Age there is evidence of cellular round houses of stone, as at Jarlshof and Sumburgh in Shetland. At Jarlshof these are oval houses with thick stone walls, which may have been partly subterranean at the earliest period of inhabitation, a technique that provided both structural stability and insulation. There is also evidence of the occupation of crannogs, roundhouses partially or entirely built on artificial islands, usually in lakes, rivers and estuarine waters. They were often constructed of layers of brushwood and rubble. Sometimes they were revetted around the edges with vertical piles and sometimes surfaced with logs of oak.

The creation of cairns and Megalithic monuments continued into this period. There are approximately fifty Clava cairns in Scotland, named after those at Balnuaran of Clava near Inverness. They take two distinct forms, either a circular rubble enclosure known as "ring cairns", or passage graves, with a long entrance, usually in complex astronomical alignments. As elsewhere in Europe, hill forts were first introduced in this period, including the occupation of Eildon hill near Melrose in the Scottish Borders, from around 1000 BCE, which accommodated several hundred houses on a fortified hilltop, and Traprain Law in East Lothian, which had a 20-acre enclosure, sectioned in two places west of the summit, made up of a coursed, stone wall with a rubble core.

== Iron Age ==
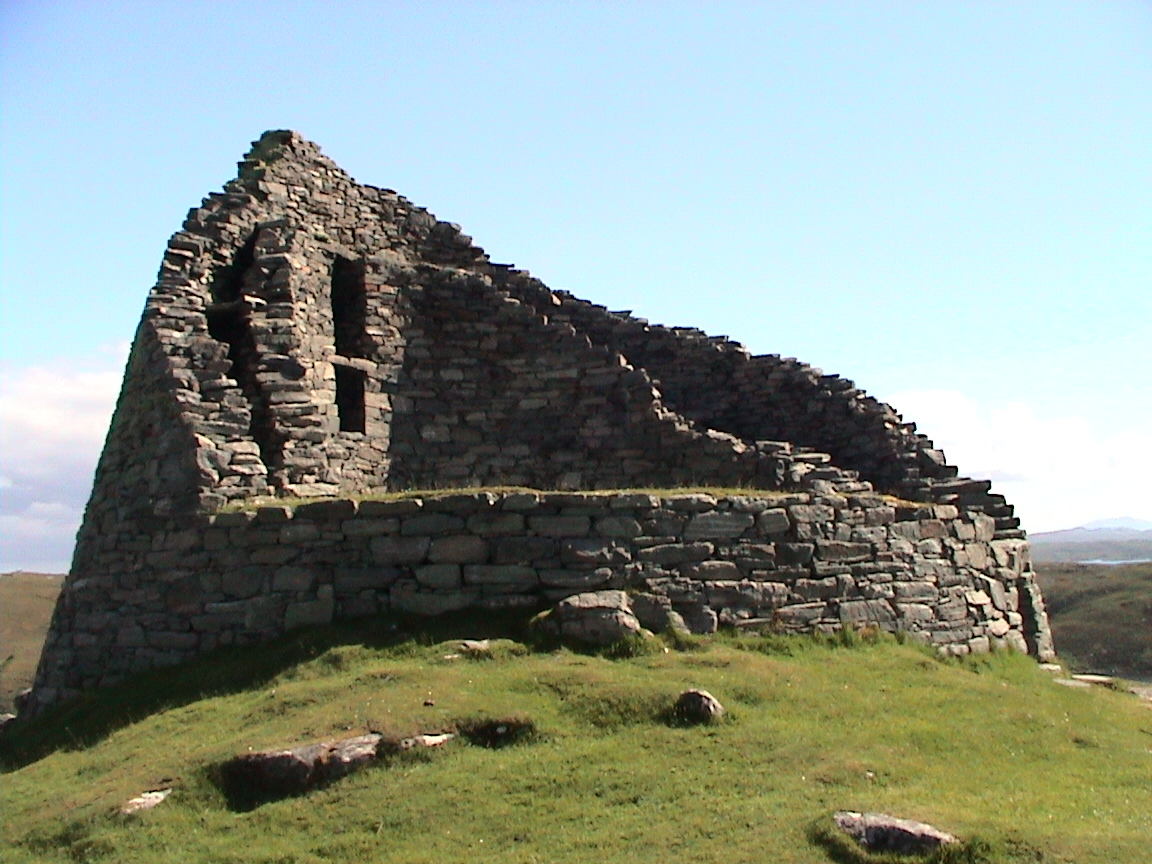
The ruins of Dun Carloway Iron Age broch

In the early Iron Age, from the seventh century BCE, cellular houses begin to be replaced on the northern isles by simple Atlantic roundhouses, substantial circular buildings with a drystone construction. Important examples are at Quanterness, Bu, Pierowall, and Tofts Ness on Orkney, and at Clickimin in Shetland. From about 400 BC more complex Atlantic roundhouses began to be built, as at Howe, Orkney and Crosskirk, Caithness.

The most massive constructions that date from this era are the circular broch towers, probably dating from about 200 BCE. They are drystone hollow-walled structures that are unique to Scotland. Most ruins only survive up to a few metres above ground level, although there are five extant examples of towers whose walls still exceed 21 feet (6 m) in height. There are at least 100 broch sites in Scotland, of which the best preserved include those at South Yarrows near Wick, Midhowe Broch on Orkney and the Broch of Clickimin and the Broch of Mousa in Shetland. Despite extensive research, their purpose and the nature of the societies that created them are still a matter of debate.

Archaeologists since the 1960s have distinguished brochs from smaller structures of similar construction, usually called duns. The heaviest evidence of the occupation of crannogs was in this era, but they would continue to be used until the Middle Ages. This period also saw the beginnings of wheelhouses, a roundhouse with a characteristic outer wall, within which was a circle of stone piers (bearing a resemblance to the spokes of a wheel), but these would flourish most in the era of Roman occupation. There is evidence for about 1,000 Iron Age hillforts in Scotland, most located below the Clyde-Forth line. The majority are circular, with a single palisade around an enclosure. Most are relatively small, covering one or two acres, but some are much larger as at Castle O'er, Birrenwark, Cadimuir, Cadroner and White Meldon. They appear to have been largely abandoned in the Roman period, but some seem to have been reoccupied after their departure.

== See also ==
- Oldest buildings in Scotland
- Timeline of prehistoric Scotland
