= Architecture of Scotland in the Middle Ages =

Types of architecture within Scotland in the Middle Ages

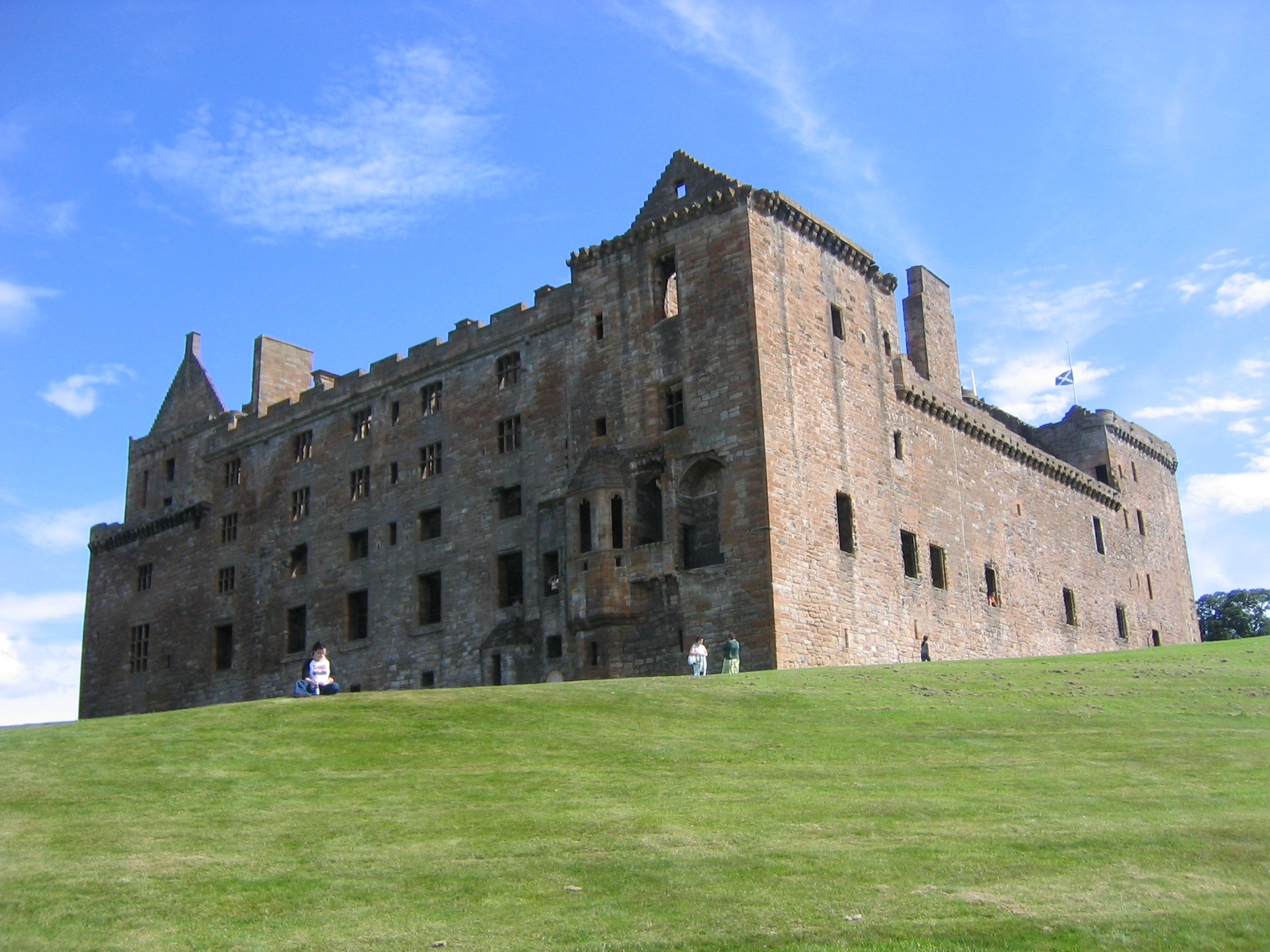
Linlithgow Palace, the first building to bear that title in Scotland, was extensively rebuilt along Renaissance principles from the fifteenth century.

The architecture of Scotland in the Middle Ages includes all buildings within the modern borders of Scotland, between the departure of the Romans from Northern Britain in the early fifth century and the adoption of the Renaissance in the early sixteenth century, and includes vernacular, ecclesiastical, royal, aristocratic and military constructions. The first surviving houses in Scotland go back 9500 years. There is evidence of different forms of stone and wooden houses exist and earthwork hill forts from the Iron Age. The arrival of the Romans led to the abandonment of many of these forts. After the departure of the Romans in the fifth century, there is evidence of the building of a series of smaller "nucleated" constructions sometimes utilizing major geographical features, as at Dunadd and Dumbarton. In the following centuries new forms of construction emerged throughout Scotland that would come to define the landscape.

Medieval vernacular architecture utilised local building materials, including cruck constructed houses, turf walls, and clay, with a heavy reliance on stone. Medieval parish church architecture was typically simpler than in England, but there were grander ecclesiastical buildings in the Romanesque and Gothic styles. From the early fifteenth century, the introduction of Renaissance styles included the selective use of Romanesque forms in church architecture, as in the nave of Dunkeld Cathedral. Castles arrived in Scotland with the introduction of feudalism in the twelfth century. Initially these were wooden motte-and-bailey constructions, but many were replaced by stone castles with a high curtain wall. In the late Middle Ages, new castles were built, some on a grander scale, and others, particularly in the borders, as simpler tower houses. Gunpowder weaponry led to the use of gun ports, platforms to mount guns and walls adapted to resist bombardment. There was a phase of Renaissance palace building from the late fifteenth century, beginning at Linlithgow.

== Background ==
The earliest surviving houses in Scotland go back around 9500 years, and the first villages 6000 years; Skara Brae on the Mainland of Orkney is the earliest preserved example in Europe. Crannogs, or roundhouses, each built on artificial islands, date from the Bronze Age, and stone buildings called Atlantic roundhouses and larger earthwork hill forts from the Iron Age. After the arrival of the Romans from about 71 AD, they appear to have been largely abandoned. The Romans build military forts like that at Trimontium, and a continuous fortification between the Firth of Forth and the Firth of Clyde known as the Antonine Wall, built in the second century AD. Beyond Roman influence, there is evidence of wheelhouses and underground souterrains. After the departure of the Romans in the third century, there is evidence of the reoccupation of Iron Age forts and of the building of a series of smaller "nucleated" constructions, sometimes utilising major geographical features, as at Dunadd and Dumbarton.

== Vernacular buildings ==
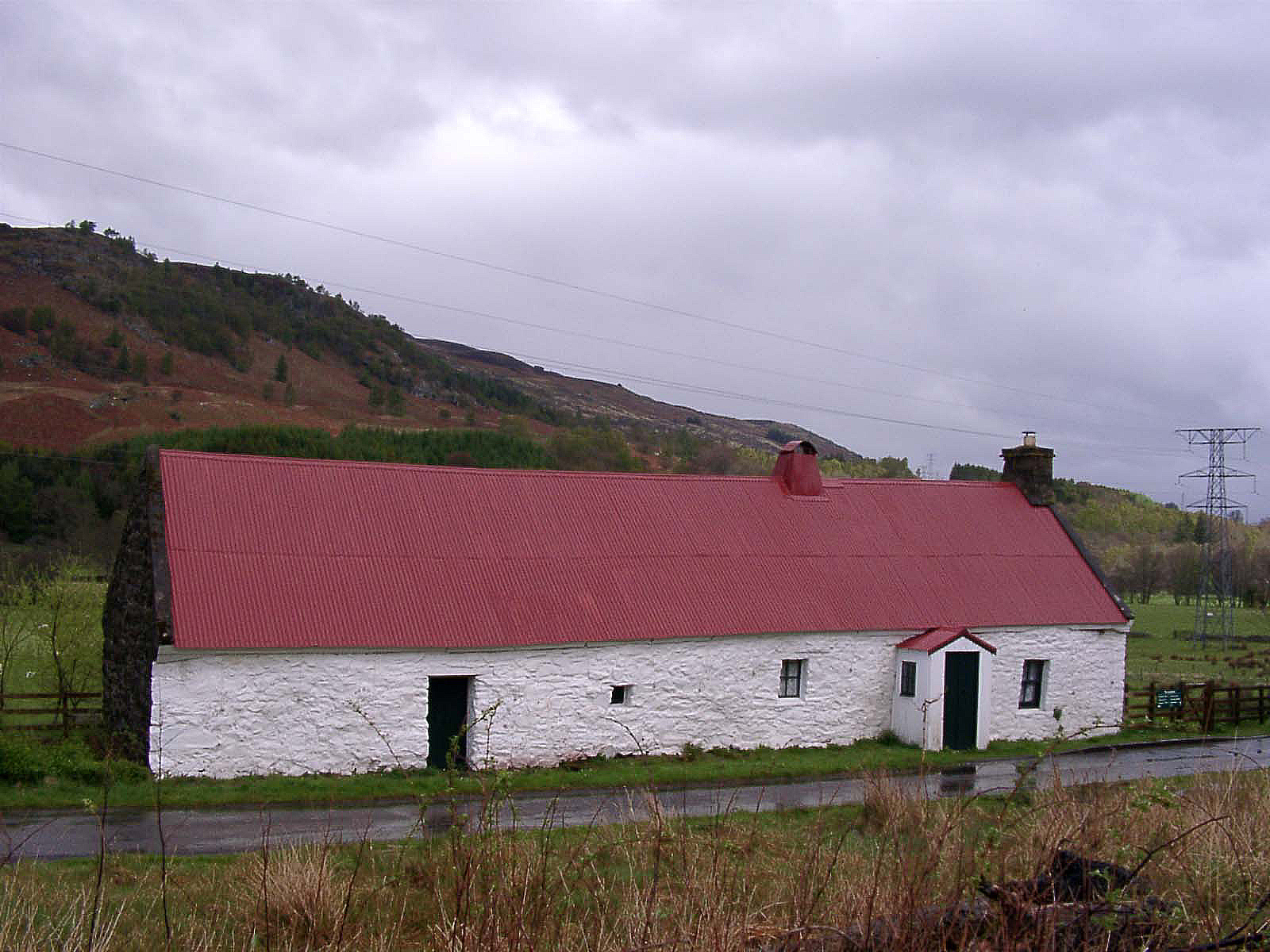
The Moirlanich Longhouse is a blackhouse built in the nineteenth century in the traditional manner with a cruck frame.

Medieval vernacular architecture in rural environments made use of local materials and styles. As in England, cruck construction was used, employing pairs of curved timbers to support the roof; however they were usually hidden from view. In rural areas there was extensive use of turf to fill in the walls, sometimes on a stone base, but they were not long lasting and had to be rebuilt frequently, perhaps as often as every two or three years. In some regions, including the south-west and around Dundee, solid clay walls were used, or combinations of clay, turf and straw, rendered with clay or lime to make them weatherproof. With a lack of long span structural timber, the most common building material was stone, employed in both mortared and dry stone construction. Different regions used broom, heather, straw, turfs or reeds for roofing.

From the twelfth century, burghs, towns that were granted certain legal privileges from the Crown, developed, particularly on the east coast with distinctive urban building patterns. They were typically surrounded by a palisade, and many had a castle. They usually had a market place, with a widened high street or junction, often marked by a mercat cross. There were houses for the nobles, burgesses and other significant inhabitants, which were often built in a relatively elaborate style and by the end of the period some would have slate roofs or tiles. Very little has survived of the houses of the urban poor. They were probably largely located in the backlands, away from the main street frontages. From Aberdeen and Perth there is evidence of nearly forty buildings dating from the twelfth to the fourteenth centuries, with walls of planks or wattles.

== Churches ==
The introduction of Christianity into Scotland from Ireland from the sixth century led to the construction of basic masonry-built churches, beginning on the west coast and islands. Medieval parish church architecture in Scotland was typically much less elaborate than in England, with many churches remaining simple oblongs, without transepts and aisles, and often without towers. In the Highlands they were often even simpler, many built of rubble masonry and sometimes indistinguishable from the outside from houses or farm buildings. However, from the eighth century, more sophisticated buildings emerged.

=== Romanesque ===
Early Romanesque ashlar masonry produced block-built stone buildings, like the eleventh century round tower at Brechin Cathedral and the square towers of Dunblane Cathedral and The Church of St Rule. After the eleventh century, as masonry techniques advanced, ashlar blocks became more rectangular, resulting in structurally more stable walls that could incorporate more refined architectural moulding and detailing that can be seen in corbelling, buttressing, lintels and arching. At the same time there were increasing influences from English and continental European designs. These can be seen in the Romanesque chevron pattern on the piers in the nave of Dunfermline Abbey (1130–40), which were modelled on details from Durham Cathedral. St Magnus Cathedral in Orkney, begun in 1137, may have employed masons that had worked at Durham. The arrival of the new monastic orders in Scotland from the twelfth century led to a boom in ecclesiastical building using English and continental forms, including abbeys at Kelso, Holyrood, Jedburgh and St Andrews.

=== Gothic ===
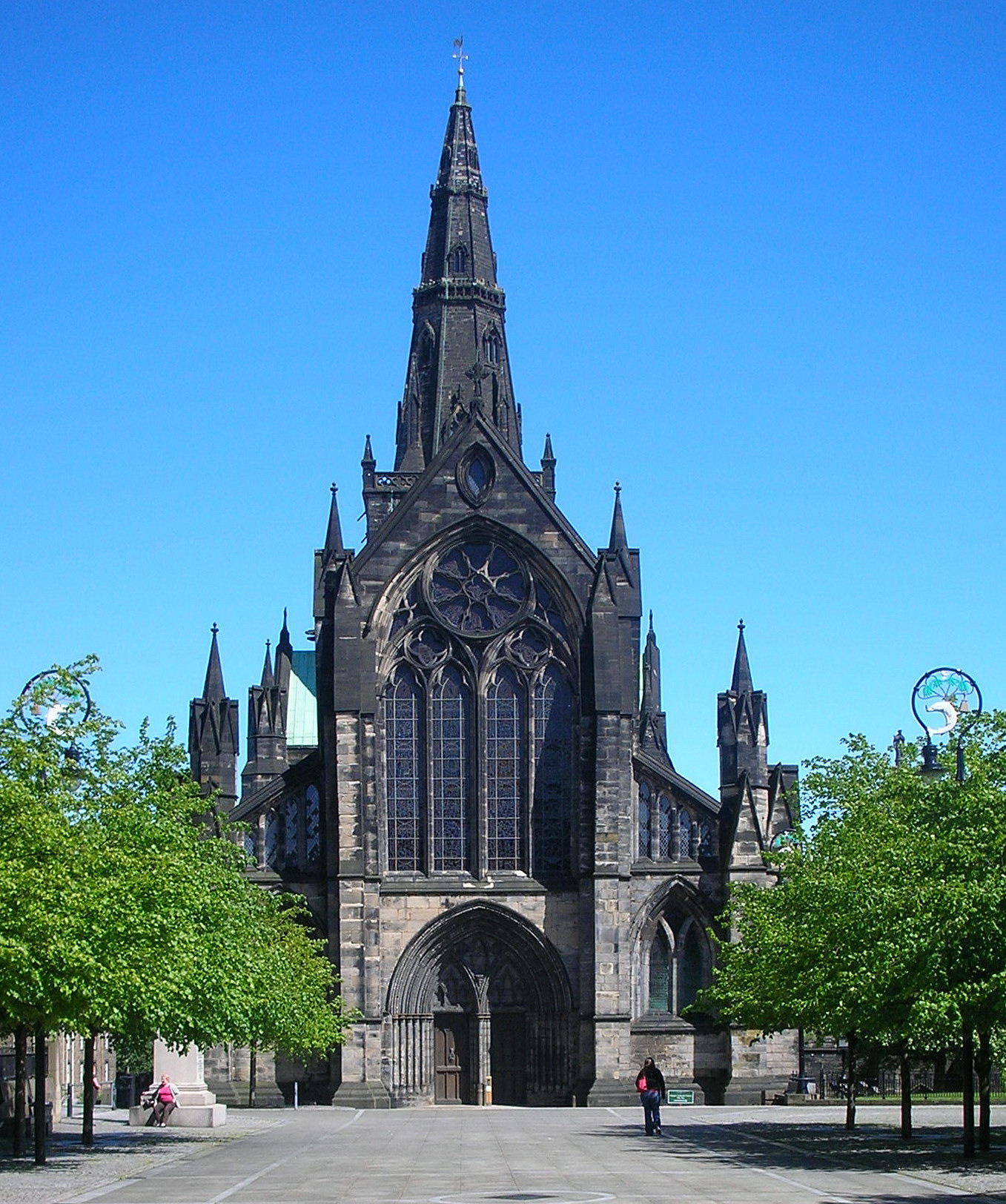
The Gothic front of Glasgow Cathedral

In the thirteenth century, the east end of Elgin Cathedral incorporated typical European Gothic mouldings and tracery. In the fifteenth century continental builders are known to have been working in Scotland. French master-mason John Morrow was employed at the building of Glasgow Cathedral and the rebuilding of Melrose Abbey, both considered fine examples of Gothic architecture. The interiors of churches were often elaborate before the Reformation, with highly decorated sacrament houses, like the ones surviving at Deskford and Kinkell. The carvings at Rosslyn Chapel, created in the mid-fifteenth century, elaborately depicting the progression of the seven deadly sins, are considered some of the finest in the Gothic style. Late Medieval Scottish churches also often contained elaborate burial monuments, like the Douglas tombs in the town of Douglas.

Late Gothic architecture saw a contrast with the Perpendicular style used in England. This can be seen in the re-adoption of low-massive church building with round arches and pillars, as at the nave of Dunkeld Cathedral, begun in 1406, the facade of St Mary's, Haddington from the 1460s and in the chapel of Bishop Elphinstone's Kings College, Aberdeen (1500–09). It may have been influenced by close contacts with Rome and the Netherlands, and was perhaps a conscious reaction against English forms in favour of continental ones. About forty collegiate churches were established in Scotland in the late fifteenth and early sixteenth centuries. Many, like Trinity College, Edinburgh, showed a combination of Gothic and Renaissance styles. The early sixteenth century saw crown steeples built on churches with royal connections, symbolising imperial monarchy, as at St. Giles Cathedral, Edinburgh.

== Castles ==
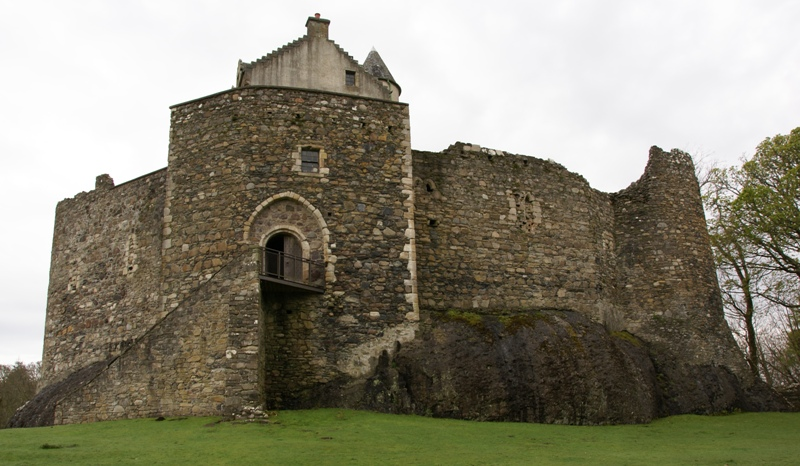
Dunstaffnage Castle is one of the oldest surviving "castles of enceinte", mostly dating from the thirteenth century.

Scotland is known for its dramatically placed castles, many of which date from the late medieval era. Castles, in the sense of a fortified residence of a lord or noble, arrived in Scotland as part of David I's encouragement of Norman and French nobles to settle with feudal tenures, particularly in the south and east, and were a way of controlling the contested lowlands. These were primarily wooden motte-and-bailey constructions, of a raised mount or motte, surmounted by a wooden tower and a larger adjacent enclosure or bailey, both usually surrounded by a fosse (a ditch) and palisade, and connected by a wooden bridge. They varied in size from the very large such as the Bass of Inverurie, to more modest designs like Balmaclellan. In England many of these constructions were converted into stone "keep-and-bailey" castles in the twelfth century, but in Scotland most of those that were in continued occupation became stone castles of "enceinte" from the thirteenth century, with a high embattled curtain wall. The need for thick and high walls for defence forced the use of economic building methods, often continuing the tradition of dry-stone rubble building, which were then covered with a lime render, or harled for weatherproofing and a uniform appearance. In addition to the baronial castles there were royal castles, often larger and providing defence, lodging for the itinerant Scottish court and a local administrative centre. By 1200 these included fortifications at Ayr and Berwick.

In the wars of Scottish Independence, Robert I adopted a policy of castle destruction, rather than allow fortresses to be easily retaken and then held by the English, beginning with his own castles at Ayr and Dumfries, and including Roxburgh and Edinburgh. After the Wars of Independence, new castles began to be built, often on a grander scale as "livery and maintenance" castles, to house retained troops, like Tantallon, Lothian and Doune near Stirling, rebuilt for Robert Stewart, Duke of Albany in the fourteenth century. Gunpowder weaponry fundamentally altered the nature of castle architecture, with existing castles being adapted to allow the use of gunpowder weapons by the incorporation of "keyhole" gun ports, platforms to mount guns and walls being adapted to resist bombardment. Ravenscraig, Kirkcaldy, begun about 1460, is probably the first castle in the British Isles to be built as an artillery fort, incorporating "D-shape" bastions that would better resist cannon fire and on which artillery could be mounted.

== Tower houses ==
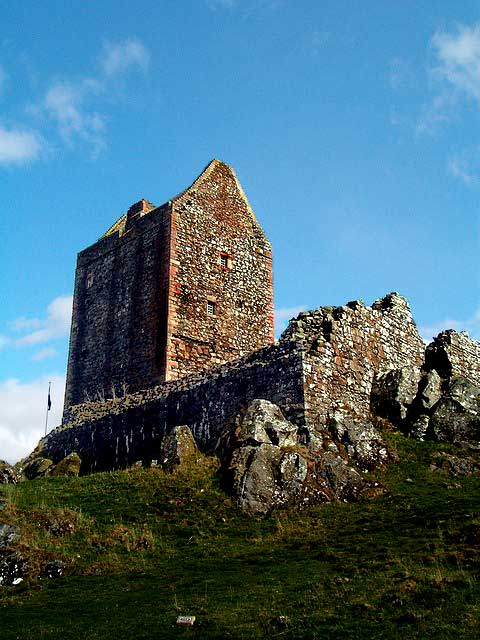
Smailholm Tower near Kelso in the Scottish Borders

The largest number of late medieval fortifications in Scotland built by nobles, about 800, were of the tower house design. Smaller versions of tower houses in southern Scotland were known as peel towers, or pele houses. The defences of tower houses were primarily aimed to provide protection against smaller raiding parties and were not intended to put up significant opposition to an organised military assault, leading historian Stuart Reid to characterise them as "defensible rather than defensive". They were typically a tall, square, stone-built, crenelated building; often also surrounded by a barmkin or bawn, a walled courtyard designed to hold valuable animals securely, but not necessarily intended for serious defence. They were built extensively on both sides of the border with England, and James IV's forfeiture of the Lordship of the Isles in 1494 led to an immediate burst of tower building across the region.

== Palaces ==
The extensive building and rebuilding of royal palaces in the Renaissance style probably began under James III and accelerated under James IV. These works have been seen as directly reflecting the influence of Renaissance styles. Linlithgow was first constructed under James I, under the direction of master of work John de Waltoun, and was referred to as a palace, apparently the first use of this term in the country, from 1429. This was extended under James III and began to correspond to a fashionable quadrangular, corner-towered Italian signorial palace of a palatium ad modem castri (a castle-style palace), combining classical symmetry with neo-chivalric imagery. There is evidence of Italian masons working for James IV, in whose reign Linlithgow was completed, and other palaces were rebuilt with Italianate proportions.

== Legacy ==
Scotland is known for its dramatically placed castles and towers, which have become an accepted part of a romantic landscape. Castles, tower houses, peel towers and royal palaces of the period all contributed to the development of the unique style known as the Scots baronial that would be used for estate houses in Scotland in the sixteenth century, and which would be revived and used extensively from the nineteenth century, including the royal residence at Balmoral and then exported across the world. The Reformation in the mid-sixteenth century would lead to the rejection of many features of Medieval churches, resulting in the widespread destruction of Medieval church furnishings, ornaments and decoration, and would usher in new architectural forms. However, they would be revived from the 1850s to the 1890s, when large Gothic revival churches were built in considerable numbers for all the major denominations.

== See also ==
- Architecture of Scotland
- Scotland in the Middle Ages
