= St Margaret's Chapel, Edinburgh =

St Margaret's Chapel
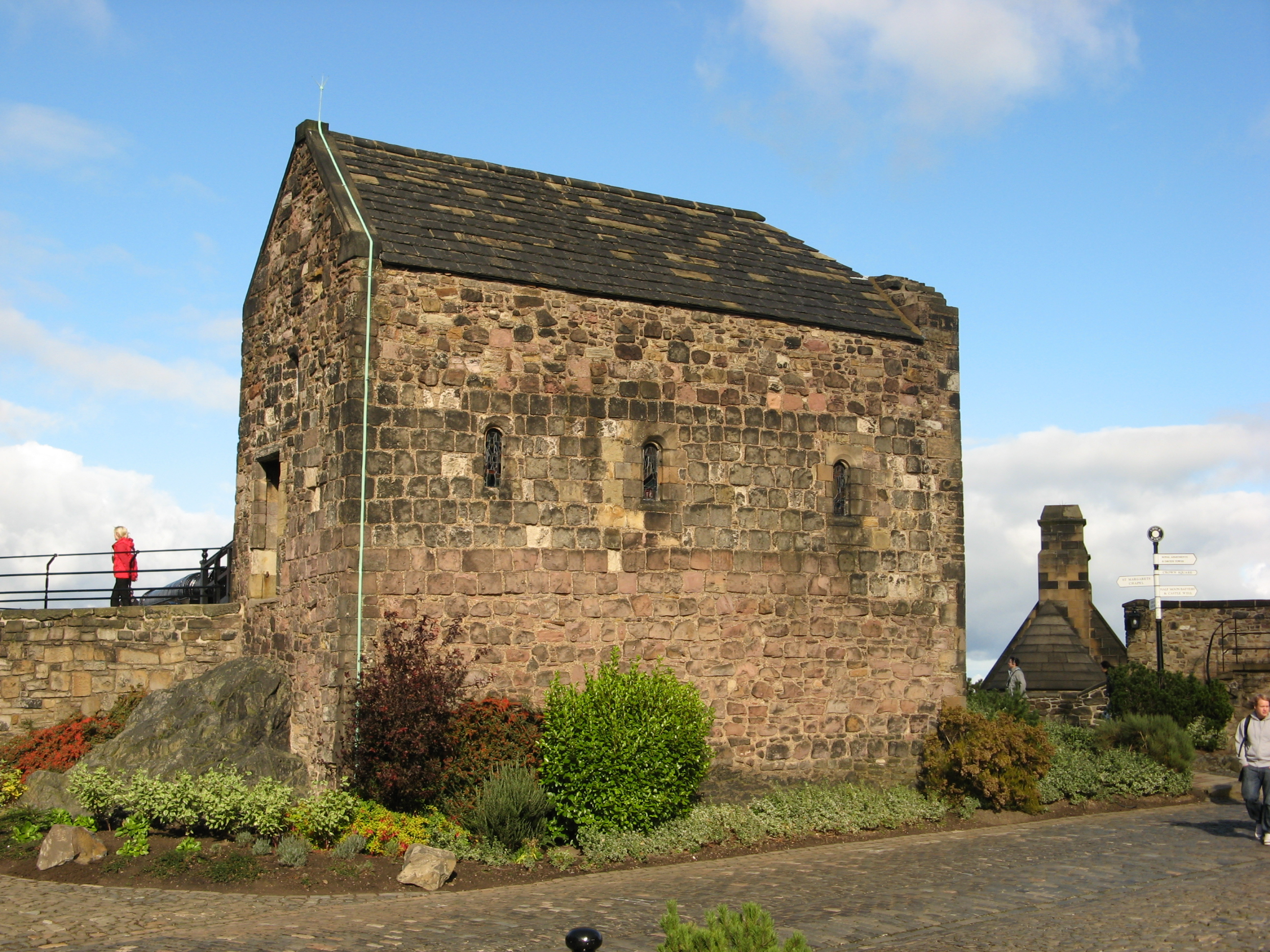
- The south façade of the chapel
- St Margaret's Chapel
- 55°56′55.4″N 03°12′00.4″W
- Location: Edinburgh Castle
- Country: Scotland
- Denomination: Non-denominational
- Previous denomination: Roman Catholic

History
- Founded: 12th century
- Founder: David I of Scotland
- Dedication: Saint Margaret of Scotland
- Dedicated: Rededicated on 16 November 1993

Architecture
- Heritage designation: Category A listed building
- Designated: 14 December 1970
- Style: Romanesque

Administration
- Parish: Canongate

St Margaret's Chapel, in Edinburgh Castle, is the oldest surviving building in Edinburgh, Scotland. An example of Romanesque architecture, it is a category A listed building. It was constructed in the 12th century, but fell into disuse after the Reformation. In the 19th century the chapel was restored and today is cared for by the St Margaret's Chapel Guild.

== History ==
Saint Margaret of Scotland (c. 1045 – 16 November 1093) was an English princess of the House of Wessex, the sister of Edgar Ætheling. Margaret and her family fled to Scotland following the Norman conquest of England of 1066. Around 1070 Margaret married Malcolm III of Scotland. She was a pious woman, and among many charitable works she established a ferry across the Firth of Forth for pilgrims travelling to Dunfermline Abbey. According to the Life of Saint Margaret, attributed to Turgot of Durham, she died at Edinburgh Castle in 1093, just days after receiving the news of her husband's death in battle. In 1250 she was canonised by Pope Innocent IV.

=== Founding of the chapel ===
It was originally thought that St Margaret herself worshipped in this small chapel, but the style of the architecture indicates that it was built during the reign of David I, her fourth son, who ruled from 1124–1153. The chapel formed part of a larger building, located to the north, which contained the castle's royal lodgings.

On the night of 14 March 1314 the castle was captured by Robert the Bruce. He destroyed all the buildings in the castle, except for the little chapel. On his death bed in 1329, Bruce spoke of the story of Queen Margaret and issued orders for the chapel's repair, with some forty pounds Scots being put aside for that purpose. For many years afterwards the building was known as the "Royal Chapel in the Castle". There is a fairly frequent record of services held in the chapel, though another and larger chapel was also in use within the castle.

=== Disuse and restoration ===
The chapel fell into disuse at the Protestant Reformation, and was used as a gunpowder store from the 16th century. By 1845 the chapel formed a store room at the western end of the 18th century garrison chapel, when the antiquarian Sir Daniel Wilson realised the significance of the chapel and publicised the building. The garrison chapel was demolished and St Margaret's Chapel restored in 1851–1852 with the support of Queen Victoria. The barrel-vault over the nave was added at this time, in keeping with the architectural style of the earlier fabric. The architect Hippolyte Blanc proposed an enlargement later in the 19th century, but this was rejected. The stained glass was installed in 1922. In 1929 further work was carried out to bring the chapel back into use, and the restored and refurnished chapel was dedicated on 16 March 1934.

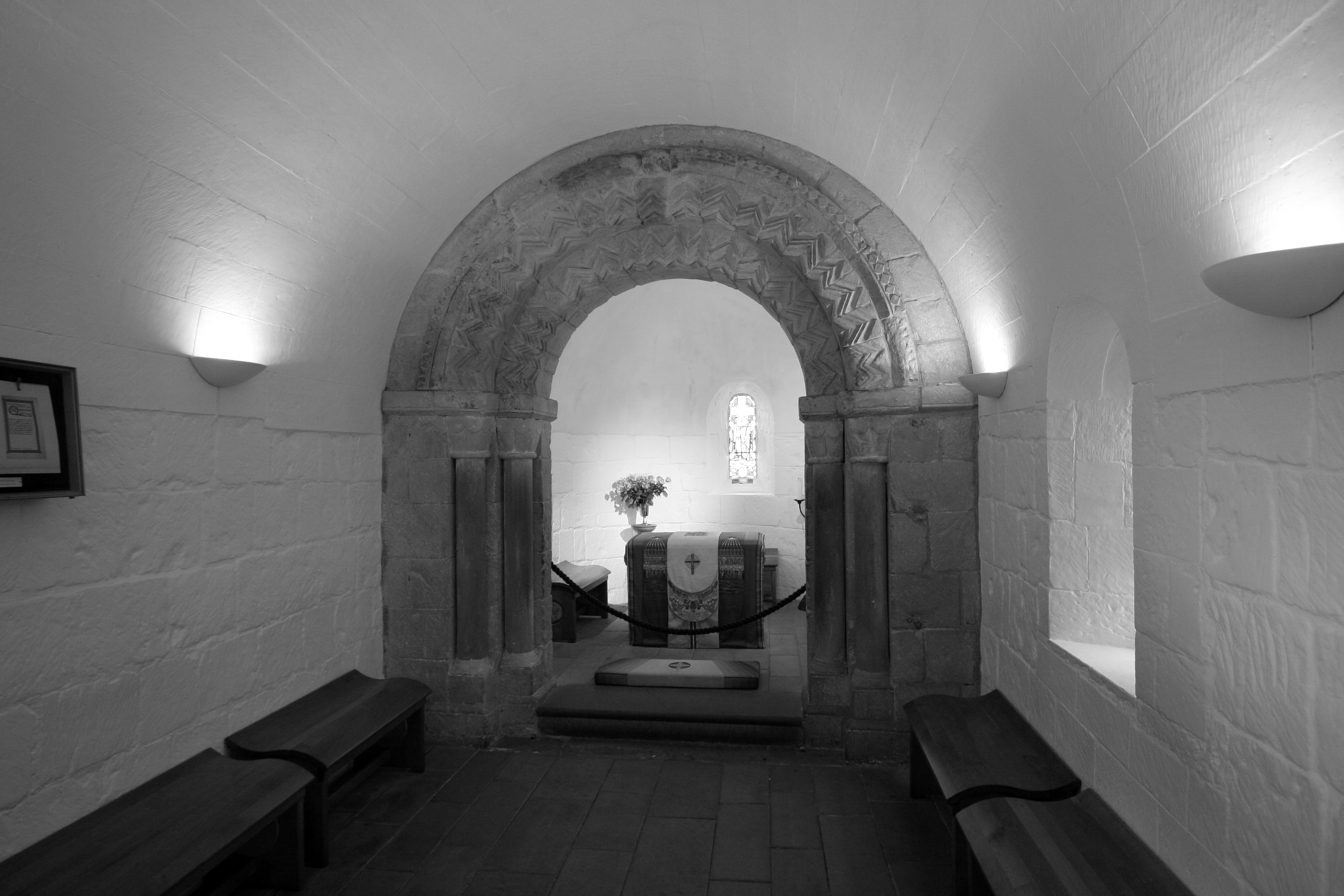
Interior of St Margaret's Chapel, showing the chancel arch with chevron motifs

=== St Margaret's Chapel Guild ===
The St Margaret's Chapel Guild was started in 1942 under the patronage of Princess Margaret and the leadership of Lady Russell. In 1993 as a commemoration of the 900th anniversary of the death of St Margaret, Historic Scotland renovated the chapel and St Margaret's Chapel Guild refurbished it with a new altar cloth, ten bench seats, an alms chest, a flower stand, and a display case for a facsimile of the St Margaret's Gospel book. Members of St Margaret's Chapel Guild now have a tradition of ensuring that there are always fresh flowers in the chapel to welcome visitors. Membership of the Guild is reserved only for those with the first or middle name Margaret, or a name derived from Margaret. Baptisms and weddings are held at the chapel.

== Architecture ==
The small irregular stone building has some similarity to earlier Scottish and Irish Celtic chapels. The rectangular structure with an internal width of 3 metres (10 ft) has an entrance door at one side near the back of the nave which is 4.87 m (16 ft) long, then a typically Romanesque round chancel arch 1.52 m (5 feet) wide with chevron mouldings decorating the arch above columns on each side leads into an apsed sanctuary 3 m long, with the apse having a radius of 1.52 m. The north wall has been renewed, and the three surviving outer walls are 61 cm (2 ft) thick, as is the chancel wall. Five small round-headed windows and the round arch above the entrance door confirm the Romanesque style.

The five stained-glass windows were made by Douglas Strachan in 1922, and illustrate St Margaret, St Andrew, St Columba, St Ninian and William Wallace.

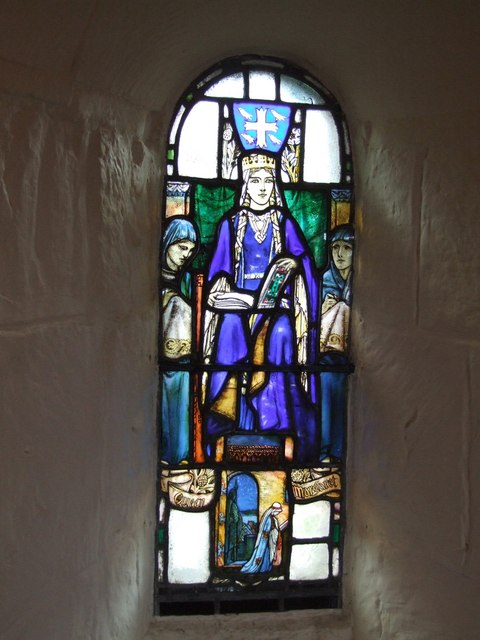
St Margaret of Scotland

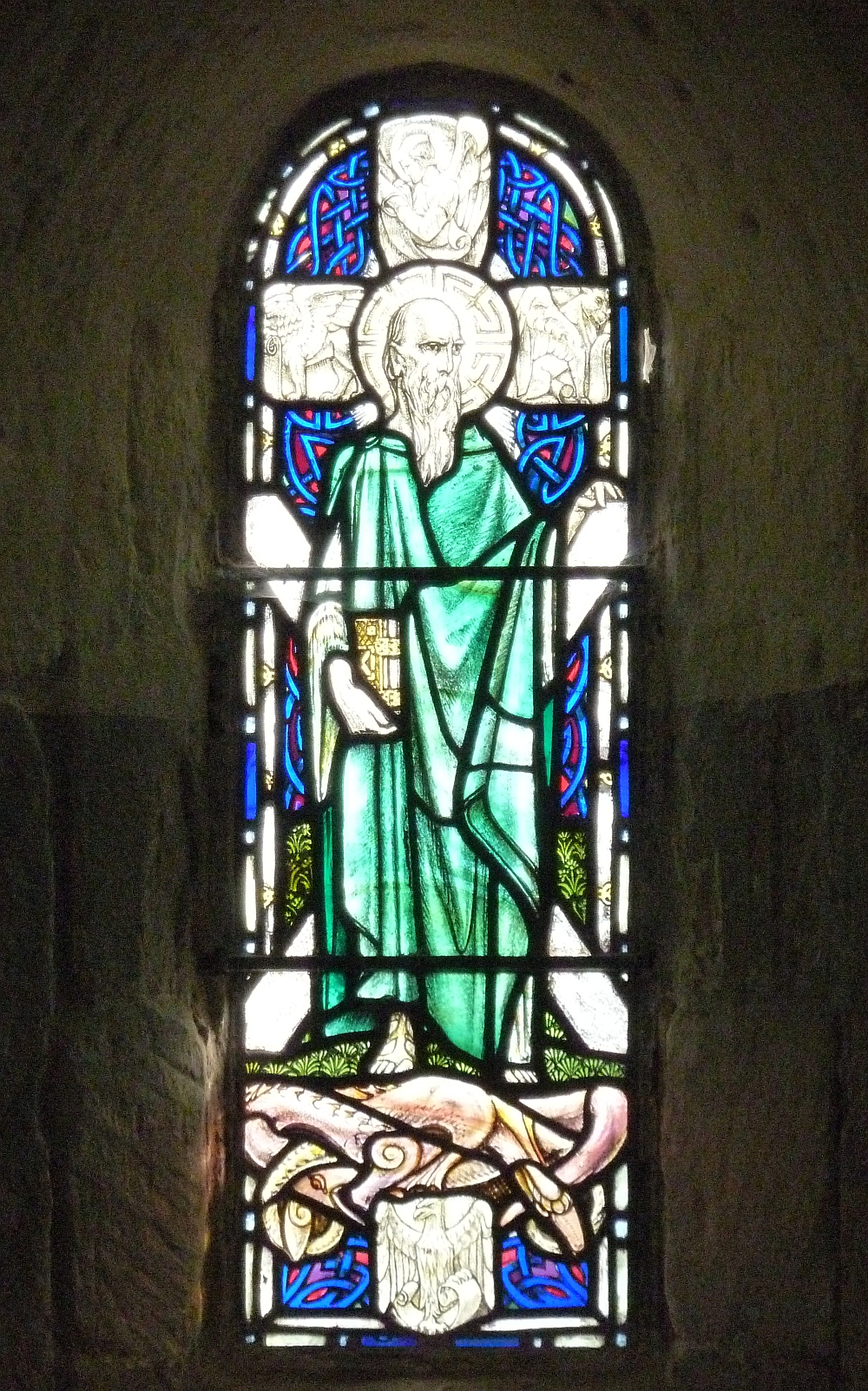
St Andrew

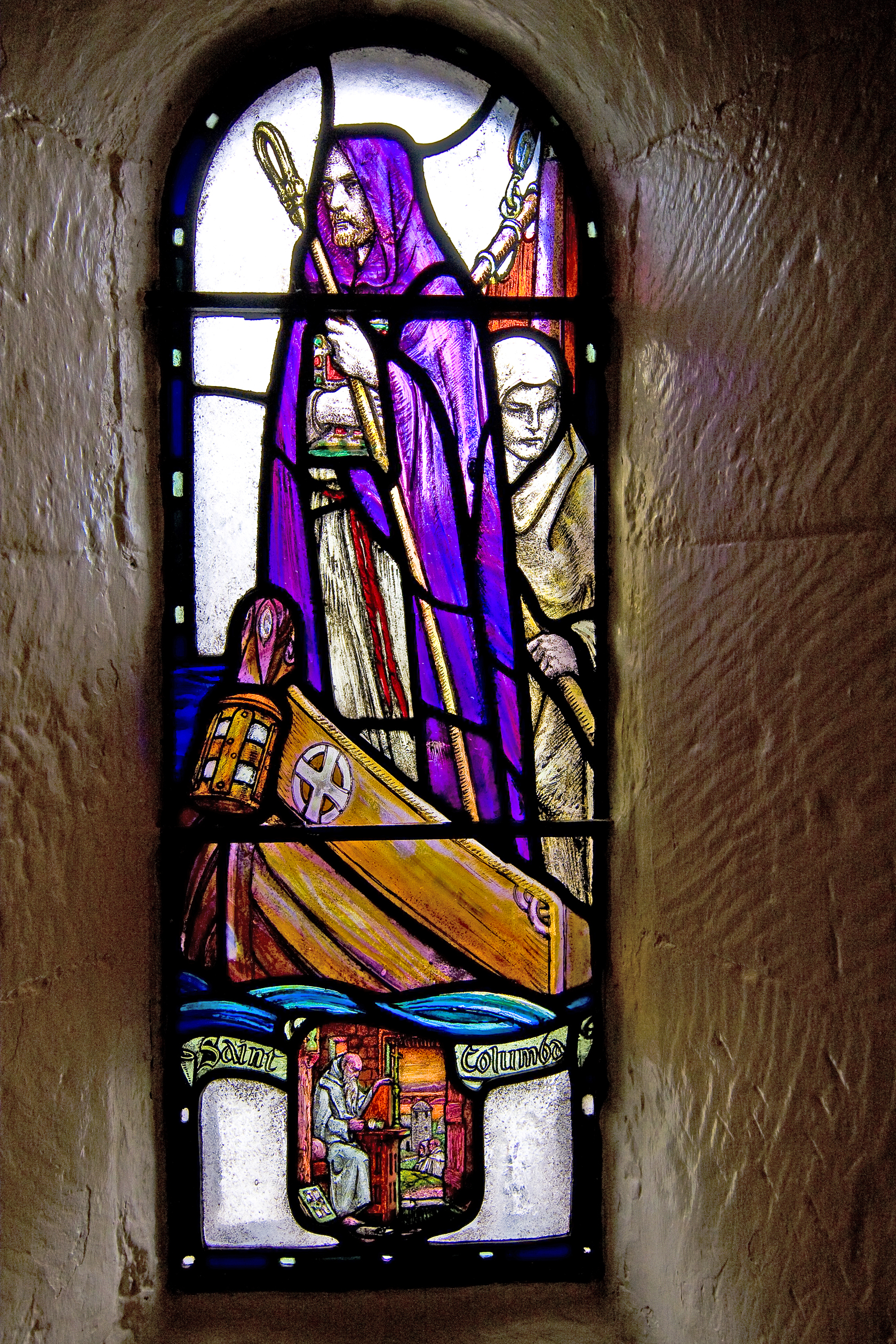
St Columba

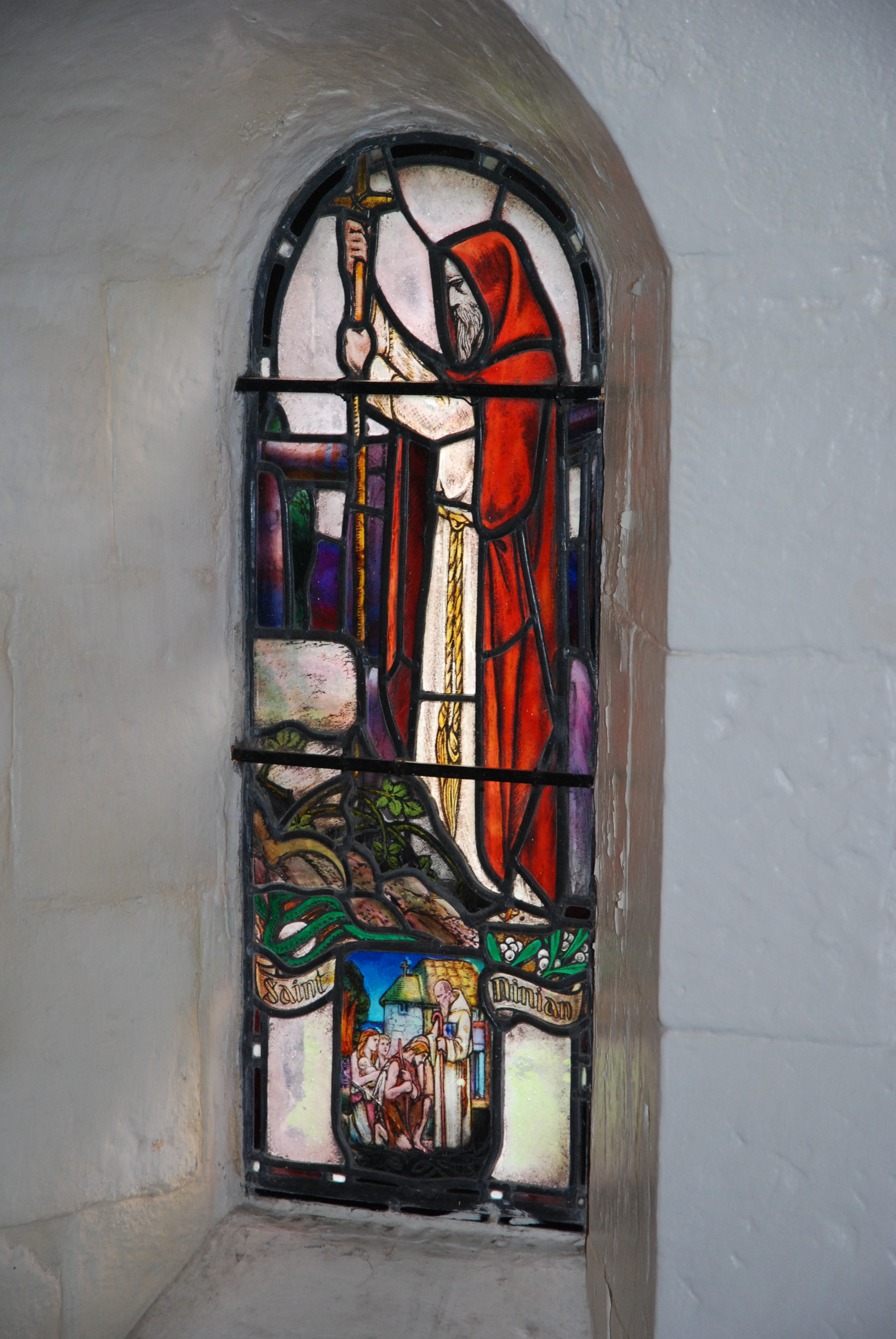
St Ninian

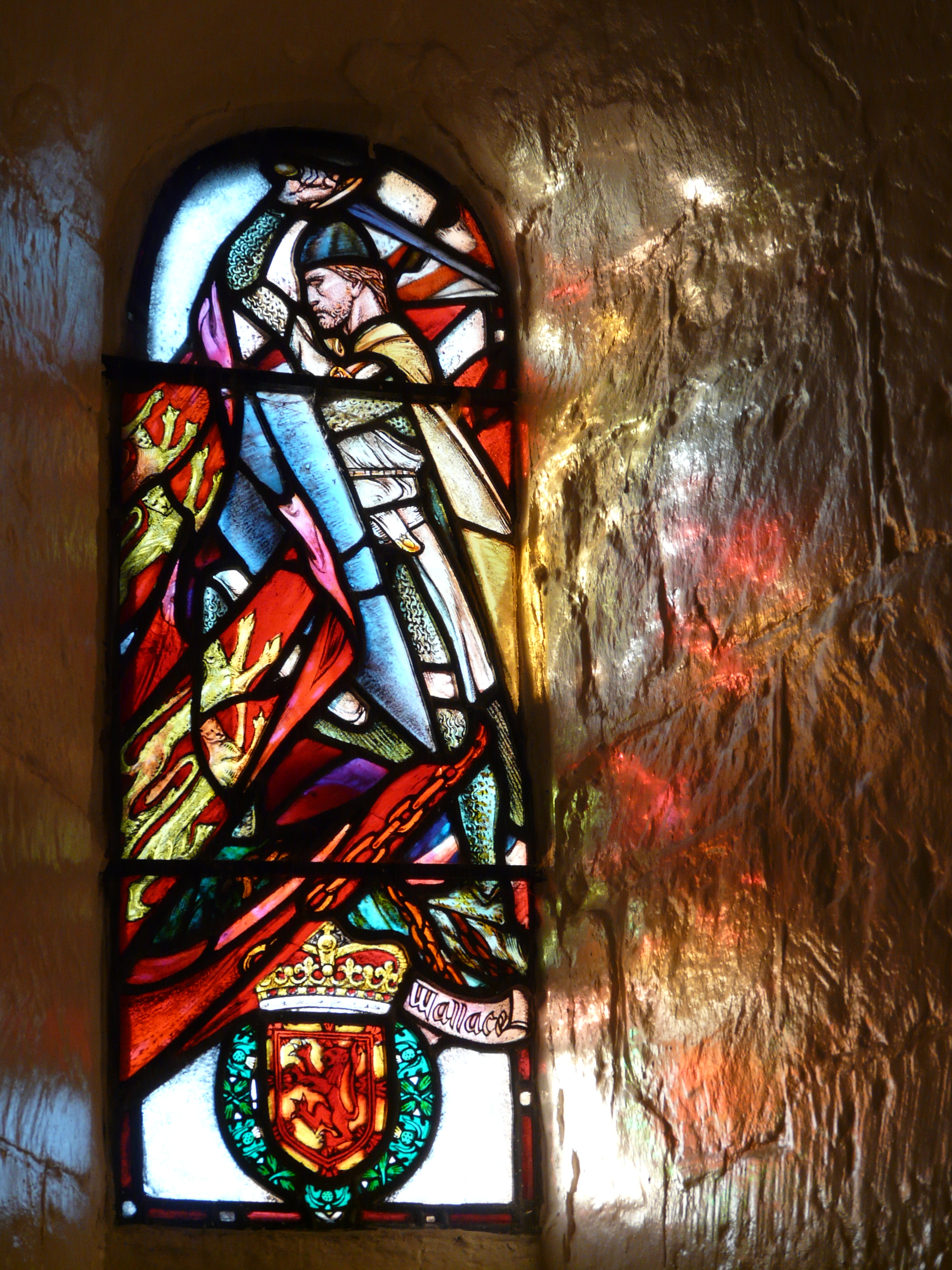
William Wallace
