= Dun Ardtreck =

D-shaped dun or "semi-broch" in Scotland

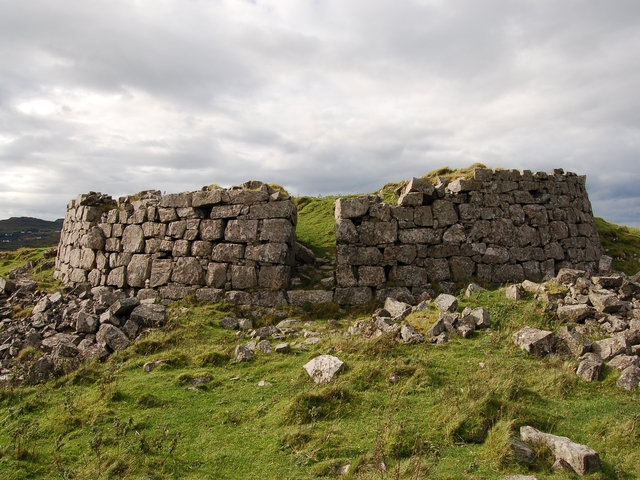
- Entrance to Dun Ardtreck

- Location within Isle of Skye
- 57°20′05″N 6°25′48″W
- Type: Broch
- Periods: Iron Age
- Location: Skye

Dun Ardtreck is a D-shaped dun, or "semi-broch", located on the west coast of the island of Skye, in Scotland (grid reference NG33503581).

== Location ==
Dun Ardtreck is located on the Minginish peninsula of Skye. It is near to the small village of Ardtreck, close to the villages of Portnalong & Fiskavaig. It is situated on a rocky knoll on the edge of a cliff overlooking the sea. The landward side of the knoll is bounded by precipitous rock faces except on the southeast where a small cleft was used for an outer gateway.

== Description ==
Dun Ardtreck is a D-shaped fortification (dun) of a type commonly regarded as a prototype broch or "semi-broch". It was built with the straight side of the fort facing the sheer cliffs. It encloses an area of about 13 by 10 metres. It was constructed with a rudimentary hollow-wall. The entrance is particularly well-preserved with door-checks characteristic of brochs. The entrance to a guard cell led off to the right behind the door-checks.

Surrounding the dun is an outer wall which runs along much of the edge of the knoll on the landward side.

== Excavations ==
Dun Ardtreck was excavated by Euan W. MacKie in 1964-5 as part of an exercise to establish the development of the broch. It had been built in two stages: a roughly level platform was constructed and on this was set the galleried wall. Charcoal from the platform was radiocarbon dated to 115 BC. The first phase of occupation seems to have been very short and it appears to have ended in violence and destruction. The second phase was dated from the pottery finds to the middle of the 2nd century AD. The finds from this period included iron tools, bronze ornaments and glass ring-heads as well as Roman Samian ware pottery sherds and a piece of a Roman bead.

Dun Ardtreck is a D-shaped structure with the straight side formed by the edge of a high cliff, along which a narrow wall ran. The thick, drystone wall, the design of the entrance passage, with its door-checks, and the intramural gallery suggests that the building once had the high, hollow wall of the broch towers but had suffered serious demolition at one stage. There are two doorways into the wall gallery, one of which is at a place where the gallery widens, as if to accommodate a stone stair, but no traces of this remain. The height of the wall at the cliff edge is about 6 inches but it rises to several feet at the entrance passage, which faces inland; the structure was built on the rock surface sloping inland from the cliff edge, a rubble platform forming the foundation.

The primary occupation of the dun was a relatively thin floor deposit inside, on which some burnt material lay, implying destruction by fire.
