= Knap of Howar =

Neolithic farmstead in northwest Scotland

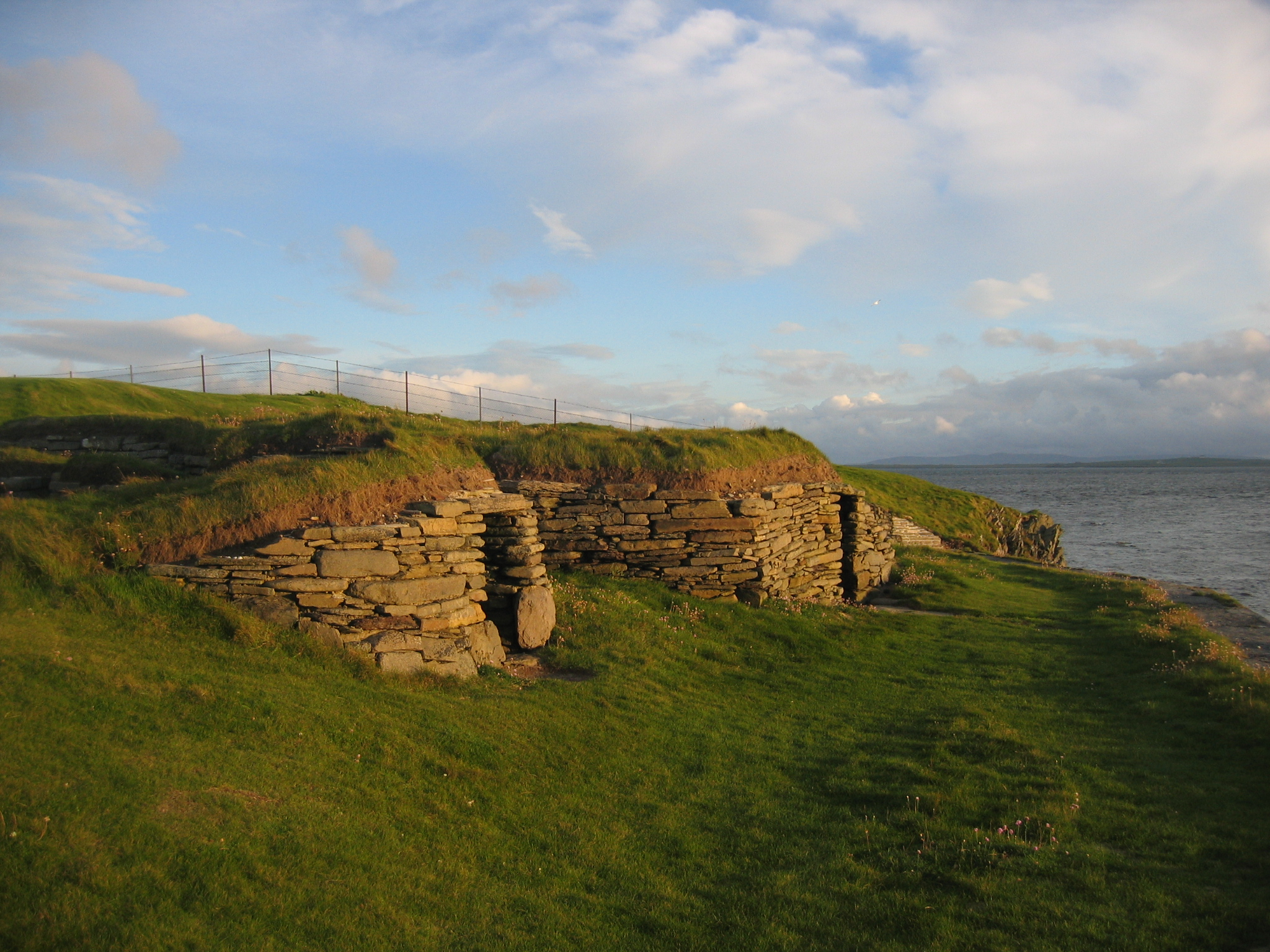
- The house in 2009

- Location in Scotland, United Kingdom

General information
- Location: Scotland
- Coordinates: 59°20′58″N 2°54′38″W
- Years built: c. 3800 BC

Height
- Height: 1.6 meters

Technical details
- Material: Stone

The Knap of Howar (/ˌnæp əv ˈhaʊər/) on the island of Papa Westray in Orkney, Scotland, is a Neolithic farmstead which may be the oldest preserved stone house in northern Europe. Radiocarbon dating shows that it was occupied from 3800 BC to 2800 BC, earlier than the similar houses in the settlement at Skara Brae on the Orkney Mainland.

== The site ==
The farmstead consists of two adjacent rounded rectangular thick-walled stone buildings with very low doorways facing the sea. The larger and older structure is linked by a low passageway to the other building, which has been interpreted as a workshop or a second house. They were constructed on an earlier midden, and were surrounded by midden material which has protected them. There are no windows; the structures were presumably lit by fire, with a hole in the roof to let out smoke. Though they now stand close to the shore, they would have originally lain inland.

The stone walls of the buildings are preserved; and while the roof is missing, it was likely made of wood and thatched or turfed. A hearth and a stone-built cupboard survive inside, and there may have been an external porch. Local stone splits into thin slabs, offering a ready source of construction material.

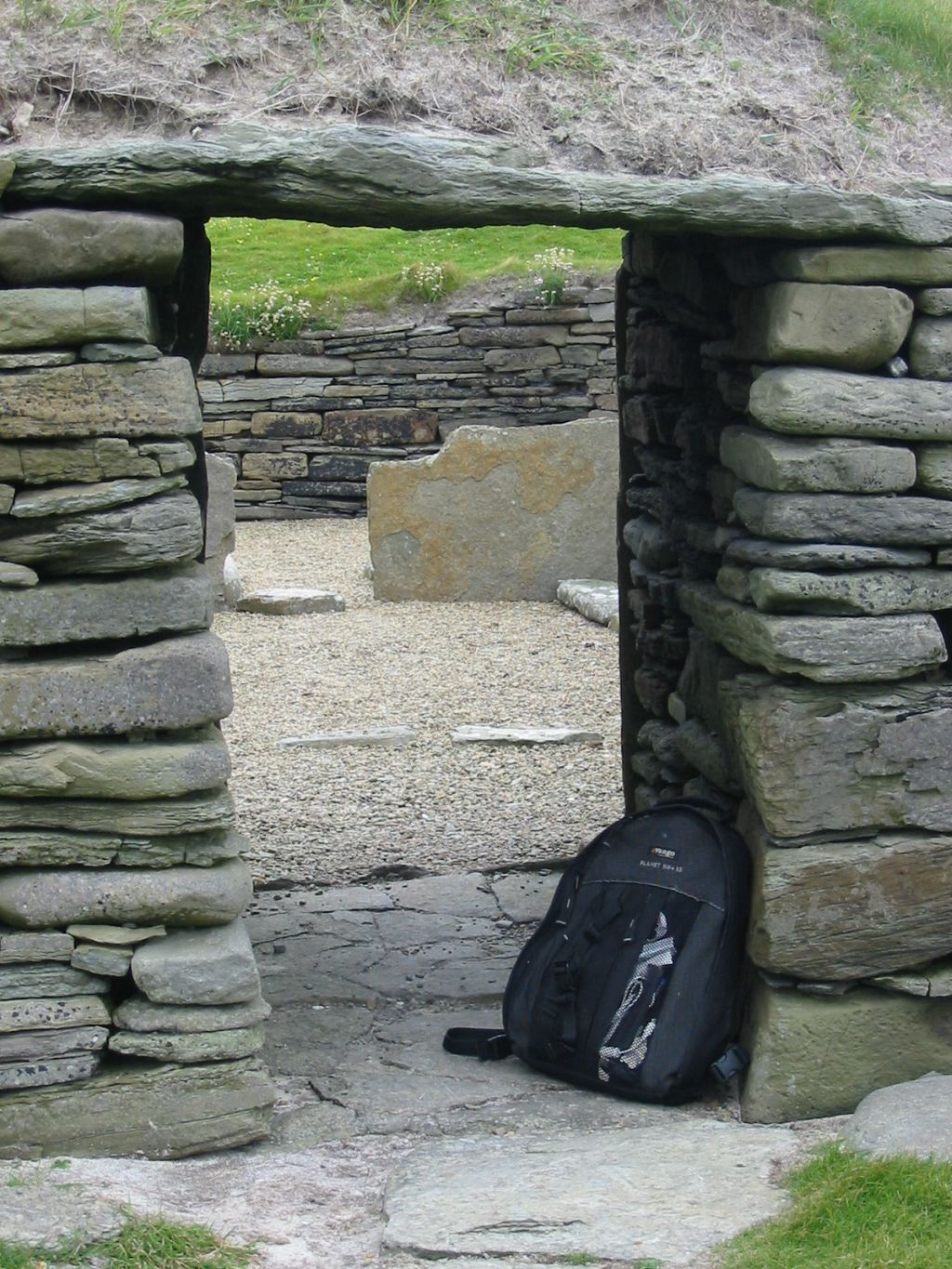
Looking back through the low entrance doorway into the main house, a visitor's backpack gives an idea of scale

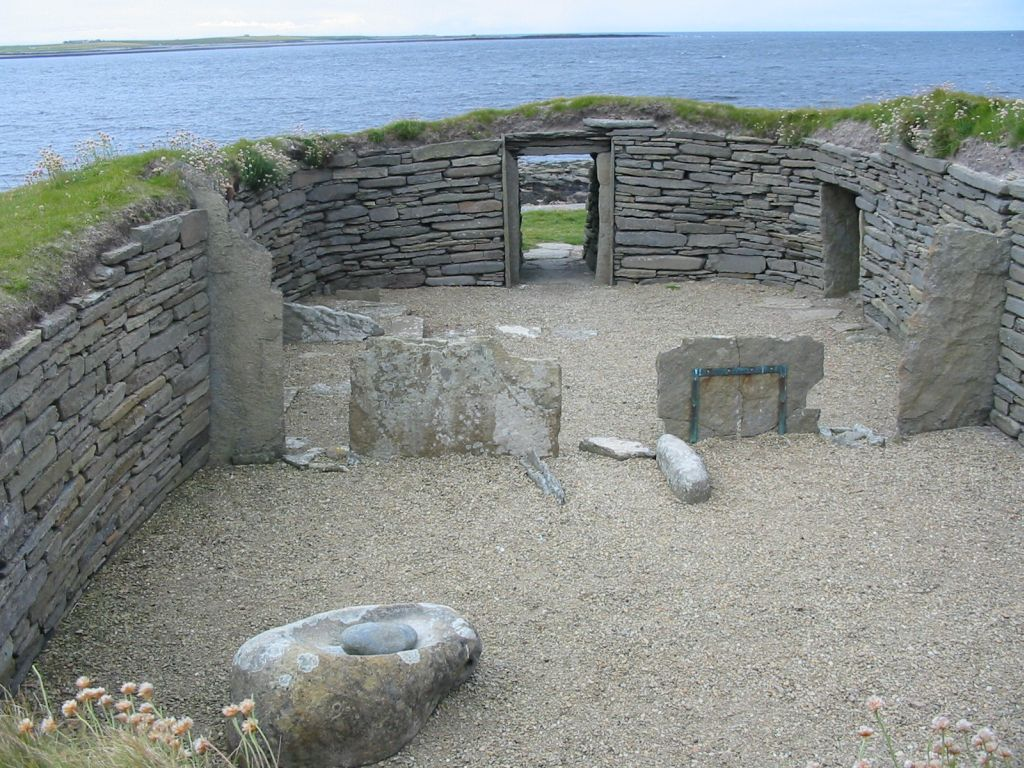
The main house now looks out over the Atlantic Ocean

The walls still stand to an eaves height of 1.6 metres (5 ft 3 in), and the stone furniture is intact, giving a vivid impression of life in the house. Fireplaces, partition screens, beds, and storage shelves are almost intact, and post holes were found indicating the roof structure.

Evidence from the middens shows that the inhabitants were keeping cattle, sheep and pigs, cultivating barley and wheat, and gathering shellfish as well as fishing for species which must have been line-caught using boats.

Finds of finely made and decorated Unstan ware pottery link the inhabitants to chambered cairn tombs nearby and to sites far afield including Balbridie and Eilean Domhnuill. The name Howar is believed to be derived from the Old Norse word haugr, meaning mounds or barrows. The site is in the care of Historic Scotland.

== See also ==
- Prehistoric Scotland § Farmers and monument builders
- Oldest buildings in Scotland
- List of the oldest buildings in the world

== Other sources ==
- Scotland Before History - Stuart Piggott, (Edinburgh University Press. 1982) ISBN 0-85224-348-0
- Scotland's Hidden History - Ian Armit, Tempus (in association with Historic Scotland. 1998) ISBN 0-7486-6067-4
- The Other Orkney Book - Gordon Thomson, (Northabout Publishing. 1980) ISBN 0-907200-00-1
- "The Knap of Howar and the Origins of Geometry" - by Nicholas Cope & Keith Critchlow (Kairos publications 2016). ISBN 9780992682330 - www.ncope.co.uk
