= Tappoch Broch =

Broch in Scotland

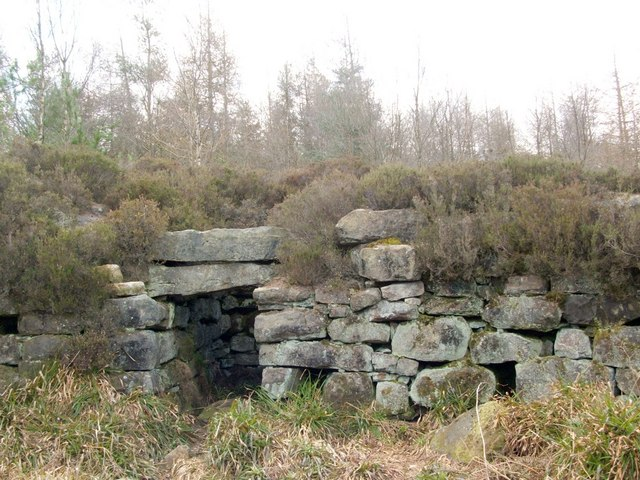
- Southern side of Tappoch Broch

- Location in Falkirk, Scotland
- 56°02′37″N 3°52′28″W
- Type: Broch
- Periods: Iron Age, Roman
- Location: Falkirk

Tappoch Broch, better known as Torwood Broch, is an iron-age broch located in a remote spot in dense woodland near Falkirk, Scotland.

== History ==
Tappoch broch was first excavated in 1864 by Colonel Joseph Dundas. Small-scale excavations have taken place near the site sporadically since. In 2014, a conservation project run by Archaeology Scotland and grant aided by Forestry Commission Scotland cleared the site of scrub vegetation. The broch was then surveyed by laser scanning undertaken by AOC Archaeology. This was combined by an key-hole excavation of the surrounding earlier hillfort by Dr Murray Cook. The results of which were published in the Proceedings of The Society of Antiquaries of Scotland and are available here.

== Description ==
The chamber of the broch, whose walls are about six metres thick, still reach a height of two or three metres, but in recent times whole wall sections have collapsed. The dry stonework is built of large, irregular stone blocks from the immediate vicinity. The oval chamber measures 10.8 to 9.8 metres, is paved and has a large fire spot in the middle. Access, with some of the fallen stones still in situ, is from the southeast. About halfway down the passage is a stop for a door with a latch for the door beam. In the south-west of the chamber a short aisle branches off to the right and leads to an unusually well-preserved staircase in the wall. In 1864 there were still eleven steps, some of which were later lost. The side walls of the stairs slope inwards, which indicates that it was originally designed as a cantilever vault. A small chamber in the north-east of the wall appears to be of modern origin.

The site has been designated a scheduled monument.

== Archaeological Finds ==
Unlike other Lowland Brochs such as Leckie Broch artefacts recovered from Tappoch were relatively sparse with no Roman material on site. Finds included saddle and rotary querns, a potential stone 'lamp' and several sherds of coarse pottery.

== Images ==
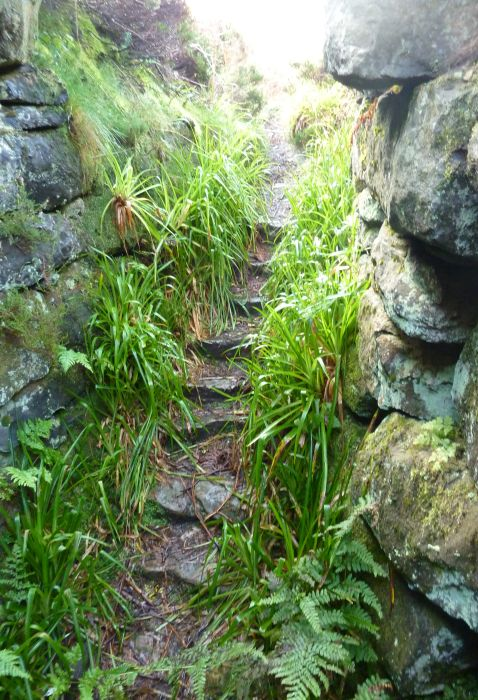
Tappoch Broch stairs

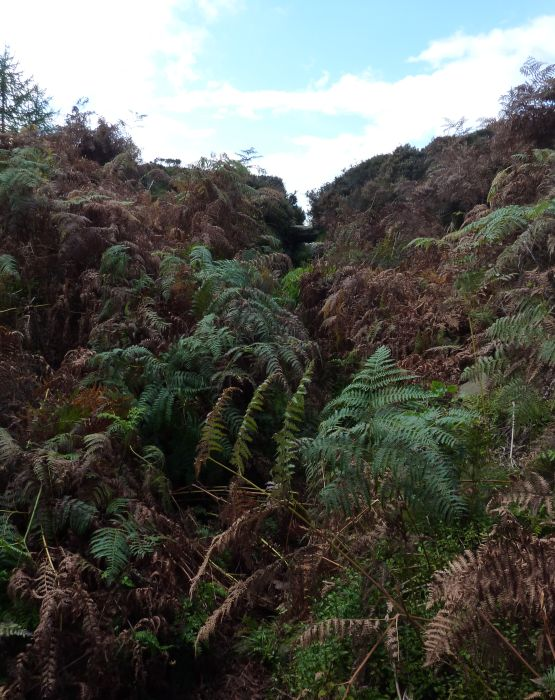
Tappoch Broch entrance

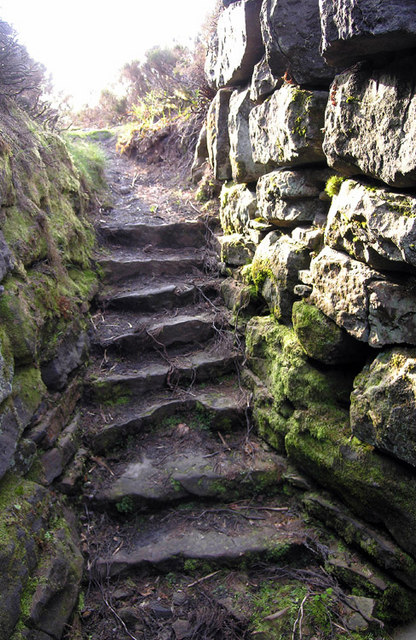
Tappoch Broch Stairwell

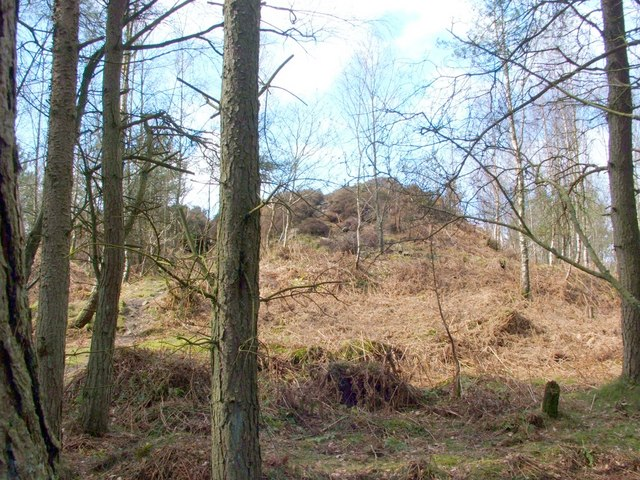
The approach to Tappoch Broch

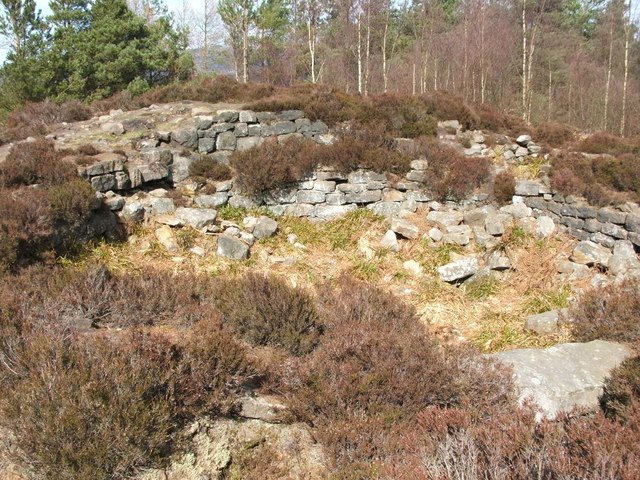
Tappoch Broch - northern side

== Ongoing Management and New Research ==
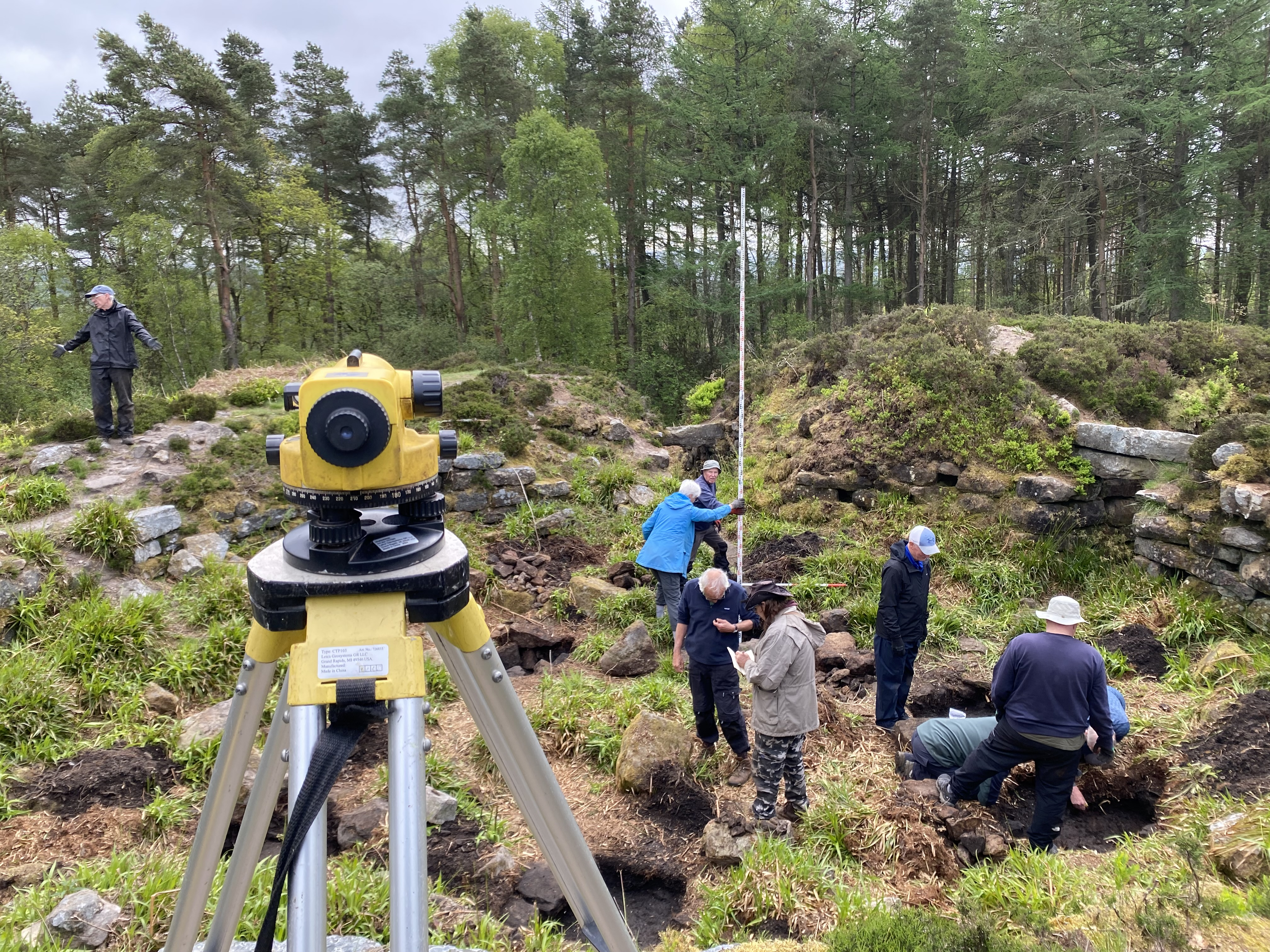
2025 Fieldwork

In 2024 and 2025, Dr Murray Cook and the Falkirk Council Ranger Service undertook bracken and self seeded tree clearance from the broch and hillfort. In 2025 this was combined with the first modern excavation within the interior of the broch, a brief account of the results is presented here. A further season in 2026 identified a previously unknown in situ floor and hearth.

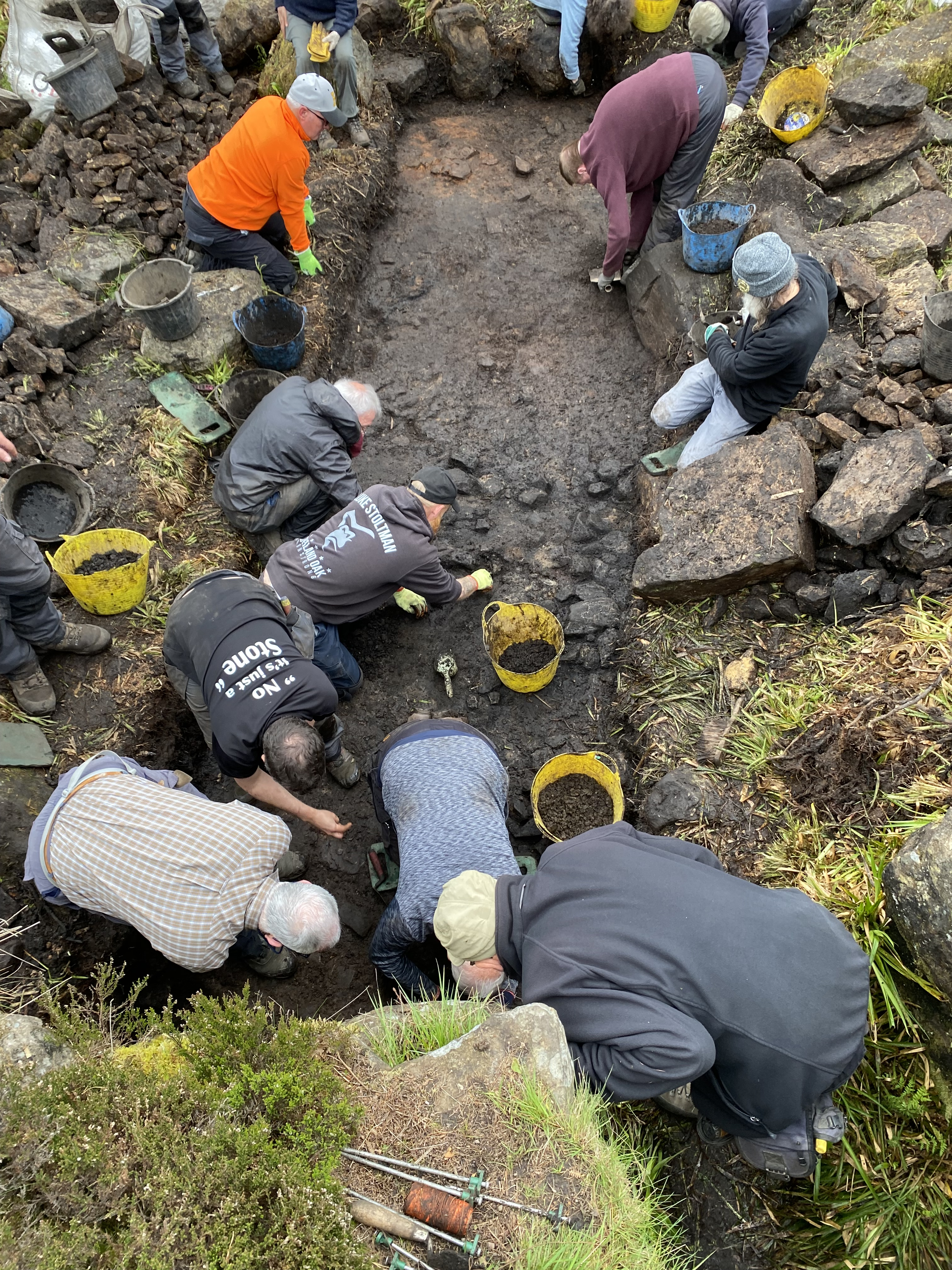
2026 Excavations by Dr Murray Cook at Tappoch Broch
