= Midhowe Broch =

Iron Age structure on Rousay, Orkney, Scotland

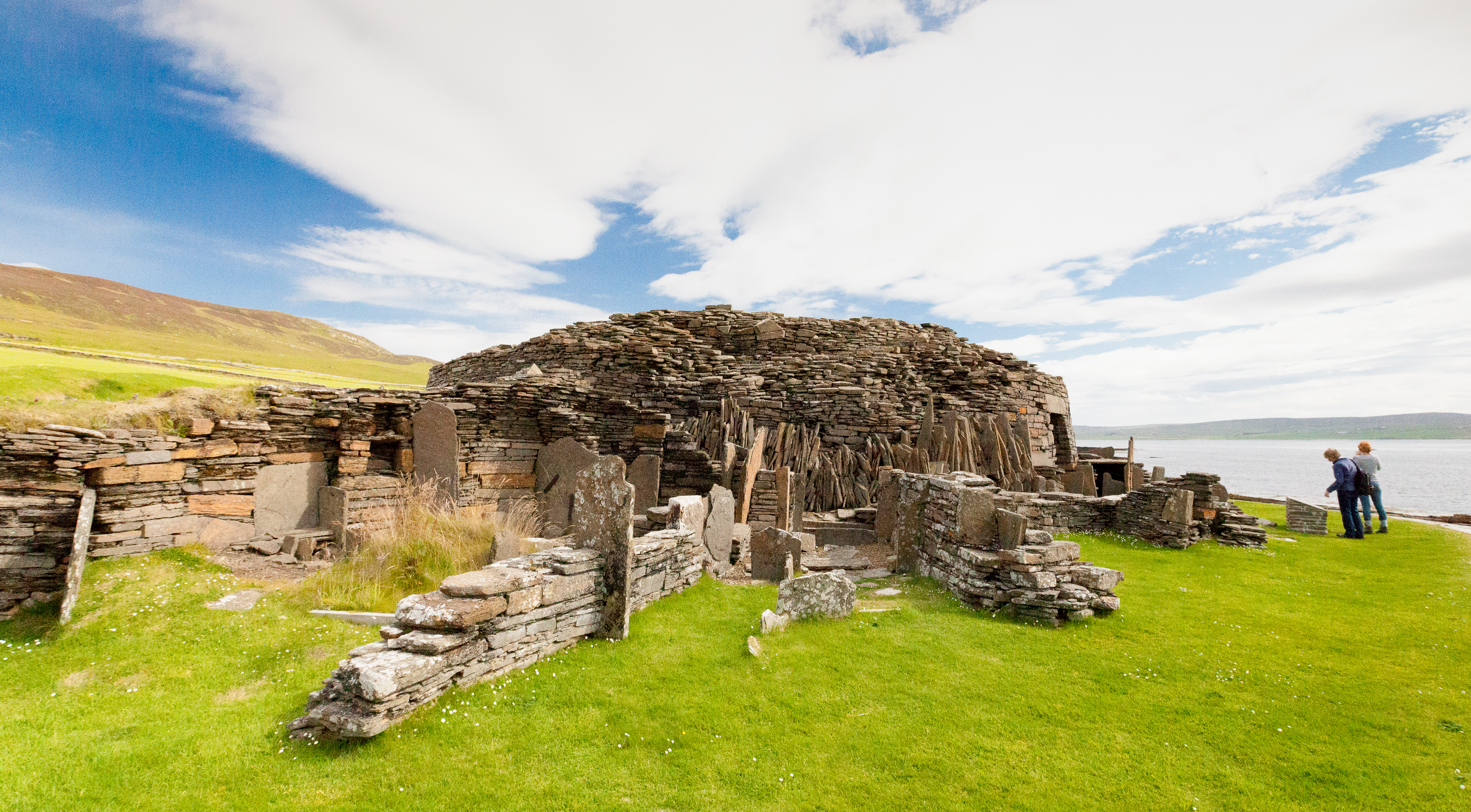
- Midhowe Broch

- Location within Orkney Islands
- 59°09′27″N 3°06′01″W
- Type: Broch
- Periods: Iron Age
- Location: Rousay

Site notes
- Owner: Historic Scotland
- Public access: Yes

Midhowe Broch (/ˈmɪdhaʊ brɒx/) is an Iron Age broch located on the west coast of the island of Rousay in the Orkney Islands, in Scotland.

== Description ==
Midhowe Broch (grid reference HY37163061) is situated on a narrow promontory between two steep-sided creeks, on the north side of Eynhallow Sound. The broch is part of an ancient settlement, part of which has been lost to coastal erosion. The broch got its name from the fact that it is the middle of three similar structures that lie grouped within 500 metres of each other and Howe from the Old Norse word haugr meaning mound or barrow.

The broch tower has an internal diameter of 9 metres within a wall 4.5 metres thick, which still stands to a height of over 4 metres. The broch interior is crowded with stone partitions, and there is a spring-fed water tank in the floor and a hearth with sockets which may have held a roasting spit.

The broch is surrounded by the remains of other lesser buildings, and a narrow entrance provides access into the defended settlement. The other buildings seem to have been built as adjacent houses, but later in the site's history they were used as workshops, and one of these buildings still retains its iron-smelting hearth.

A short distance to the southeast is a large Neolithic chambered cairn known as Midhowe Chambered Cairn.

== Excavations ==
The broch and attendant buildings were excavated between 1930 and 1933 and then taken under guardianship. The excavations recovered stone and bone tools associated with grain processing, spinning and weaving. Also found were pieces from crucibles and moulds associated with bronzeworking. Also discovered was a fragment from a Roman bronze vessel. Many of the artefacts are now on display at the Broch of Gurness.
