= Dun Beag =

Iron-age broch on the west coast of the island of Skye, Scotland

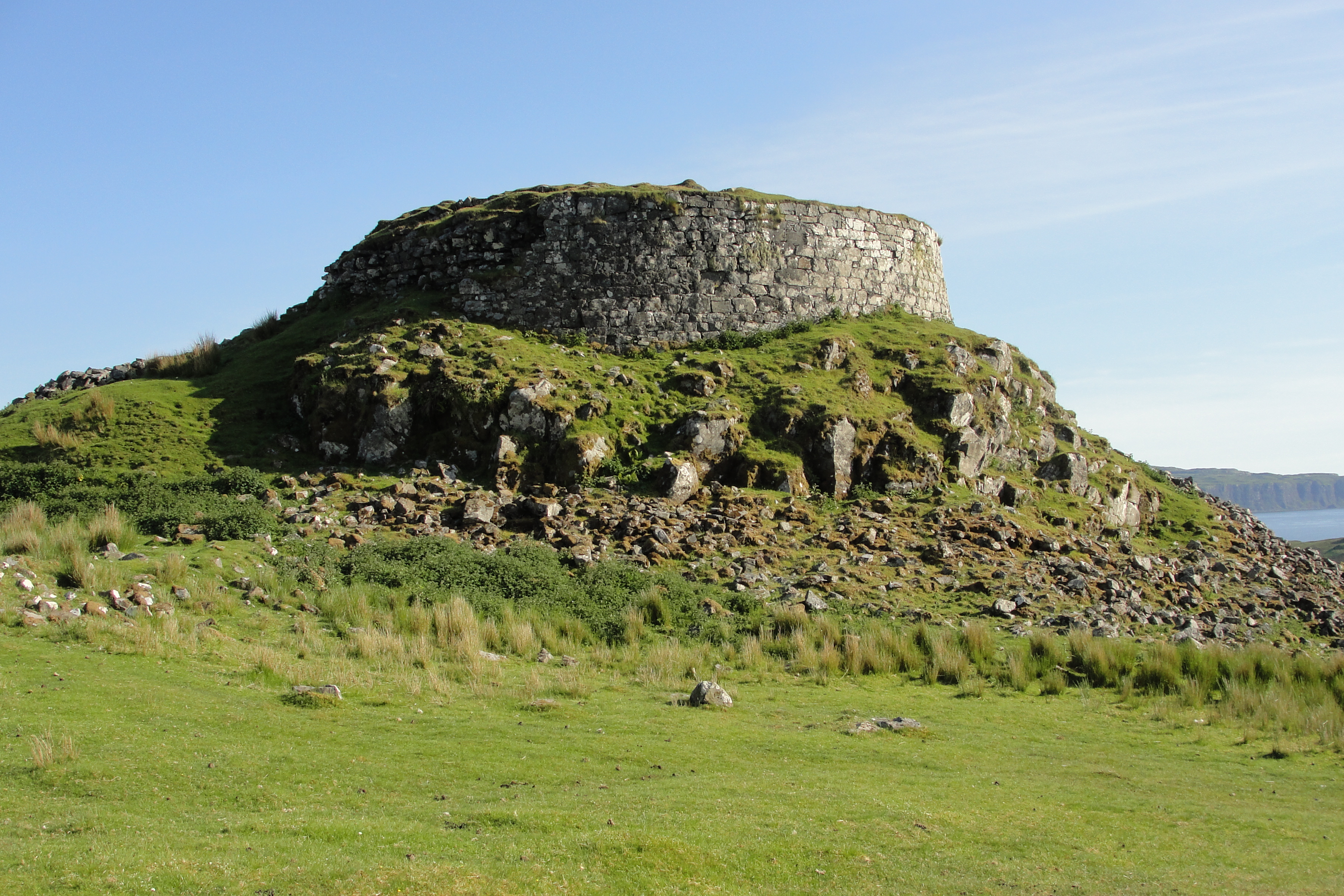
- Dun Beag

- Dun Beag shown within the Isle of Skye, Scotland
- 57°21′37″N 6°25′33″W
- Type: Broch
- Periods: Iron Age
- Location: Skye

Site notes
- Owner: Historic Environment Scotland
- Public access: Yes

Dun Beag is an iron-age broch located about 1 kilometre northwest of the village of Struan on the west coast of the island of Skye, in Scotland.

== Description ==
Dun Beag (grid reference NG339386) is situated at the north end of a small rocky knoll. The broch consists of a drystone tower with a diameter of around 18.6 metres with walls about 4 metres thick at the base. The broch currently stands to a maximum height of 2 metres.

The interior has a diameter of about 11 metres, and the entrance is on the east side. Internally three openings are visible in the broch wall. One leads to a small chamber; a second leads to a long narrow gallery within the wall; and a third leads to the stone stair of which some twenty steps survive.

== History ==
The broch was visited by Thomas Pennant in 1772, and it was still a substantial structure, with a height of perhaps 4 metres. The following year a broch near Ullinish, which was probably Dun Beag, was visited by Samuel Johnson and James Boswell during their Tour to the Hebrides. Around half of its wall height has been lost since the 18th century.

The broch was excavated by the Countess Vincent Baillet de Latour between 1914 and 1920. Some 200 tons of earth and stones were removed from the broch and all the soil was sifted through the excavators' fingers. The standard of recording and publication was poor. Finds included many stone implements and utensils, a gold ring, bronze objects, a piece of folded sheet lead, iron and glass objects, a borer of bone, a pick made from an antler, much pottery and a stone cup. Several hundred glass beads were found although they are not thought to be prehistoric. Coins of Henry II, Edward I, James VI, George II and George III have been discovered, and it is possible that the broch was in use until comparatively recently.
