= Interpret Scotland =

Interpret Scotland is an inter-agency initiative between Scottish organisations concerned with heritage interpretation. It was begun in 1997 and its key aims are to :

- Improve the quality and quantity of interpretation in Scotland
- Promote the co-ordination of interpretation at local and strategic level
- Share resources, expertise and experience to avoid duplicating effort

The Interpret Scotland journal, which is published twice a year, has been running since 2000 and includes articles on all facets of interpretation. Interpret Scotland can be credited with raising awareness of professional heritage interpretation within Scotland, particularly through inter-agency support and networking.

Together with the Association for Heritage Interpretation, Interpret Scotland established a steering group which planned and carried out The Vital Spark Interpretation Conference.

== List of members ==
The Interpret Scotland steering group has expanded over the years and currently consists of :-

- Association for Scottish Visitor Attractions
- Council for Scottish Archaeology
- Forestry Commission Scotland
- Highlands and Islands Enterprise
- Historic Scotland
- Museums Galleries Scotland
- National Archives of Scotland
- National Galleries of Scotland
- National Museums of Scotland
- The National Trust for Scotland
- Royal Botanic Gardens Edinburgh
- Royal Society for the Protection of Birds
- Scottish Enterprise
- Scottish Natural Heritage
- Scottish Tourist Guides Association
- Scottish Wildlife Trust
- VisitScotland
