= Scottish Development Department =

Scottish Development Department may refer to:

- Scottish Development Department, part of the former Scottish Office, pre-1999
- Scottish Executive Development Department, 1999 to 2007
