= Diana Murray =

Diana Murray CBE JP FRSE FRSGS FSA FSA Scot

Joint Chief Executive Officer, Historic Scotland
- In office 2013–2015

Secretary, Royal Commission on the Ancient and Historical Monuments of Scotland
- In office 2004–2015

Personal details
- Born: Diana Mary Collyer; 14 September 1952 (age 73)

Diana Mary Murray (née Collyer; born 14 September 1952) is an archaeologist who was secretary of the Royal Commission on the Ancient and Historical Monuments of Scotland (RCAHMS; 2004–2015) and latterly joint chief executive officer of Historic Scotland (2013–2015). Currently President of the Society of Antiquaries of Scotland and Chair of the Scottish Association for Marine Science, she has held a series of Trustee roles with different Scottish Institutions and was previously Chair of the Chartered Institute for Archaeologists (1995–1996).

== Education ==
Diana Murray studied for a master's degree in Archaeology and Anthropology at the University of Cambridge from 1971 to 1974.

== Career ==
She joined the Royal Commission on the Ancient and Historical Monuments of Scotland in 1976, and was Chair of the Chartered Institute for Archaeologists from 1995 to 1996, establishing the Register of Archaeological Organisations. In 2004 she was appointed as the Chief Executive of the Royal Commission on the Ancient and Historical Monuments of Scotland. She held this role until 2013 when RCAHMS merged with Historic Scotland and was subsequently appointed joint chief executive officer until 2015.

In 2016 she was elected as a Fellow of the Royal Society of Edinburgh and from 2016 until 2022 she was Chair of Arts and Business Scotland. She has chaired the Scottish Association for Marine Science since March 2019. In September 2023, she was appointed to the Scottish Committee of the National Lottery Heritage Fund. In November 2023 Diana Murray was elected president of the Society of Antiquaries of Scotland, having been a Fellow since 1977 and an Honorary Fellow since 2018.

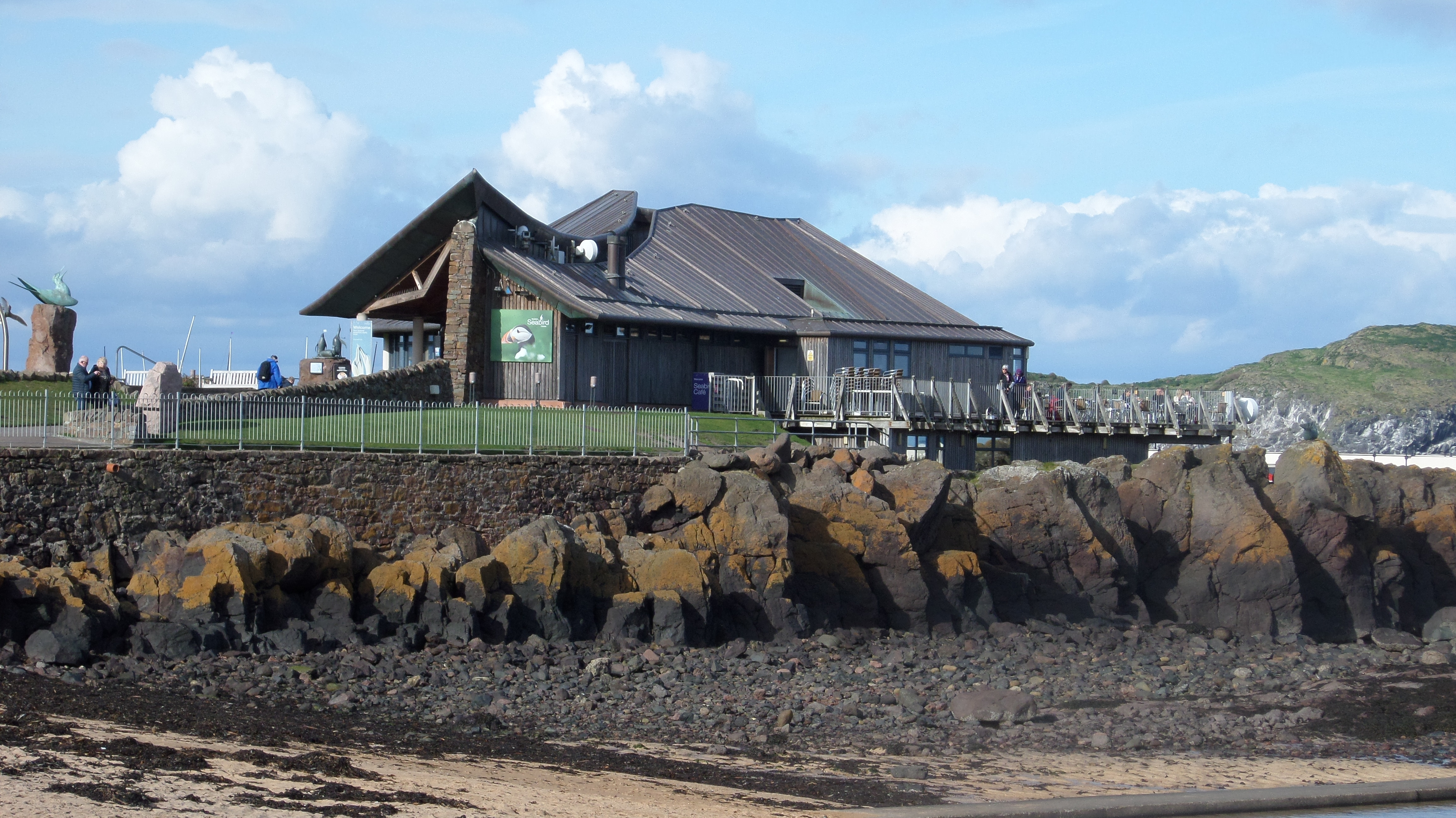
Scottish Seabird Centre

In 2017 she was presented with the Career Achievement Award by the Association of Geographic Information. In 2019, she was awarded a CBE for services to the cultural and historic environment in Scotland. Diana Murray has served as a non-executive director of the National Trust for Scotland (2008 to 2014), a trustee of the Scottish Waterways Trust (2012 to 2018), a Trustee at The Royal Botanic Garden Edinburgh (2013 to 2021), the Scottish Seabird Centre (2013 to 2022), and the Scottish International Education Trust since 2015. She is a Fellow of the Society of Antiquaries of London, a Fellow of the Royal Geographic Association of Scotland (since 2016), and was an Honorary Fellow of the School of History, Classics and Archaeology at the University of Edinburgh.

== Published works ==
- The excavation of a square-ditched barrow and other cropmarks at Boysack Mills, Inverkeilor, Angus, 1998
- National Inventories: from catalogues to computers, 2004
- A nation's history online, 2009
- The Royal Commission on the Ancient and Historical Monuments of Scotland - a record for the future, 2010
