= Gordon Stirling Maxwell =

Scottish archaeologist

Gordon S. Maxwell
- Born: 21 March 1938
- Died: 19 November 2024 (aged 86)
- Occupation: Archaeologist

Academic background
- Education: University of St Andrews

Academic work
- Discipline: Archaeology
- Institutions: RCAHMS

Gordon S. Maxwell (21 March 1938 – 19 November 2024) was a Scottish archaeologist. He made a significant contribution to the study of Roman Scotland and was a 'pioneer in the development of aerial reconnaissance in archaeology'.

== Early life and education ==
Gordon Stirling Maxwell was born on 21 March 1938, the son of Alina (nee Smith) and Edward Maxwell. He won a place to study at Daniel Stewart's College (now Stewart's Melville College) from where he went to the University of St Andrews to study classics.

== Career ==
After graduation, Maxwell taught Classics at Madras College in St Andrews before being appointed as an archaeological investigator at the Royal Commission on the Ancient and Historical Monuments of Scotland (RCAHMS) in 1964.

At RCAHMS, Maxwell contributed to all seven volumes of the Survey of Argyll as well as a volume on the Prehistoric and Roman Monuments of Lanarkshire. He also edited two landscape survey volumes on Perthshire.

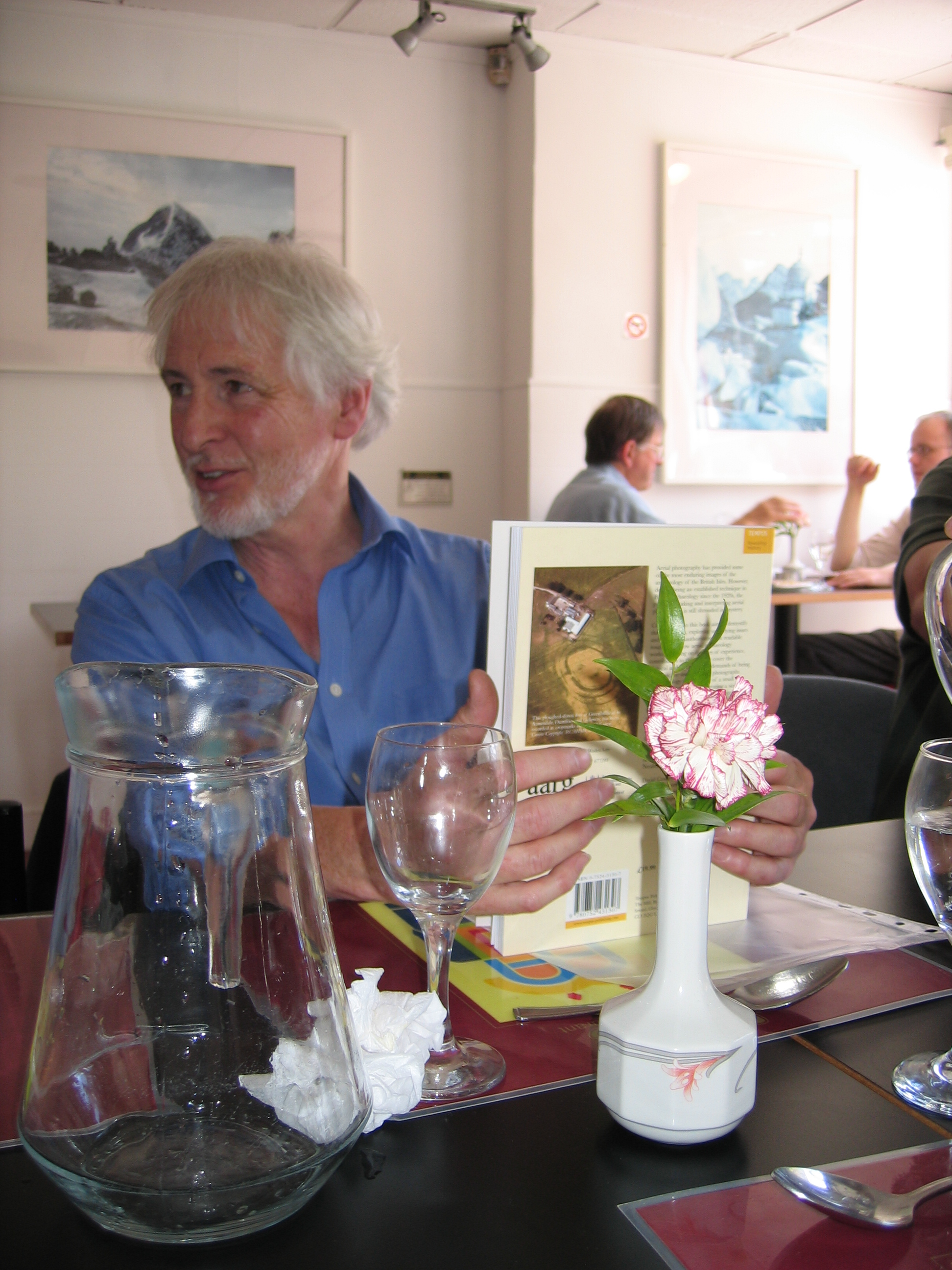
Photograph of Gordon Maxwell seated in a restaurant holding a copy of the 'From the Air' book which was dedicated to him

Maxwell established the aerial survey programme at RCAHMS from 1976. In this work, he was able to make a number of significant discoveries of new sites from the air, some of which he subsequently excavated, including the Roman fort of Doune in Stirlingshire. He discovered over a dozen Roman forts and fortlets, leading to a cartoon in The Times. A volume of papers on aerial survey in Scotland was dedicated to him in 2005.

Maxwell's primary research interests concerned the Roman army in Scotland, about which he published numerous papers in journals including the Proceedings of the Society of Antiquaries of Scotland, Glasgow Archaeological Journal and Britannia. He co-authored the standard text on the Antonine Wall as well as an overview of the Romans in Scotland and a volume on the search for the Battle of Mons Graupius. He was on the organising committee for the 12th International Congress of Roman Frontier Studies which took place in Stirling in 1979.

Maxwell was editor of the Proceedings of the Society of Antiquaries of Scotland from 1965–69 and was elected President of the Society from 1993-1996. He was elected as a Fellow of the Royal Society of Edinburgh in 1998 and was appointed an Honorary Professor at the University of St Andrews.

Maxwell retired from RCAHMS in 1995 where he and his wife Kathleen continued to look after their garden at their home in Fife, which was regularly opened to the public through Scotland's Gardens Scheme and once featured on BBC Scotland's The Beechgrove Garden.

Maxwell died in Fife on 19 November 2024.

== Selected publications ==
Maxwell, G S (1969) ‘Duns and forts: a note on some Iron Age monuments of the Atlantic province’, Scottish Archaeological Forum 1: 41–52.

Maxwell, G S (1969) ‘Excavations at Drumcarrow, Fife: an Iron Age unenclosed settlement’, Proc Soc Antiq Scot 100, 1967–8 (1969): 100–8. doi:10.9750/PSAS.100.108

Maxwell, G S (1974) ‘Excavations at the Roman fort of Crawford, Lanarkshire’, Proc Soc Antiq Scot 104, 1971–2 (1974): 147–200. doi:10.9750/PSAS.104.147.200

Maxwell, G S (1975) ‘Excavation at the Roman fort of Bothwellhaugh, Lanarkshire 1967–8’, Britannia 6: 20–35.

Maxwell, G S (1980) ‘Agricola’s campaigns: the evidence of the temporary camps’, Scottish Archaeological Forum 12: 25–54.

Hanson, W S & Maxwell, G S (1980) ‘An Agricolan Praesidium on the Forth–Clyde isthmus (Mollins, Strathclyde)’, Britannia 11: 43–9.

Maxwell, G S (ed) (1983) The Impact of Aerial Reconnaissance on Archaeology. London: CBA Research Report No. 49. ISBN 978-0-906780-24-4

Hanson, W S & Maxwell, G S (1983/1986) Rome’s North West Frontier: The Antonine Wall. Edinburgh: Edinburgh University Press. ISBN 978-0-85224-525-5

Maxwell, G S & Wilson, D R (1987) ‘Air reconnaissance in Roman Britain 1977–84’, Britannia 18: 1–48.

Maxwell, G S (1989) The Romans in Scotland. Edinburgh: James Thin. ISBN 978-0-901824-76-9

Maxwell, G S (1990) A Battle Lost: Romans and Caledonians at Mons Graupius. Edinburgh: Edinburgh University Press. ISBN 978-0-85224-615-3

Maxwell, G S (1998) A Gathering of Eagles: Scenes from Roman Scotland. Edinburgh: Canongate Books/Historic Scotland. ISBN 978-1-84158-384-6

Barclay, G J & Maxwell, G S (1998) The Cleaven Dyke and Littleour: Monuments in the Neolithic of Tayside. Edinburgh: Society of Antiquaries of Scotland Monograph 13. ISBN 978-0-903903-13-4
