= National Collection of Aerial Photography =

Archive in Edinburgh, Scotland

Coordinates: 55°55′25″N 3°17′56″W

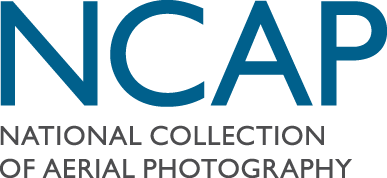
NCAP logo

The National Collection of Aerial Photography is a photographic archive in Edinburgh, Scotland, containing over 30 million aerial photographs of worldwide historic events and places. From 2008–2015 it was part of the Royal Commission on the Ancient and Historical Monuments of Scotland and since then it has been a sub-brand of Historic Environment Scotland. Many of the aerial reconnaissance photographs were taken during the Second World War and the Cold War, and were declassified and released by the Ministry of Defence. The collection also contains over 1.8 million aerial survey photographs of Scotland, during and in the years after the Second World War, as well as post-war Ordnance Survey, over 4 million photogrammetric images, and over 10 million aerial survey images of international sites as part of The Aerial Reconnaissance Archives (TARA). The collection contains both military declassified and non-military aerial photographs from over a dozen different national and international organisations.

NCAP’s historical aerial photography is primarily used to locate unexploded Second World War bombs by European bomb disposal companies and in historical, archaeological and climate change research. It is also used for documentaries and dramas on television and in film.

== Collections ==
- AIRBUS Defence & Space
- Allied Central Interpretation Unit (ACIU) (from RAF Medmenham)
- Defence Geographic Centre
- Directorate of Overseas Surveys (DOS)
- Environment Agency
- German Air Force
- Getmapping
- Joint Air Reconnaissance Intelligence Centre (JARIC)
- Mediterranean Allied Photo Reconnaissance Wing (MAPRW)
- National Archives and Records Administration
- Natural Environment Research Council
- Scottish Office Air Photographs Unit

=== Bibliography ===
- Cowley, Dave C, Crawford, James (2009). Above Scotland: The National Collection of Aerial Photography. RCAHMS. ISBN 978-1902419626
- Bailey, Rebecca M, Crawford, James, Williams, Allan (2010). Above Scotland Cities: The National Collection of Aerial Photography. RCAHMS. ISBN 978-1-902419-65-7
- Crawford, James (2012). Scotland's Landscapes: The National Collection of Aerial Photography. RCAHMS. ISBN 978-1902419824
- Hanson, William S., Oltean, Ioana A. editors (2012). Archaeology from Historical Aerial and Satellite Archives, Springer Science & Business Media. ISBN 978-1461445050
- Williams, Allan (2013). Operation Crossbow: The Untold Story of Photographic Intelligence and the Search For Hitler's V Weapons. Random House. ISBN 978-1848093072
