= National Monuments Record of Scotland =

The National Monuments Record of Scotland (NMRS) was the term used for the archive of the sites, monuments and buildings of Scotland's past maintained by the Royal Commission on the Ancient and Historical Monuments of Scotland. The commission was originally established by Royal Warrant in the reign of George VI "to make an inventory of the Ancient and Historical Monuments and Constructions connected with or illustrative of the contemporary culture, civilization and conditions of life of the people in Scotland from the earliest times to the year 1707, and to specify those which seem most worthy of preservation."

The separate name for the archive is no longer given prominence in RCAHMS corporate publications, and the term National Record of the Historic Environment is preferred. The NMRS was created when the Scottish National Buildings Record (itself founded in 1942) was transferred to the RCAHMS in 1966.

There are 240,000 archaeological sites, monuments and buildings recorded in CANMORE, the NMRS database. The NMRS also holds a collection of photographs, drawings and manuscripts.

== See also ==
- Architecture of Scotland
