= Archaeology Scotland =

- Formation: 1944
- Legal status: Charity
- Headquarters: Newbattle Abbey, Midlothian
- Website: https://www.archaeologyscotland.org.uk/
- Formerly called: Scottish Council For Archaeology (1988–2008)

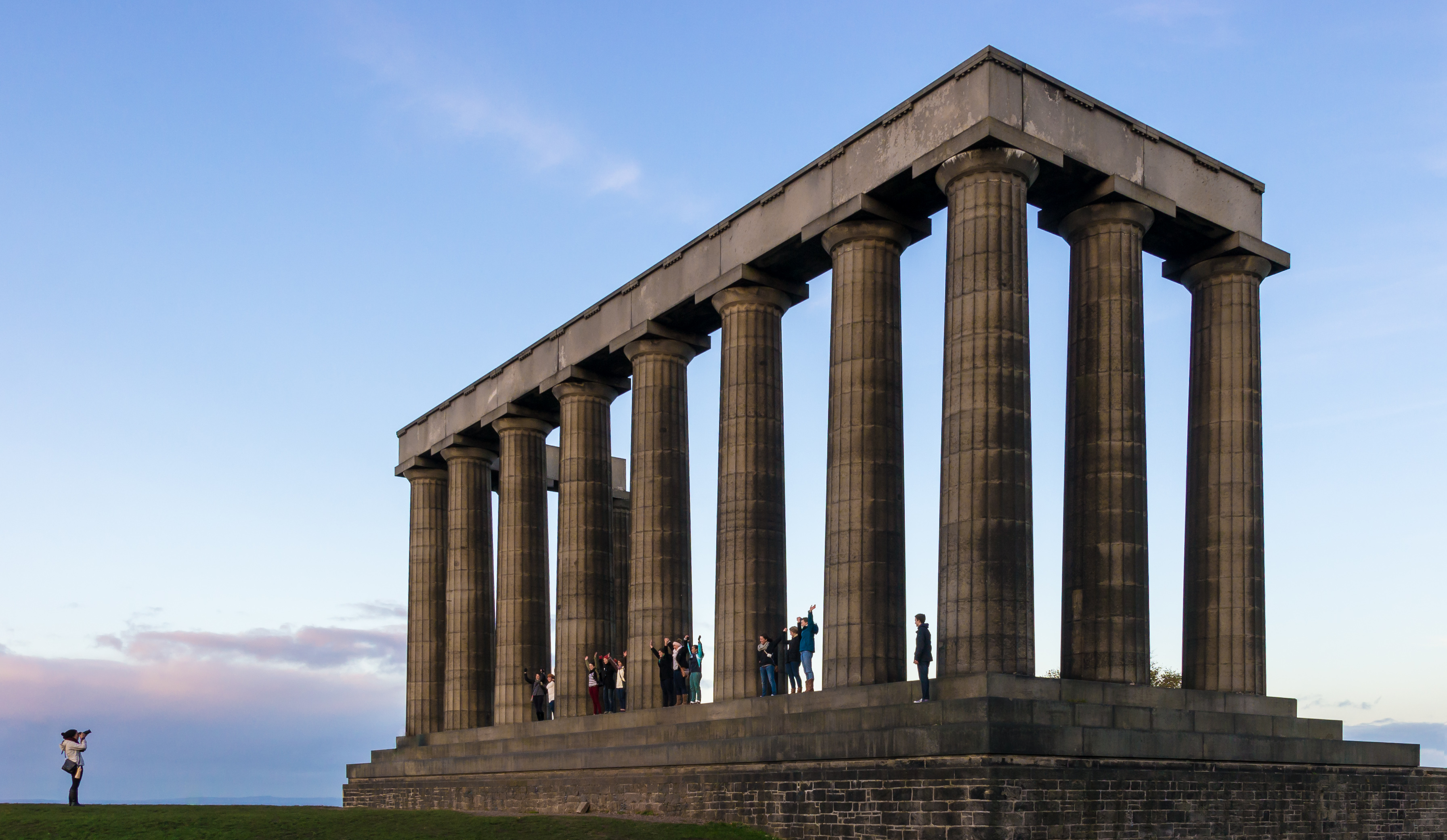
Tourists posing at the National Monument of Scotland

Archaeology Scotland, formerly known as the Council for Scottish Archaeology (CSA), is a membership organisation which seeks to promote the understanding of archaeology in Scotland. This group works with lay people and academia to help care for the great history of Scotland's archaeological heritage. Their charitable and philanthropic work serves to enrich the story and deep history of Scotland. The organization is responsible for coordinating a number of archaeology related events, such as Scottish Archaeology Month and Adopt-a-Monument.

== History and Background ==
The organisation began as a branch of the Council for British Archaeology, established in 1944. One of the primary leaders of the movement was Dr. W.D. Simpson. Dr. Simpson wanted to entrust this Scottish group to: help to preserve Scottish heritage, antiquities, relics, and ancient buildings; also to preserve ancient country houses and help them to remain inhabited; and carry out the proper archaeological excavation of castles and abbeys. It was also decreed that the Council for British Archaeology (CBA) should find appropriate resources to address urgent archaeological problems. In order to move this charter forward, the CBA needed to work hand in hand with the government to formulate measures to educate the public regarding the care and preservation of historic monuments. In 1949, the Scottish Regional Group of the CBA outlined their own objectives. These would include:

- The advancement of archaeology from the 19th century through prehistoric times
- Public education
- Preservation of ancient Scottish monuments
- Raising awareness of the study of archaeology in Scottish universities
- Working collaboratively with other organizations to grow museum activities

The original name of the organization was The Council for Scottish Archaeology. The Council for Scottish Archaeology became an independent body in 1988, and was reconstituted as a limited company in 2004. The name Archaeology Scotland was adopted in 2008.

Archaeology Scotland is a registered Scottish charity, and is dependent on the subscriptions and donations of supporters, grants from, Historic Environment Scotland and trusts and foundations.

== Current Organization and Structure ==
The organization is currently made up of trustees who answer to an appointed board of directors. The current director is Dr Gavin MacGregor, who took over from Eila Macqueen in 2022. Under Macqueen's leadership, there is a larger team of project managers, development managers, project officers, heritage training officers, and other assorted staff and administration.

== Activities ==
Archaeology Scotland provides a variety of relevant services and information, including educational resources and publications. The group co-ordinates a number of initiatives including Scottish Archaeology Month, which takes place every September as part of European Heritage Days. Hundreds of free archaeological and heritage themed events take place all over Scotland, allowing people to view usually unseen artefacts and sites. Archaeology Scotland also organises the annual Archaeological Research in Progress conference in partnership with the Society of Antiquaries of Scotland. One of the key fundraising awareness and initiatives is the Adopt-a-Monument event. Additionally, the Heritage Hero Awards and their journal "Discovery and Excavation in Scotland" is the premiere resource for learning more about current Scottish archaeological fieldwork. For more than 20 years, the organization has sponsored Scottish Archaeological Month (SAM) which works to engage people with the heritage and history of Scottish archaeology. Activities include lectures, performances, walking tours, and exhibitions. SAM takes place in September and runs through mid-October. The group also works with young people running summer schools and young archaeologists' clubs.

== See also ==
- Society of Antiquaries of Scotland
