= Society of Antiquaries of Scotland =

Senior antiquarian body of Scotland

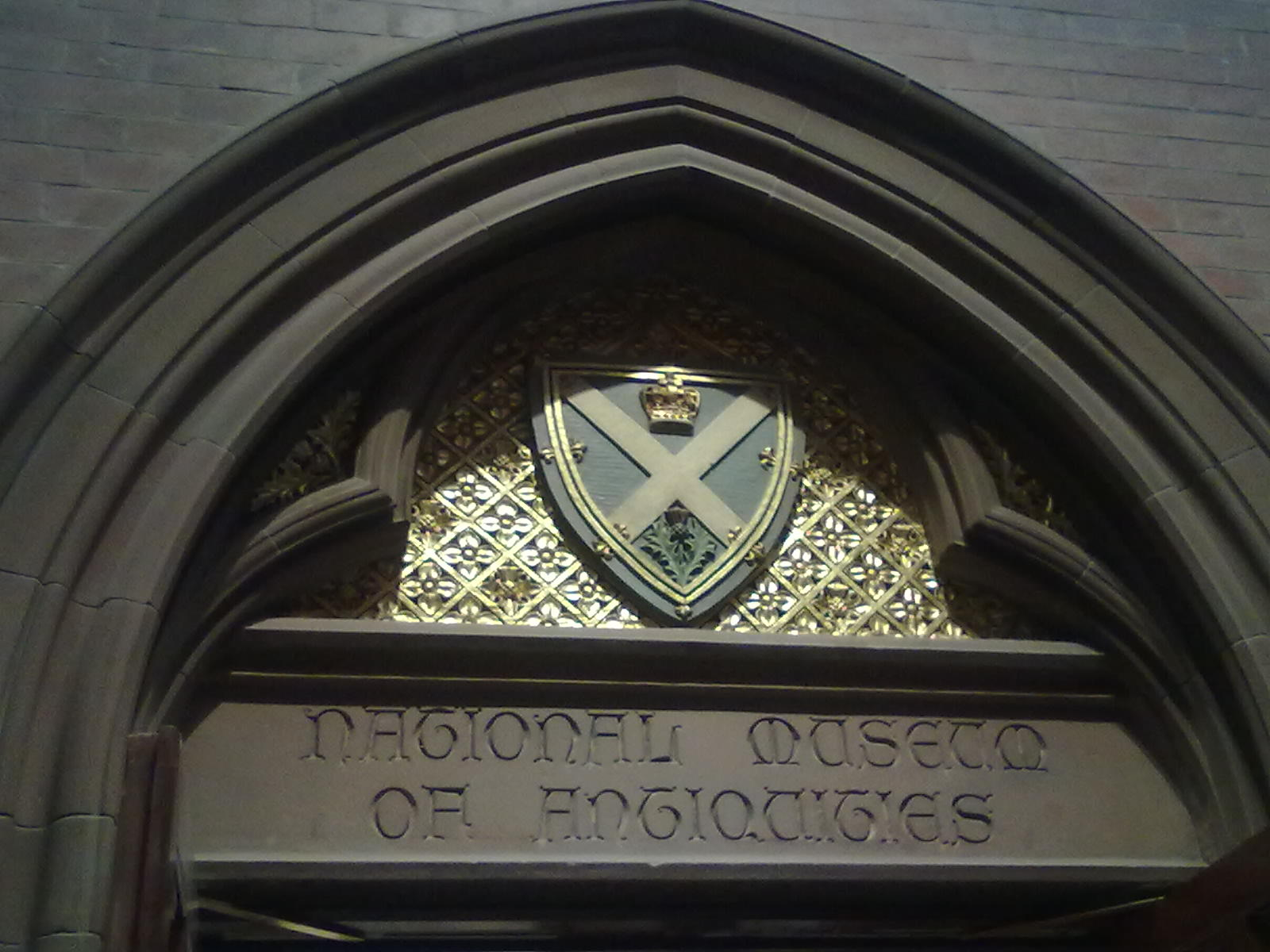
The coat of arms of the Society of Antiquaries of Scotland, above the entrance to the former National Museum of Antiquities, at the Scottish National Portrait Gallery.

The Society of Antiquaries of Scotland is the senior antiquarian body of Scotland, with its headquarters in the National Museum of Scotland, Chambers Street, Edinburgh. The Society's aim is to promote the cultural heritage of Scotland.

The usual style of post-nominal letters for fellows is FSAScot.

== History ==
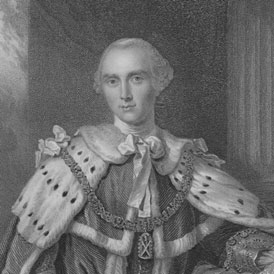
John Stuart, 3rd Earl of Bute, the former prime minister, was elected the first President of the Society in 1780.

The Society is the oldest antiquarian society in Scotland, and the second-oldest in Britain after the Society of Antiquaries of London. Founded by David Erskine, 11th Earl of Buchan on 18 December 1780, John Stuart, 3rd Earl of Bute, the former prime minister, was elected the first President. It was incorporated by Royal Charter in 1783, in the same year as the Royal Society of Edinburgh, and in their early years both societies shared accommodation on George Street and in the Royal Institution building on The Mound. Members of the Society collected artefacts of interest to Scottish history and culture from its foundation, and soon the Society developed a sizeable collection. In November 1851 the signing of a Deed of Conveyance with the Board of Manufactures on behalf of Parliament made the Society collections National Property. In 1891 the antiquaries moved into the purpose-built Scottish National Portrait Gallery and National Museum of Antiquities of Scotland, located on Queen Street. The National Museum of Antiquities of Scotland Act 1954 transferred the powers and duties relating to the Museum, previously vested in the Society of Antiquaries and the National Galleries, to a new Board.

Alexander Rhind left a bequest to the Society to fund a lecture series, the Rhind Lectures are still hosted by the Society; an online recording of these prestigious lectures has been made available to the public since 2009.

== Objects ==
The Society of Antiquaries of Scotland is a charitable organisation whose purpose is set out in its Royal Charter from 1783:

…a Society to investigate both antiquities and natural and civil history in general, with the intention that the talents of mankind should be cultivated and that the study of natural and useful sciences should be promoted.

The first Law of the Society focuses this further:

The purpose of the Society shall be the study of the Antiquities and History of Scotland, more especially by means of Archaeological Research.

The Society today is concerned with every aspect of the human past in Scotland. It draws on a wide range of experience through the Fellowship, and provides a voice for Scotland's heritage independent of the opinions of Government, University, or Agency. The Society is consulted by a wide range of organisations from central government to academic funding bodies such as the Arts & Humanities Research Council. The Society makes written responses to numerous consultations, some jointly with Archaeology Scotland (formerly CSA) and the Scottish Group of the Chartered Institute for Archaeologists. The Society worked closely with the Historic Environment Advisory Council for Scotland (HEACS was abolished by the Public Services Reform (Scotland) Act 2010 as part of the Scottish Government's policy to simplify the landscape of public bodies), and gave evidence to their working groups on heritage protection legislation and properties in care. The Society has also been actively involved in the Built Environment Forum Scotland, an umbrella body for NGOs in the built and historic environment sectors.

== Fellowship ==
Members of the Society have, since 1823, been known as Fellows of the Society. There are now thousands of Fellows spread across the globe, including Honorary Fellows elected for their outstanding scholarship. Fellowship recognises a person's support and contributions to the purpose and mission of the Society, and Fellows are permitted to use the post-nominals FSAScot (NB Not FSA (Scot) or similar). The Society has an international membership of around 2800 Fellows and a maximum of 25 Honorary Fellows. Admission to the Society is by election, and candidates must be supported by existing Fellows. The names of those seeking admission are then circulated to the whole Fellowship. Elections are held biannually at the Anniversary Meeting (AGM) on St Andrew's Day, 30 November, and in Spring, usually in April. Fundamental to being a candidate for election to the Fellowship is an interest or involvement in Scotland's past. Candidates are advised of the outcome of the election shortly after the ballot.

Margaret E. C. Stewart (1907–1986) was the first female Honorary Fellow.

== Other prizes and awards ==
The Society also encourages best practice and continued research into Scotland's past through various prizes and awards.

- The RBK Stevenson Award - This award is offered annually in recognition of the article published in the Proceedings on a topic that best reflects the scholarship and high standards of this distinguished individual, who was for many years the Keeper of the National Museum of Antiquities of Scotland and was President of the Society between 1975 and 1978.
- The Dorothy Marshall Medal - Awarded every three years by the Council of the Society for an outstanding contribution, in a voluntary capacity, to Scottish archaeological or related work.
- The Murray Prize for History - Awarded biennially to recognise original research published by the Society into the history of Scotland in the medieval and/or early modern periods (c AD 500 to AD 1700).
- Chalmers-Jervise Prize - Awarded biennially for the best paper published by the Society to cover any subject in the prehistory or archaeology of Scotland before AD 1100.

== Publications ==
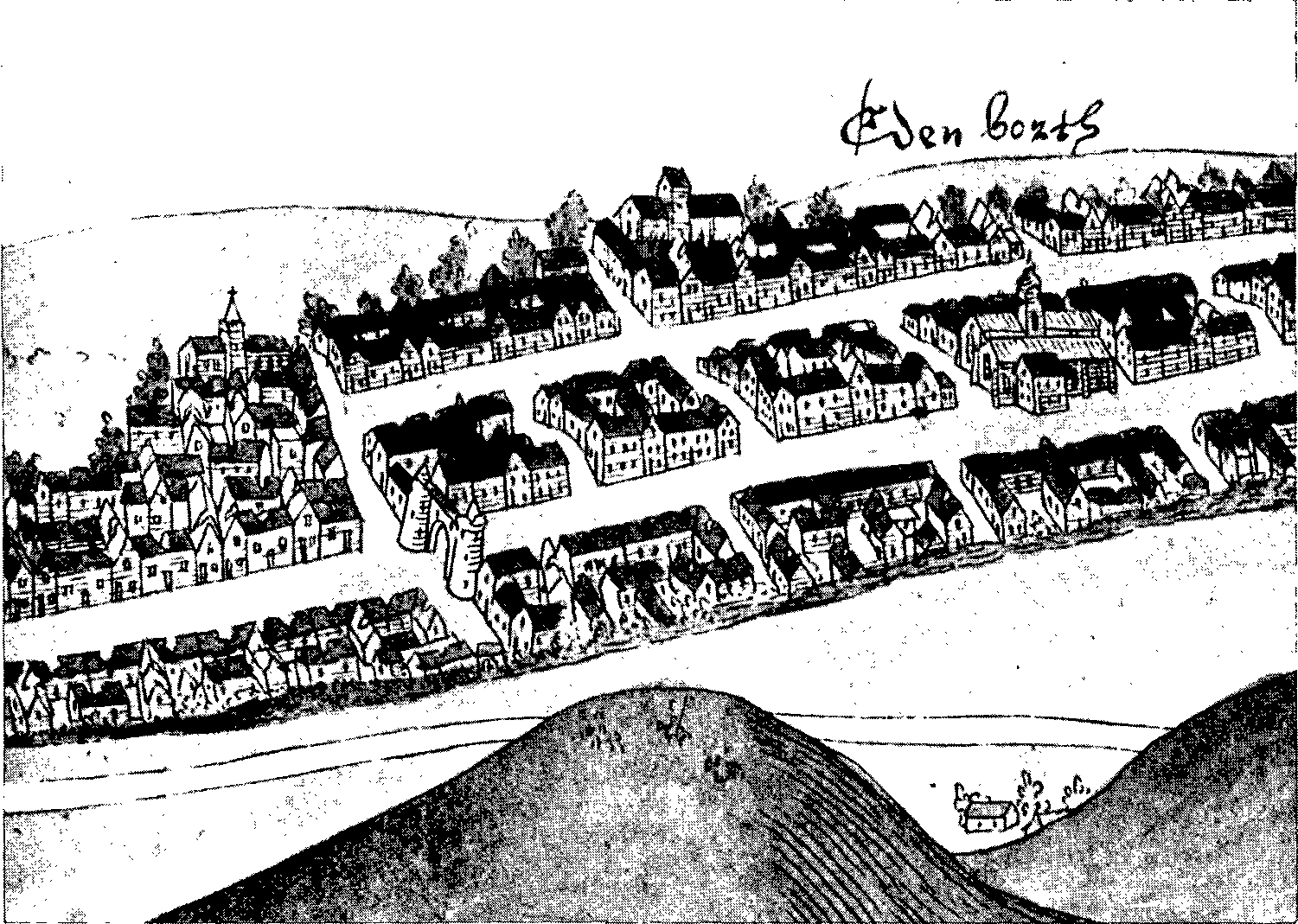
Sketch of Edinburgh made in 1544 looking south, showing the Netherbow Port between the High Street and the Canongate; published in the Proceedings of the Society of Antiquaries of Scotland in 1933.

The Society of Antiquaries of Scotland has three main publishing outputs:

- Peer-reviewed Books, previously known as monographs, covering a wide variety of topics in the history and archaeology of Scotland.
- The Proceedings of the Society of Antiquaries of Scotland (ISSN 0081-1564), a yearly peer-reviewed journal covering the latest archaeological and historical research in Scotland. The Society has made the entire run of the Proceedings since 1851, and its predecessor Archaeologica Scotica back to 1792, freely available on the internet.
- Scottish Archaeological Internet Reports (SAIR, ISSN 1473-3803) is a peer-reviewed online publication that includes larger and more data-rich projects. It is freely accessible without subscription or payment.

There is also a regular Society Newsletter (ISSN 0960-703X), and the Society publishes book reviews on their website.

== List of presidents ==
The following have served as presidents of the Society:

- John Stuart, 3rd Earl of Bute (1780–1792)
- James Graham, 4th Duke of Montrose (1792–1813)
- Lawrence Dundas, 1st Earl of Zetland (1813–1819)
- Francis Gray, 14th Lord Gray (1819–1823)
- Thomas Bruce, 7th Earl of Elgin and 11th Earl of Kincardine (1823–1841)
- James Bruce, 8th Earl of Elgin (1841–1844)
- Walter Montagu Douglas Scott, 5th Duke of Buccleuch (1844–1862)
- George Granville William Sutherland-Leveson-Gower, 3rd Duke of Sutherland (1872–1876)
- Schomberg Henry Kerr, 9th Marquess of Lothian (1876–1900)
- Sir Herbert Maxwell, 7th Baronet (1900–1913)
- John Abercromby, 5th Baron Abercromby (1913–1918)
- Thomas Gibson-Carmichael, 1st Baron Carmichael (1918–1923)
- John Stewart-Murray, 8th Duke of Atholl (1923–1933)
- George Macdonald (archaeologist) (1933–1940)
- Sir John Stirling-Maxwell, 10th Baronet (1940–1945)
- George Baillie-Hamilton, 12th Earl of Haddington (1945–1950)
- William Moir Calder (1950–1955)
- James Latham Clyde, Lord Clyde (1955–1960)
- James Frederick Gordon Thomson, the Hon Lord Migdale (1960–1965)
- James Scott-Elliot (1965–1967)
- Stuart Piggott (1967–1972)
- Kenneth Arthur Steer (1972–1975)
- Robert Barron Kerr Stevenson (1975–1978)
- Ronald Gordon Cant (1978–1981)
- Stuart Maxwell (1981–1984)
- Leslie Alcock (1984–1987)
- David Breeze (1987–1990)
- Anna Ritchie (1990–1993)
- Gordon Stirling Maxwell (1993–1996)
- Michael Lynch (1996–1999)
- James Neil Graham Ritchie (1999–2002)
- Lisbeth Margaret Thoms (2002–2005)
- Roger Mercer (2005–2008)
- Barbara E. Crawford (2008–2011)
- Alan Saville (2011–2014)
- David Hepburn Caldwell (2014–2020)
- Ian Ralston (2020–2023)
- Diana Murray (2023–Present)

== Notable vice presidents ==
- David Erskine, 11th Earl of Buchan, founder of the Society in 1780 and first vice president (1780–1792)
- Sir Walter Scott (1827–1829)
- Sir James Young Simpson (1860–1870)
- John Alexander Smith (1870–1873)

== See also ==
- Archaeology Scotland (1944)
- Glasgow Archaeological Society (1856)
- Scottish History Society (1886)
- List of Antiquarian Societies
