= Lisbeth Margaret Thoms =

British archaeologist

Lisbeth Margaret Thoms MBE FSA Scot is an archaeologist and heritage advisor who was involved in the development of urban archaeology in Scotland. She was awarded an MBE in 2008 for services to conservation in Scotland, and served as president of the Society of Antiquaries of Scotland from 2002 to 2005.

== Education and career ==
Lisbeth Thoms completed a social sciences degree at the University of Edinburgh in 1969 and then completed a diploma in archaeology at the University of Durham in 1970. She joined Dundee Museums in 1972 as an archaeologist, becoming Depute Curator of Museums and latterly Head of Heritage Services and Dundee City Council. In 1974, Lisbeth joined the Perth Archaeological Survey Team, which drew attention to the town’s archaeological potential. In 1996, she became a freelance heritage and archaeology consultant.

Lisbeth Thoms became a Fellow of the Society of Antiquaries of Scotland in 1968, serving as president from 2002 to 2005, and was elected as an Honorary Fellow in 2018. In 1976, she was a founder member of the Tayside and Fife Archaeological Committee and served as a member of the Ancient Monuments Board for Scotland and of the Advisory Panel on Treasure Trove. In 2008 she was awarded an MBE for services to conservation in Scotland.

== Selected publications ==
- Thoms, L. M. and Stratford P Halliday (2014). ‘Survey and excavation at two prehistoric hut-circles in Tulloch Field, Enochdhu, Strathardle, Perthshire; with an evaluation of their research and regional contexts’, Tayside and Fife Archaeological Committee, 1–19
- Thoms, L. M. (2005). Hidden depths: thirty years of archaeology in Scottish towns. Proceedings of the Society of Antiquaries of Scotland, 134, 7–15.
- Thoms, L. M. (1983). Trial excavation at-St Ann's Lane, Perth. Proceedings of the Society of Antiquaries of Scotland, 112, 437–454.
- Thoms, L. M. (1977). The Archaeology of Industrial Scotland. Edinburgh: Edinburgh University Press
