= Who Built Scotland =

2017 book

Who Built Scotland: A History of the Nation in Twenty-Five Buildings
- Cover of hardback edition
- Author: Alexander McCall Smith, Alistair Moffat, James Crawford, James Robertson, Kathleen Jamie
- Subject: Scottish architecture and history
- Publisher: Historic Environment Scotland
- Publication date: 14 September 2017
- Pages: 336
- ISBN: 9781849172240 (hardback)
- Website: Who Built Scotland

Who Built Scotland: A History of the Nation in Twenty-Five Buildings is a book of essays first published by Historic Environment Scotland in 2017. The 25 essays on the Scottish built environment, past and present, are contributed by five Scottish writers: novelist Alexander McCall Smith, history writer Alistair Moffat, publisher James Crawford, novelist James Robertson and poet Kathleen Jamie. The book was generally well received, with the main criticism being omissions from its "eclectic" selection of buildings.

== Publication history ==
The hardback edition was published on 14 September 2017. A paperback edition was published in 2018 (ISBN 978-1849172721); it bears the alternative subtitle 25 Journeys in Search of a Nation on the cover.

== Contents ==
Each of the five authors contributes five chapters. After an anonymous 3-page introduction, the essays are presented in order of the date of the buildings that they cover. Four of the sites are prehistoric and two other buildings also originally date from before 1000 AD. Around half of the sites chosen lie in the Scottish industrial belt and Central Lowlands, with four in Glasgow and three in Edinburgh; there are seven on Scottish islands and only a few in the Highlands, north-eastern Scotland and southern Scotland. One of the book's overarching themes is the effect of tourism.

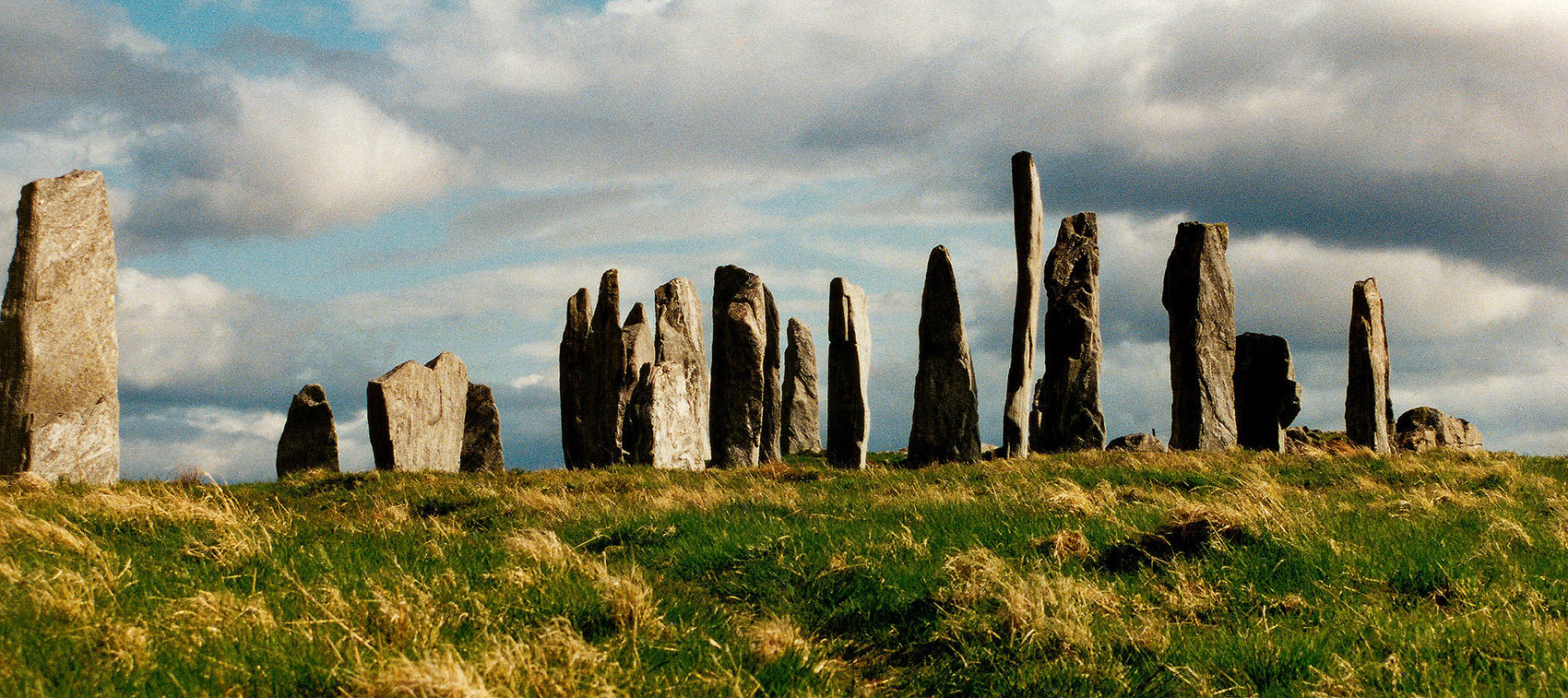
Calanais Standing Stones

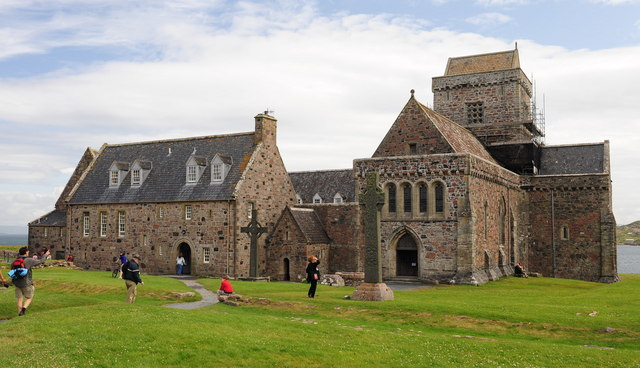
Iona Abbey

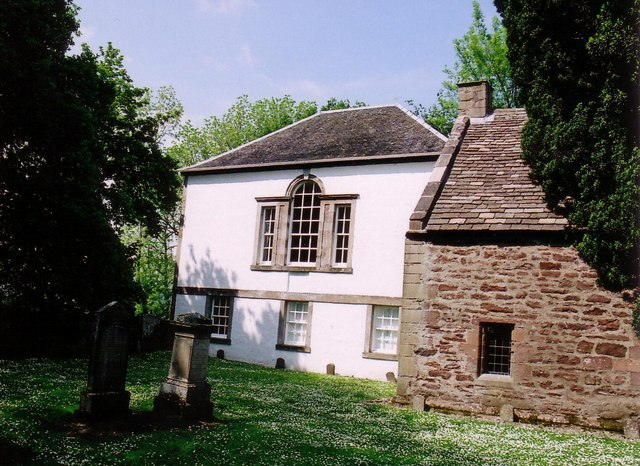
Innerpeffray Library

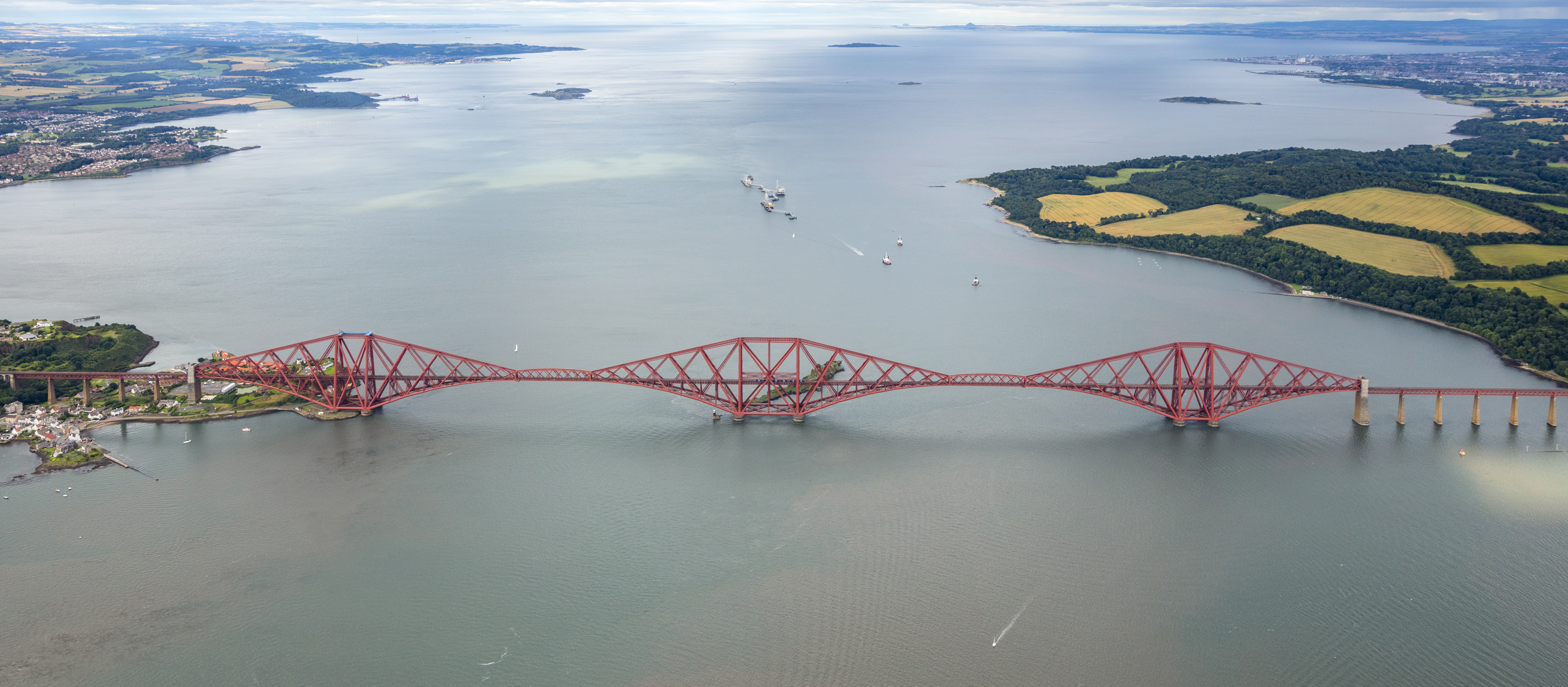
Forth Bridge

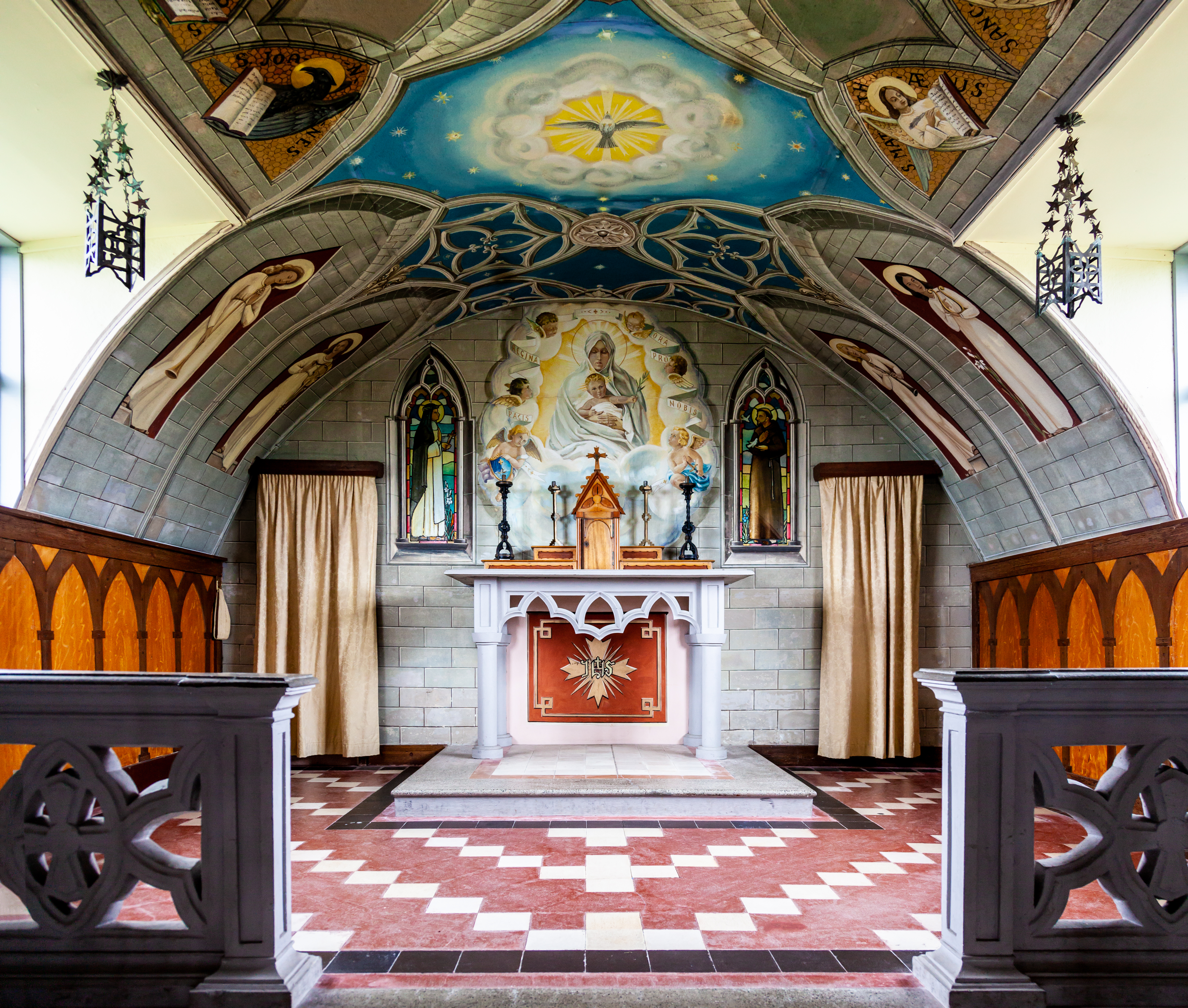
Italian Chapel interior

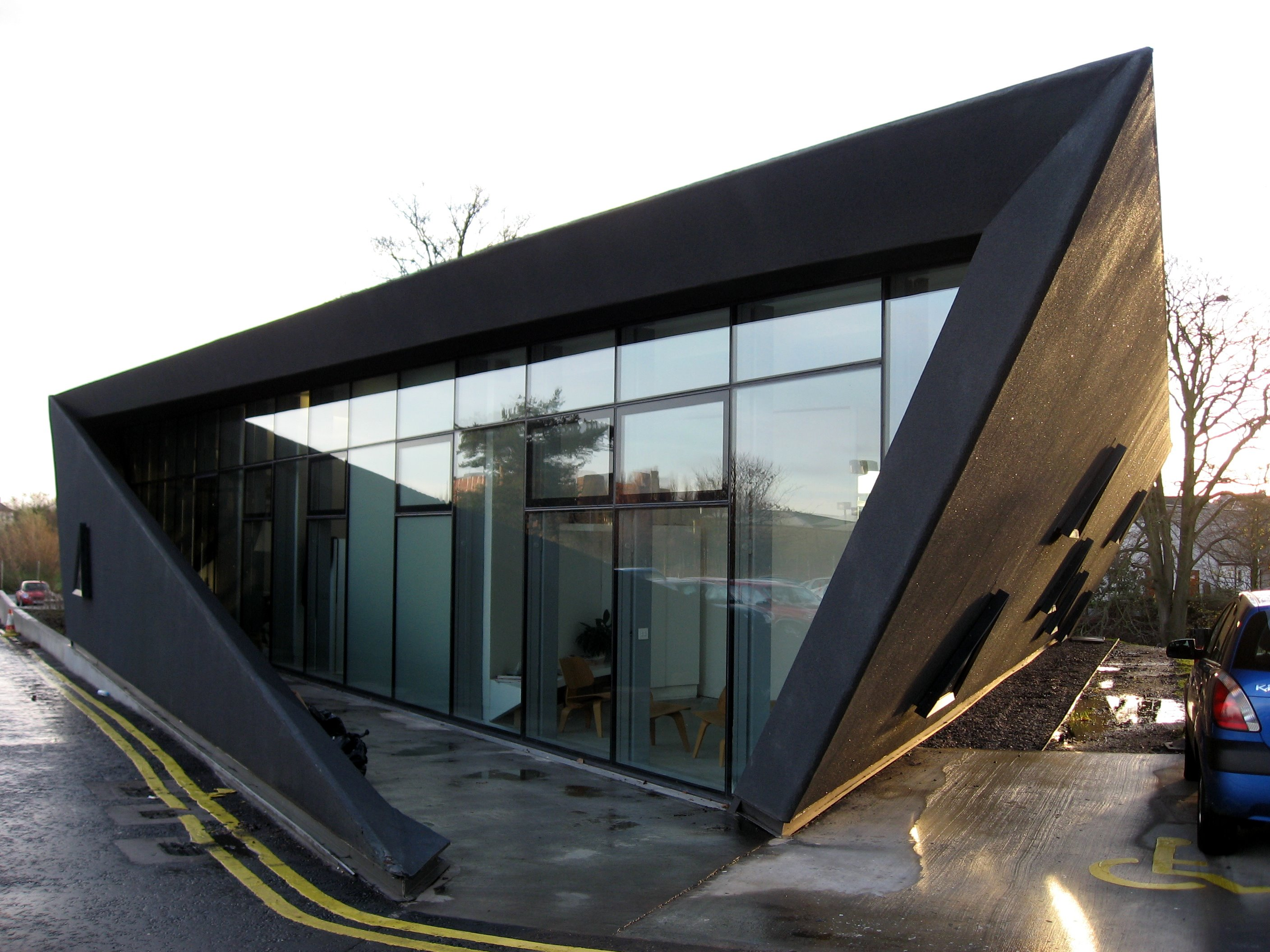
Maggie's Centre, Kirkcaldy, Fife

Date	Building	Author	Note
8000 BC	Geldie Burn, Cairngorms	Jamie	Various prehistoric sites in the River Dee area; also covers the area's modern history
3500 BC	Cairnpapple Hill, Midlothian	Moffat	Prehistoric religious and burial site on a low hill
3000 BC	Calanais, Isle of Lewis	Robertson	Prehistoric ritual standing stones
100 BC	Mousa Broch, Shetland	Jamie	Iron Age broch, home to storm petrels; also surveys other examples
563 AD	Iona Abbey	McCall Smith	Early Christian monastic community associated with St Columba
600s AD	Glasgow Cathedral	Jamie	Focuses on the 12th-century masons who worked on the cathedral that replaced the 7th-century church associated with Kentigern
1100s	Edinburgh Castle	Moffat	Possibly the earliest British fortification under continuous occupation; now a major tourist attraction
1503	The Great Hall, Stirling Castle	Crawford	Focuses on the extensive restoration of 1999, including the new hammerbeam roof
1600s	Innerpeffray Library, near Crieff	Robertson	Earliest public lending library in Scotland
1723	Mavisbank House, near Loanhead	Crawford	Ruined neoclassical country house
1791	Auld Alloway Kirk, Alloway	Robertson	Four ruined churches and Scottish church-building history, including Parliamentary kirks and the establishment of the Free Church of Scotland in 1843
1791–1820	Charlotte Square, Edinburgh	McCall Smith	Neoclassical square by Robert Adam in Edinburgh New Town
1800s	Glenlivet Distillery, Moray	Moffat	Oldest non-illicit whisky distillery in Scotland
1807	Bell Rock Lighthouse	McCall Smith	Lighthouse on a reef submerged at high tide, designed by Robert Stephenson and John Rennie
1811	Abbotsford House, near Melrose	Robertson	Novelist and poet Walter Scott's country house; also covers Brownsbank Cottage, home of poet Hugh MacDiarmid
1830s	Surgeons' Hall, Edinburgh	McCall Smith	Greek-revival headquarters of the Royal College of Surgeons of Edinburgh, designed by William Playfair
1881	Forth Bridge	Robertson	Focuses on the construction of the railway bridge, supervised by William Arrol
1896–1909	Glasgow School of Art	Moffat	Reminiscences about the architect, Charles Rennie Mackintosh
1903	Hampden Park, Glasgow	Crawford	The world's largest football stadium on completion
1940s	Italian Chapel, Lamb Holm	McCall Smith	Built and decorated by Italian prisoners of war who were constructing the Churchill Barriers
1948	Inchmyre Prefabs, Kelso	Moffat	Autobiographical account of childhood in a post-war prefab estate, built as a result of the 1944 Housing Act
1968	Anniesland Court, Glasgow	Jamie	A 22-storey high-rise block of flats, the only listed example in Scotland
1974	Sullom Voe, Shetland	Crawford	Oil storage terminal
2006	Maggie's Centre, Kirkcaldy, Fife	Jamie	Drop-in centre for cancer patients and carers by Zaha Hadid, one of eight across Scotland, in a movement founded by Maggie and Charles Jencks
2014	Sweeney's Bothy, Eigg	Crawford	Off-grid bothy for artists

The book includes full-page plates, mainly in colour, for all 25 buildings. There are also 33 black-and-white photographs within the text, an outline map showing the buildings' locations and a 15-page index.

== Critical reception ==
Allan Massie, reviewing the book for The Scotsman, considers all the contributions to be "admirable appreciations ... written with knowledge and enthusiasm" and states that the book as a whole "paints a fine picture of our strange and varied country and its history." He enjoys the personal element in the essays, singling out Moffat's autobiographical chapter on growing up in a Kelso pre-fab. He also highlights the contributions of Moffat on Glenlivet Distillery, Jamie on Geldie Burn, McCall Smith on Edinburgh's Charlotte Square and Surgeons' Hall, Robertson on Abbotsford House and the Forth Bridge, and Crawford on Mavisbank House. He additionally praises the book's photographs. Harry McGrath, in a review for The Herald, calls it "a very good book; edifying and, at times, revelatory". He praises the high quality of the writing in all the submissions, but prefers the "passion" that Moffat brings to his "rather lovely, meditative essay" on Cairnpapple Hill to McCall Smith's "superior but somewhat remote" article on Iona Abbey. He also highlights Crawford's chapter on Stirling Castle's Great Hall, as well as Robertson's one on Abbotsford.

The five-star review in Scottish Field magazine praises the range and diversity of choices, and the inclusion of lesser-known sites. Describing the book as a "fascinating alternative take on the country's social, political and cultural histories", it finds the human stories most memorable, singling out Jamie's moving essay on Maggie's Centre, named for co-founder Maggie Keswick Jencks, for cancer patients and their carers. An editorial review at the Undiscovered Scotland website describes the book as "inspiring and fascinating" and having "considerable lasting value." It enjoys the variation in form across the chapters, as well as the added breadth achieved by several articles reviewing more than one building. It welcomes the inclusion of unexpected sites such as Innerpeffray Library, Mavisbank House, the Italian Chapel and Sullom Voe, and particularly praises Moffat's "deeply personal" article on the Inchmyre Prefabs, and the light it sheds on "a way of life that was once quite common across Scotland ... but is now largely forgotten."

The book's "eclectic to the point of being quirky" selection of sites was, however, criticised by some reviewers. Massie questions the worth of including Hampden Park and Sullom Voe; he criticises the uneven coverage of Scottish history and geography, pointing out the omission of town buildings in smaller burghs and 18th- and 19th-century rural buildings. Both Massie and McGrath criticise the focus on Edinburgh; the former highlights the exclusion of Aberdeen, while the latter regrets the omission of any of Scotland's new towns. A further critique came from McGrath: noting that only one of the "kenspeckle squad" of contributors is a woman, he considers the book to be dominated by the male perspective, stating that "Only Kathleen Jamie is consistently aware of the fact that women were also involved in building Scotland."
