= Historic Scotland =

Executive agency responsible for historic monuments in Scotland

- Alba Aosmhor
- Logo of Historic Scotland

Executive agency overview
- Formed: 1991
- Dissolved: 1 October 2015
- Superseding Executive agency: Historic Environment Scotland
- Jurisdiction: Scottish Government
- Status: Abolished
- Headquarters: Longmore House, Edinburgh
- Website: www.historicenvironment.scot

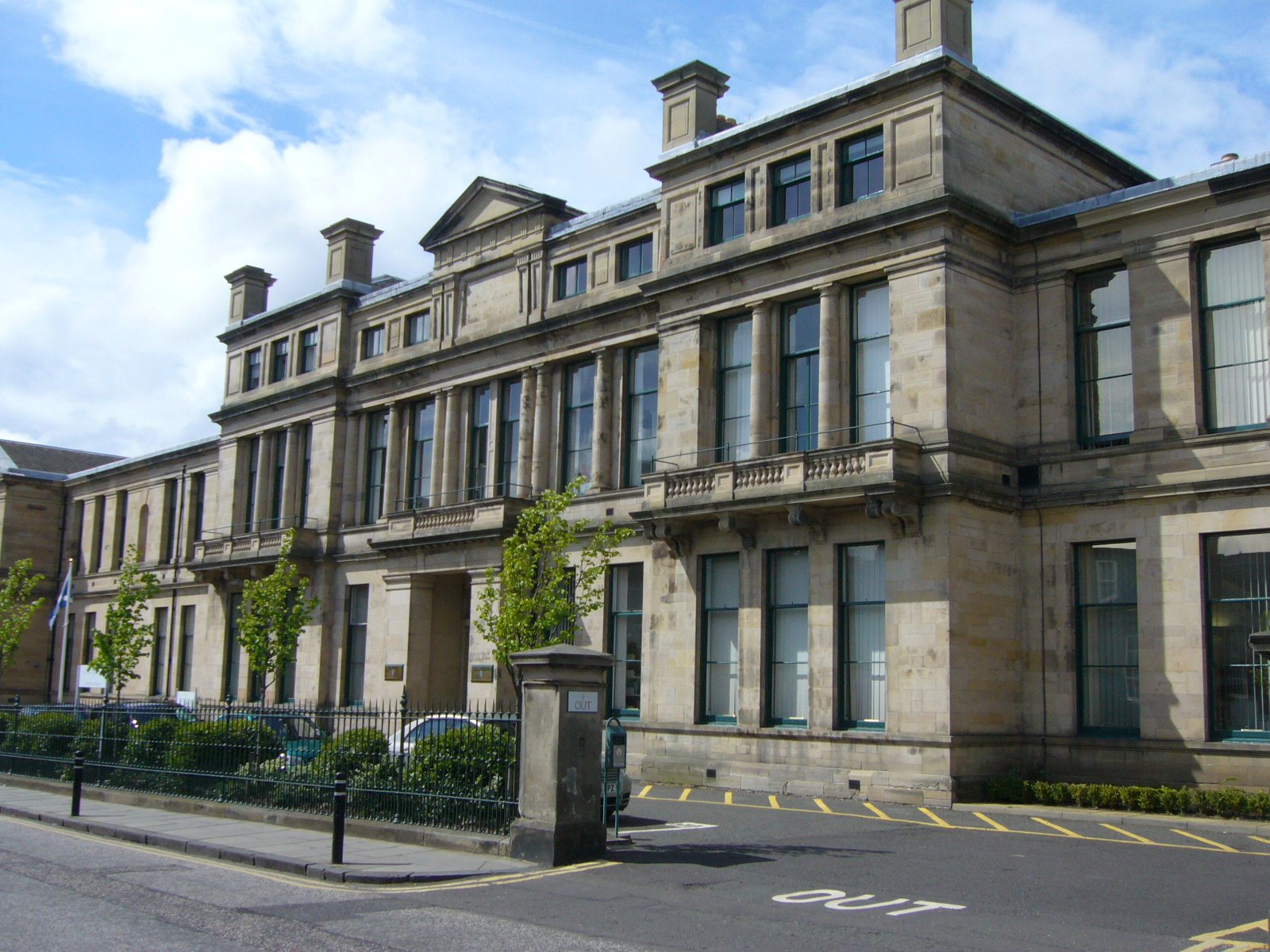
Historic Scotland was based at Longmore House, Edinburgh

Historic Scotland (Scottish Gaelic: Alba Aosmhor) was an executive agency of the Scottish Office and later the Scottish Government from 1991 to 2015, responsible for safeguarding Scotland's built heritage and promoting its understanding and enjoyment. Under the terms of a Bill of the Scottish Parliament published on 3 March 2014, Historic Scotland was dissolved and its functions were transferred to Historic Environment Scotland (HES) on 1 October 2015. HES also took over the functions of the Royal Commission on the Ancient and Historical Monuments of Scotland.

== Role ==
Historic Scotland was a successor organisation to the Ancient Monuments Division of the Ministry of Works and the Scottish Development Department. It was created as an agency in 1991 and was attached to the Scottish Executive Education Department, which embraces all aspects of the cultural heritage, in May 1999. As part of the Scottish Government, Historic Scotland was directly accountable to the Scottish Ministers.

In 2002, proposals to restore Castle Tioram in the West Highlands by putting a roof back on were blocked by Historic Scotland, which favoured stabilising it as a ruin. This position was supported in an extensive local Public Inquiry at which the arguments for both sides were heard. It has been implied that this dispute has led to a review of the operations of the organisation.

After widespread consultation, Historic Scotland published a comprehensive series of Scottish Historic Environment Policy papers, consolidated into a single volume, in October 2008.

The agency's Framework Document sets out the responsibilities of the Scottish Ministers and the agency's Chief Executive. Its Corporate Plan sets out its targets and performance against them.

Historic Scotland and the Glasgow School of Art's Digital Design Studio formed the Centre for Digital Documentation and Visualization to promote the documentation and 3D representation of heritage objects, architecture, and environments with laser scanning and 3D visualization software.

== Properties ==
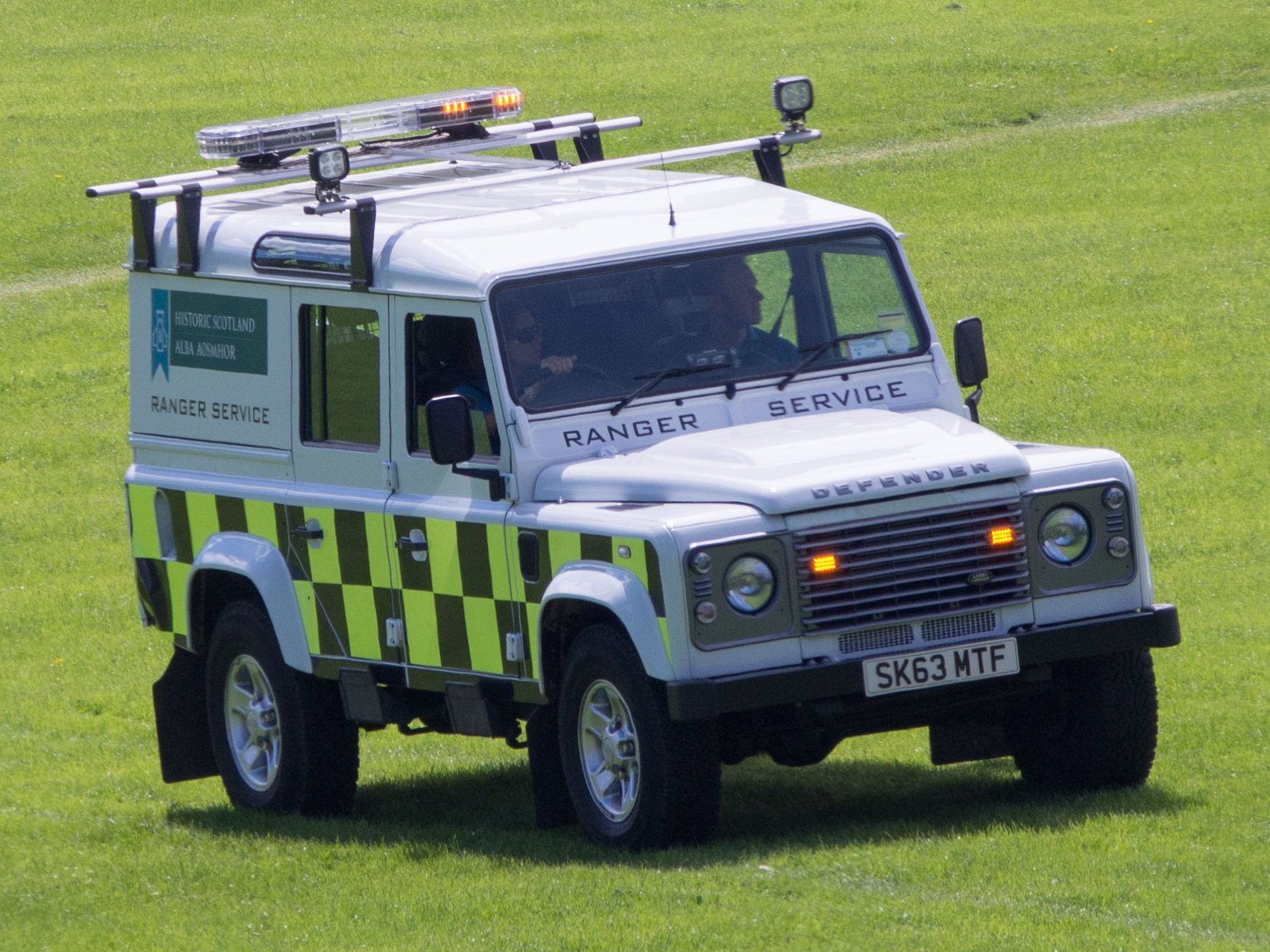
Historic Scotland Ranger Service driving through Holyrood Park, Edinburgh

Historic Scotland had direct responsibility for maintaining and running over 360 monuments in its care, about a quarter of which are staffed and charge admission. These properties have additional features such as guidebooks, books, and other resources. Historic Scotland sought to increase the number of events run at its sites, most frequently designed to engage young people with history. Similarly, new museums and visitor centres were opened, notably at Arbroath Abbey and Urquhart Castle. There was also a hospitality section, which makes some properties available for wedding receptions and other functions.

== Membership ==
Membership in Historic Scotland was promoted by the organisation, with benefits such as free entry to all their properties and over 400 events for the duration of the annual membership, as well as half-price entry to properties in England (under the care of English Heritage), Wales (under the care of Cadw), and the Isle of Man (under the care of Manx National Heritage), becoming free in subsequent years. Lifetime memberships were also available, and all members received the quarterly magazine 'Historic Scotland'.

== See also ==
- Royal Commission on the Ancient and Historical Monuments of Scotland
- Scottish Ten
