= Historic Environment Scotland =

Scottish government agency

- Àrainneachd Eachdraidheil Alba

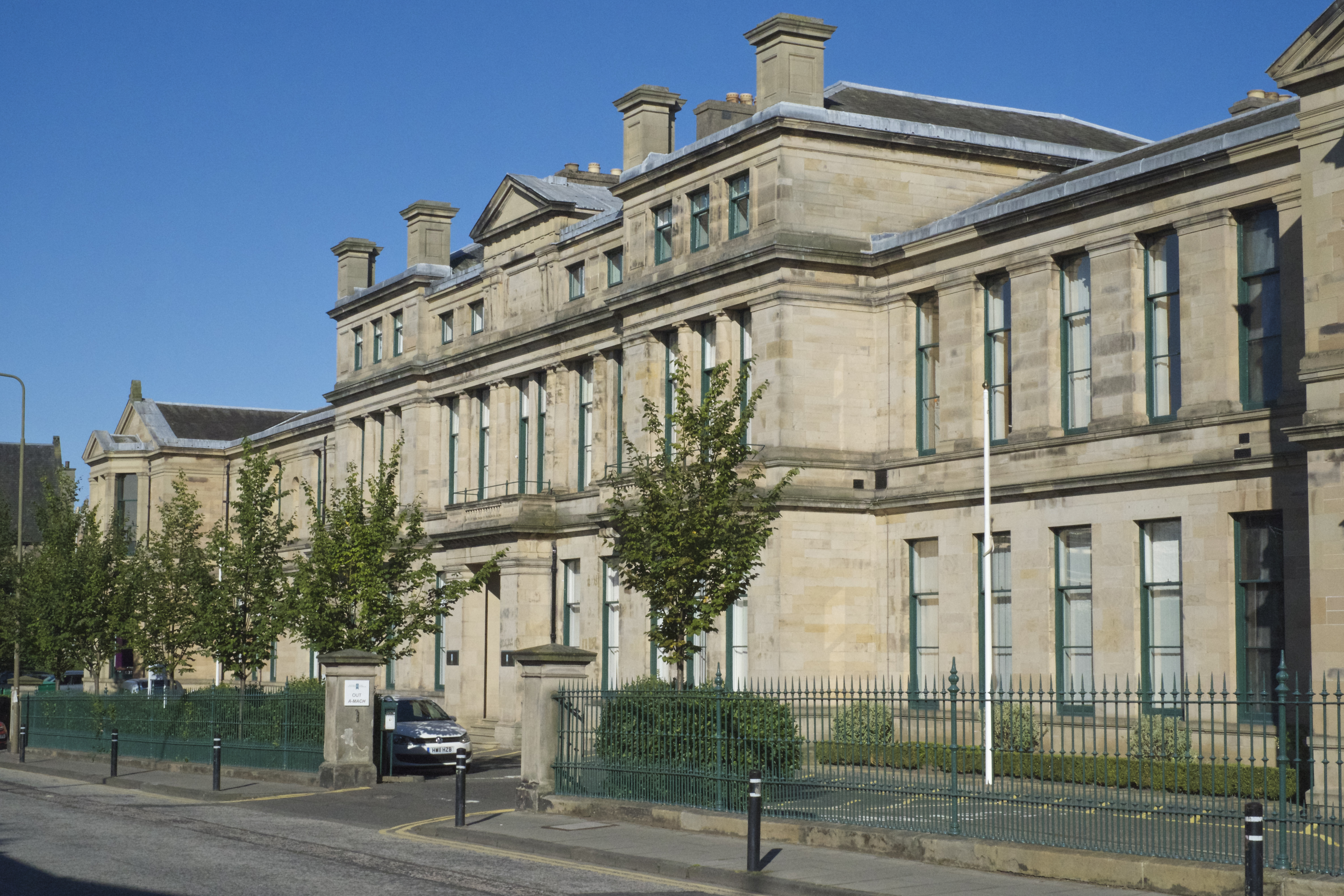
- Longmore House in Edinburgh, headquarters of Historic Environment Scotland

Organisation overview
- Formed: 1 October 2015; 11 years ago
- Preceding agencies: Historic Scotland; Royal Commission on the Ancient and Historical Monuments of Scotland
- Type: Non-departmental public body
- Jurisdiction: Scottish Government
- Headquarters: Longmore House Edinburgh, Scotland
- Employees: 1,500+ (incl. volunteers)
- Minister responsible: Màiri McAllan MSP, Cabinet Secretary for Culture
- Organisation executives: Ronnie Hinds, Chairman (interim); Stephen Uphill, Chief Executive (interim)
- Website: www.historicenvironment.scot

Historic Environment Scotland (HES) (Scottish Gaelic: Àrainneachd Eachdraidheil Alba) is an executive non-departmental public body responsible for investigating, caring for and promoting Scotland's historic environment. HES was formed in 2015 from the merger of government agency Historic Scotland with the Royal Commission on the Ancient and Historical Monuments of Scotland (RCAHMS).

== History ==
The responsibilities of HES were formerly split between Historic Scotland, a government agency responsible for properties of national importance, and the Royal Commission on the Ancient and Historical Monuments of Scotland (RCAHMS), which collected and managed records about Scotland's historic environment. Under the terms of a Bill of the Scottish Parliament published on 3 March 2014, the pair were dissolved and their functions transferred to Historic Environment Scotland, on 1 October 2015.

HES is a non-departmental public body with charitable status, governed by a board of trustees appointed by the Scottish Ministers. The body is charged with implementing "Our Past, Our Future", Scotland's historic environment strategy, and has responsibility for buildings and monuments in state care, as well as national collections of manuscripts, drawings and photographs. Beyond these collections, HES provides funding and guidance for conservation works and education across Scotland.

The Scottish Government appointed Jane Ryder OBE the Chair of Historic Environment Scotland's Board of Trustees in 2019, followed by Dr Hugh Hall in 2022, then Sir Mark Jones in September 2025. Ronnie Hinds was appointed interim chair in July 2026.

Historic Environment Scotland's first Chief Executive was Alex Paterson from 2016 to 2023, with his successor Katerina Brown appointed in September 2024. Stephen Uphill was appointed interim Chief Executive in September 2026.

Canmore was an online database maintained by HES until 2025 when it was replaced by Trove. Previously it was maintained by the RCAHMS. The National Collection of Aerial Photography is also now a sub-brand of HES. The collections are primarily stored in John Sinclair House and plans for a new collection centre, Archive House in Bonnyrigg, were announced in July 2023 with completion by 2026 anticipated. These plans were suspended in July 2024 due to escalating costs.

== Properties ==
HES maintains more than 300 properties of national importance some of which are staffed and charge admission such as Edinburgh Castle, Skara Brae and Fort George. These properties have additional features such as guidebooks, books, visitor centres and other resources.

As a result of tactile masonry surveys beginning in 2021 70 sites were either closed or partially closed to the public due to perceived risk of falling masonry. Some sites remain closed in 2026.

HES manages Holyrood Park and following a rock fall from Salisbury Crags in September 2018, closed public access to the Radical Road. Plans to partially reopen it were announced in September 2025.

== Membership ==
Membership under the brand name Historic Scotland is promoted by the organisation, with benefits such as free entry to all their properties and events for the duration of the annual membership, as well as half-price or free entry to properties in England (under the care of English Heritage), Wales (under the care of Cadw), and the Isle of Man (under the care of Manx National Heritage). Lifetime memberships are also available, and all members receive the quarterly magazine 'Historic Scotland'.

== Controversies ==
In September 2025 the chairman, Hugh Hall, resigned before the end of his term amidst ongoing press reporting of infighting, racist language, financial impropriety and the misuse of corporate entertainment by senior leaders in the organisation. On 22 September 2025 Sir Mark Jones was appointed chairman and on 2 December 2025 an Interim Chief Operating Officer was appointed. The Auditor General for Scotland published a report on 16 December 2025 that said there were unacceptable weaknesses in HES's governance arrangements and noted that £2.9 million had been spent on the cancelled Archive House project.

It was reported in April 2026 that the Chief Executive would not face any disciplinary action following an investigation for a grievance lodged by seven directors, and that Sir Mark Jones was intending to stand down as chair. Two directors appealed the outcome of the grievance investigation in July 2026. Katerina Brown resigned as Chief Executive in September 2026 and was immediately replaced by the interim Chief Operating Officer, Stephen Uphill.

The independent Organisational and Cultural review was published in May 2026 with 30 recommendations and the observation that the organisation had "not been well served by a combination of unproductive relationships between the HES Board and senior executives, a lack of joint visible leadership and limited collective responsibility." The recommendations were accepted in full with a new operating model to be in place by March 2027.

== See also ==
- List of Historic Environment Scotland properties
- Listed buildings in Scotland
- Scheduled monument
- Scottish Ten
- NatureScot
- National Trust for Scotland
- Who Built Scotland
- Organisations which play a similar role to HES in the other countries of the United Kingdom:
  - Cadw and the Royal Commission on the Ancient and Historical Monuments of Wales
  - Historic England and English Heritage
  - The Historic Environment Division of the Department for Communities in Northern Ireland (previously part of the Northern Ireland Environment Agency)
