= Royal Commission on the Ancient and Historical Monuments of Scotland =

1908–2015 Scottish government agency

Coordinates: 55°56′27.37″N 3°10′47.08″W

Logo of the RCAHMS

The Royal Commission on the Ancient and Historical Monuments of Scotland (RCAHMS) was an executive non-departmental public body of the Scottish Government that was "sponsored" [financed and with oversight] through Historic Scotland, an executive agency of the Scottish Government.

As one of the country's National Collections, it was responsible for recording, interpreting and collecting information about the built and historic environment. This information, which relates to buildings, sites, and ancient monuments of archaeological, architectural and historical interest (including maritime sites and underwater constructions), as well as historical aspects of the landscape, was then made available to the public, mainly at no cost.

It was established (shortly ahead of parallel commissions for Wales and England) by a Royal Warrant of 1908, which was revised in 1992.

The RCAHMS merged with government agency Historic Scotland to form Historic Environment Scotland, a new executive non-departmental public body on 1 October 2015.

== History ==
The Royal Commission was established in 1908, twenty-six years after the passage of the Ancient Monuments Protection Act 1882, which provided the first state protection for ancient monuments in the United Kingdom, and eight years after the passage of the wider-ranging Ancient Monuments Protection Act 1900. Critics – including David Murray in his Archaeological Survey of the United Kingdom (1896) and Gerard Baldwin Brown in his Care of Ancient Monuments (1905) – had argued that, for the legislation to be effective, detailed lists of significant monuments needed to be compiled; and had also made unfavourable comparisons between the policies of Britain and its European neighbours. Brown, Professor of Fine Art at the University of Edinburgh, explicitly proposed that the issues should be addressed by a Royal Commission, comparable to the Royal Commission on Historical Manuscripts. His suggestion was favourably received by Sir John Sinclair, Secretary for Scotland, and, following a brief period of consultation, the Royal Commission on the Ancient and Historical Monuments of Scotland was established on 14 February 1908, with Brown as one of its first Commissioners. The equivalent Royal Commission for Wales was established in August 1908; and that for England in October 1908.

== Activities ==
The Commission was based in Edinburgh where it had a huge selection of photographs and drawings for consultation. It also published a range of books and documents on Scottish architecture and archaeology. Study was also increasingly conducted of previously neglected industrial and agricultural constructions, as well as 20th-century buildings, including high-rise tower blocks.

RCAHMS maintained a database/archive of the sites, monuments and buildings of Scotland's past, known as the National Monuments Record of Scotland (NMRS). A growing proportion of RCAHMS's own survey material and material deposited in the archive by others was made available through online databases such as Canmore.

Since 1976, RCAHMS conducted intensive aerial survey of archaeological sites, buildings, landscapes and natural features. In addition to its holdings of its own (mainly oblique) aerial photographs, it held the National Collection of Aerial Photography, one of the largest and most important aerial imagery collections in the world, containing over 1.8 million aerial photographs of Scotland including large numbers of Royal Air Force oblique and vertical aerial photographs taken of Scotland during and in the years after the Second World War, as well as post-war Ordnance Survey, local and national government, commercial vertical aerial photographs, and over 10 million images of international sites as part of The Aerial Reconnaissance Archives (TARA).

The RCAHMS in conjunction with Historic Scotland hosted a map-based GIS portal called PASTMAP. This allowed Historic Scotland, NMRS, Scottish Natural Heritage and some Local Authority Sites and Monuments data sets to be viewed together.

Other online resources managed by RCAHMS included Scran, a UK charity with a learning image service of over 367,000 images, clip art, movies and sounds from museums, galleries, archives and the media; and Scotland's Places, a partnership website giving searchable access to the collections of RCAHMS, the National Records of Scotland and the National Library of Scotland.

RCAHMS was one of the first national collections in Scotland to embed social media into its online services, enabling user generated images and information to be added to the national database Canmore. An outreach programme included publications, exhibitions, induction and training sessions for students and other groups, and a series of free lunchtime lectures, as well as daily Facebook and Twitter feeds.

From 2011, the RCAHMS maintained the Buildings at Risk Register for Scotland on behalf of Historic Scotland. The register was formerly maintained by the Scottish Civic Trust.

Under the terms of a Bill of the Scottish Parliament published on 3 March 2014 RCAHMS would be dissolved and its responsibilities including the management of collections undertaken by a new executive Non-departmental public body to be called Historic Environment Scotland, which would also take over the property management responsibilities of Historic Scotland. This occurred on 1 October 2015. A final publication entitled 'An Inventory for the Nation' was published in the same month, detailing RCAHMS' activities over the past century.

== Area Inventories ==
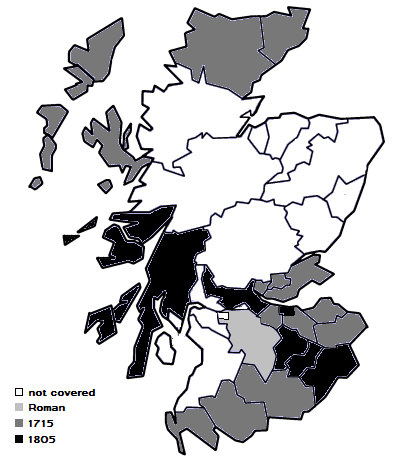
Coverage of Inventory volumes with date ranges (Orkney and Shetland not shown)

Initially, RCAHMS recorded all buildings and monuments of note until the year 1707. This was later updated to 1805. The findings were published in a series of inventories. Changes in what constitutes a construction "of note", plus developments in how the public could access this information, led to the abandonment of the inventories after publication of the last Argyll volume in 1992. Consequently, only approximately one-half of Scotland was covered by this method.

Although the volumes are now all out-of-print, they are available online on the Scotland's Places website, through most large public libraries, or via Historic Environment Scotland.

- First Report and Inventory of Monuments and Constructions in the County of Berwick (HMSO, 1909)
- Second Report and Inventory of Monuments and Constructions in the County of Sutherland (HMSO, 1911)
- Third Report and Inventory of Monuments and Constructions in the County of Caithness (HMSO, 1911)
- Fourth Report and Inventory of Monuments and Constructions in Galloway, Volume I, County of Wigtown (HMSO, 1912)
- Fifth Report and Inventory of Monuments and Constructions in Galloway, Volume II, County of the Stewartry of Kirkcudbright (HMSO, 1914)
- Sixth Report and Inventory of Monuments and Constructions in the County of Berwick (revised issue, HMSO, 1915)
- Seventh Report and Inventory of Monuments and Constructions in the County of Dumfries (HMSO, 1920)
- Eighth Report and Inventory of Monuments and Constructions in the County of East Lothian (HMSO, 1924)
- Ninth Report and Inventory of Monuments and Constructions in the Outer Hebrides, Skye and the Small Isles (HMSO, 1928)
- Tenth Report and Inventory of Monuments and Constructions in the Counties of Midlothian and West Lothian (HMSO, 1929)
- Eleventh Report and Inventory of Monuments and Constructions in the Counties of Fife, Kinross and Clackmannan (HMSO, 1933)
- Twelfth Report with an Inventory of the Ancient Monuments of Orkney and Shetland (HMSO, 1946)
  - Volume I, Report and Introduction
  - Volume II, Inventory of Orkney
  - Volume III, Inventory of Shetland
- An Inventory of the Ancient and Historical Monuments of the City of Edinburgh (with the Thirteenth Report of the Commission, HMSO, 1951)
- An Inventory of the Ancient and Historical Monuments of Roxburghshire (with the Fourteenth Report of the Commission, 2 volumes, HMSO, 1956)
- An Inventory of the Ancient and Historical Monuments of Selkirkshire (with the Fifteenth Report of the Commission, HMSO, 1957)
- Stirlingshire. An Inventory of the Ancient Monuments (with the Sixteenth Report of the Commission, 2 volumes, HMSO, 1963)
- Peeblesshire. An Inventory of the Ancient Monuments (with the Seventeenth Report of the Commission, 2 volumes, HMSO, 1967)
- Argyll. An Inventory of the Ancient Monuments, Volume 1, Kintyre (with the Eighteenth Report of the Commission, HMSO, 1971)
- Argyll. An Inventory of the Ancient Monuments, Volume 2, Lorn (with the Nineteenth Report of the Commission, HMSO, 1975)
- Lanarkshire. An Inventory of the Prehistoric and Roman Monuments (with the Twentieth Report of the Commission, HMSO, 1978)
- Argyll. An Inventory of the Ancient Monuments, Volume 3, Mull, Tiree, Coll and Northern Argyll (excluding the early medieval and later monuments of Iona) (with the Twenty-first Report of the Commission, HMSO, 1980)
- Argyll. An Inventory of the Ancient Monuments, Volume 4, Iona (with the Twenty-second Report of the Commission, HMSO, 1982)
- Argyll. An Inventory of the Ancient Monuments, Volume 5, Islay, Jura, Colonsay and Oronsay (with the Twenty-third Report of the Commission, HMSO, 1984)
- Argyll. An Inventory of the Ancient Monuments, Volume 6, Mid Argyll and Cowal: Prehistoric and Early Medieval Monuments (with the Twenty-fourth Report of the Commission, HMSO, 1988)
- Argyll. An Inventory of the Ancient Monuments, Volume 7, Mid Argyll and Cowal: Medieval and Later Monuments (HMSO, 1992)

A supplementary work entitled Late Medieval Monumental Sculpture in the West Highlands was published in 1977, augmenting the content of not only the contemporaneous Argyll volumes but the much earlier Outer Hebrides volume of 1928.

Three further publications, North East Perth: An Archaeological Landscape (1990), South East Perth: An Archaeological Landscape (1994) and Eastern Dumfriesshire: An Archaeological Landscape (1997) were appended to the series. As the titles suggest these were concerned with archaeological remains rather than significant above-ground structures. Unlike all earlier volumes, these publications used the boundaries of the Local Government (Scotland) Act 1973. Hence 'Perth' refers to an area within Perth and Kinross District rather than historic Perthshire. The Dumfriesshire volume related to both the eastern end of the historic county and the post-1973 district as the areas were identical. To date the Dumfriesshire volume is the only area to be revisited as part of a completely new inventory.

RCAHMS also published a series of lists covering archaeological sites and monuments which simply enumerated and identified, rather than interpreted, historic structures. As before, this series did not see completion. The series of 29 lists was begun in 1978 with the districts of Clackmannan and Falkirk within Central Region and concluded with the Easter Ross area of Ross and Cromarty District of Highland Region in 1989.

== Commissioners and staff ==
As originally established, the RCAHMS was operated by a group of Commissioners, including a chairman and a Secretary. The Secretary was originally the person who wrote the Commission's report and undertook the required fieldwork, but later adopted a role similar to that of a chief executive. The chairperson always had a key role in the operation of the Commission, and, at one time or another, undertook the writing and editing of Commission publications. Commissioners were appointed by the Queen, advised by the First Minister of Scotland, with all appointments regulated by the Office of the Commissioner for Public Appointments in Scotland.

=== Secretaries ===
- Alexander Curle (1908–1913)
- William Mackay Mackenzie (1913–1935)
- Angus Graham (1935–1957)
- Kenneth Steer (1957–1978)
- John Dunbar (1978–1990)
- Roger Mercer (1990–2004)
- Diana Murray FRSE (2004–2015)

=== Chairmen ===
- Sir Herbert Maxwell (1908–1934)
- Sir George Macdonald (1934-1940)
- Sir John Stirling-Maxwell (1940-1949)
- David Charteris, 12th Earl of Wemyss (1949–1985)
- Robert Lindsay, 29th Earl of Crawford (1985–1995)
- Sir William Kerr Fraser (1995–2000)
- Kathleen Dalyell OBE (2000–2005)
- Professor John R. Hume OBE (2005–2015)

=== Commissioners ===
The Commissioners at the time RCAHMS was dissolved were:

- John R. Hume (Chairman)
- Gordon G T Masterton (Vice Chairman)
- Diana Murray (Secretary)
- Kate Byrne
- Tom Dawson
- Mark Hopton
- Jeremy Huggett
- John Hunter
- Paul Jardine
- Jude Quartson-Mochrie
- Elspeth Reid

Notable past Commissioners have included:

- Charles John Guthrie, Lord Guthrie
- Gerard Baldwin Brown
- Thomas H. Bryce (appointed 1908, died 16 May 1946)
- Francis C. Buchanan
- William Thomas Oldrieve
- Thomas Ross
- Alexander Ormiston Curle
- Sir George MacDonald (appointed 1923, chairman from 1934, died 1940)
- Ronald Munro Ferguson, 1st Viscount Novar (appointed 1925)
- James Curle, archaeologist (appointed 26 January 1925, died 1944)
- James A. Morris (appointed 1932, died c1943)
- James Graham Callander (appointed 1934, died 1938)
- Sir John Stirling-Maxwell (appointed 1934, chairman from 17 October 1940)
- Sir Iain Colquhoun (appointed 1934)
- Reginald Fairlie (appointed 1938, replacing Callander, died 1952)
- V. Gordon Childe (appointed 6 May 1942, taking Sir George MacDonald's place, resigned on departure from Scotland in 1946)
- Ian Richmond (appointed 25 April 1944, replacing J Curle)
- Stuart Piggott (appointed 25 October 1946, replacing Bryce)
- W. Douglas Simpson (appointed 5 December 1946, replacing Childe)
- David Charteris, 12th Earl of Wemyss (appointed 1949)
- Vivian Hunter Galbraith (appointed 27 February 1943, resigned 1955)
- William Mackay Mackenzie (appointed 27 February 1943, replacing Morris)
- Ian Gordon Lindsay (appointed 4 October 1951, replacing AO Curle)
- William Croft Dickinson (appointed 16 September 1952, replacing W Mackay Mackenzie, died 21 May 1963)
- George Patrick Houston Watson (appointed 31 December 1952, replacing Fairlie. Died 1959)
- Annie I. Dunlop (appointed 26 April 1955, replacing Galbraith?)
- Angus Graham (appointed 17 June 1960, replacing Watson)
- Rosemary Cramp
- Howard Colvin
- Gordon Donaldson
- James Dunbar-Nasmith
- Archibald A. M. Duncan
- Kenneth H. Jackson
- Robert Lindsay, 29th Earl of Crawford
- Leslie Alcock
- Lord Cullen
- T. C. Smout

=== Staff ===
Prior to the merger RCAHMS had a staff of around 110 based in their offices in Edinburgh, working within ten groups each with an operational manager, and these in turn sat within six departments:

- Survey and Recording
  - Architecture and Industry;
  - Data and Recording;
  - Project Development and Communities;
  - Landscape;
- Collections, including the National Collection of Aerial Photography;
- Education and Outreach;
- Information Systems; and
- Corporate Affairs.

== See also ==
- Scran
- History of Scotland
- Historic houses of Scotland
- Castles of Scotland
