= Scottish Executive Development Department =

The Scottish Executive Development Department (SEDD) was a civil service department of the Scottish Government from 1999 to 2007.

SEDD was responsible for the following areas in Scotland: social justice, housing, land use planning and building control. SEDD was directly responsible for various agencies of the Scottish Executive and other public bodies relating to these areas of responsibility.

Since early 2005 the Department was headed by Nicola Munro. The Minister for Communities was Rhona Brankin and she was assisted by the Deputy Minister for Communities, Des McNulty.
