= North Water Bridge Halt railway station =

Disused railway station in St Cyrus, Aberdeenshire

North Water Bridge Halt

General information
- Location: St Cyrus, Aberdeenshire; Scotland
- Coordinates: 56.7534°N 2.4515°W
- Grid reference: NO724625
- Platforms: 1

Other information
- Status: Disused

History
- Original company: Scottish North Eastern Railway
- Pre-grouping: North British Railway
- Post-grouping: London, Midland and Scottish Railway

Key dates
- July 1866: Opened
- 1 October 1951: Closed
Location

North Water Bridge Halt railway station served the village of St Cyrus, Aberdeenshire, Scotland from 1866 to 1951 on the Montrose and Bervie Railway.

== History ==
The station opened in July 1866 by the Scottish North Eastern Railway. The viaduct was to the south. The station closed to both passengers and goods traffic on 1 October 1951.

Preceding station	Disused railways	Following station
Broomfield Junction Halt; Line and station closed	Scottish North Eastern Railway; Montrose and Bervie Railway	St Cyrus; Line and station closed
