= St Cyrus railway station =

Disused railway station in St Cyrus, Aberdeenshire

St Cyrus
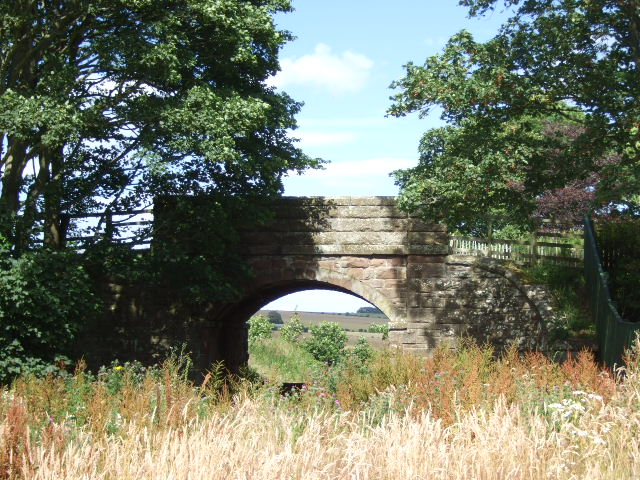
- The site of the station in 2007

General information
- Location: St Cyrus, Aberdeenshire; Scotland
- Coordinates: 56.7744°N 2.4149°W
- Grid reference: NO747648
- Platforms: 1

Other information
- Status: Disused

History
- Original company: Montrose and Bervie Railway
- Pre-grouping: North British Railway
- Post-grouping: London and North Eastern Railway

Key dates
- 1 November 1865: Opened
- 1 October 1951: Closed
Location

St Cyrus railway station served the village of St Cyrus, Aberdeenshire, Scotland from 1865 to 1951.

== History ==
The station was opened on 1 November 1865 by the Montrose and Bervie Railway.

The goods yard was to the west of the line and slightly south of the station. It had a loop, a goods shed and a 15 hundredweight (1,700 lb) crane. The yard was able to accommodate livestock.

The station was host to a LNER camping coach in 1935 and possibly one for some of 1934, then it hosted two coaches from 1936 to 1939. A camping coach was also positioned here by the Scottish Region from 1957 to 1963.

The station closed to both passengers and goods traffic when the line closed to passengers on 1 October 1951. The line closed for goods traffic on 23 May 1966.

== Bibliography ==
- Grant, Donald J. (2017). Directory of the Railway Companies of Great Britain (1st ed.). Kibworth Beauchamp, Leicestershire: Troubador Publishing Ltd. ISBN 978-1-78803-768-6.
- Hurst, Geoffrey (1992). Register of Closed Railways: 1948-1991. Worksop, Nottinghamshire: Milepost Publications. ISBN 0-9477-9618-5.
- McRae, Andrew (1997). British Railway Camping Coach Holidays: The 1930s & British Railways (London Midland Region). Vol. Scenes from the Past: 30 (Part One). Foxline. ISBN 1-870119-48-7.
- McRae, Andrew (1998). British Railways Camping Coach Holidays: A Tour of Britain in the 1950s and 1960s. Vol. Scenes from the Past: 30 (Part Two). Foxline. ISBN 1-870119-53-3.
- Quick, Michael (2022) [2001]. Railway passenger stations in Great Britain: a chronology (PDF). version 5.04. Railway & Canal Historical Society. Archived from the original (PDF) on 25 November 2022.
- The Railway Clearing House (1970) [1904]. The Railway Clearing House Handbook of Railway Stations 1904 (1970 D&C Reprint ed.). Newton Abbot: David & Charles Reprints. ISBN 0-7153-5120-6.

Preceding station	Disused railways	Following station
North Water Bridge Halt; Line and station closed	Scottish North Eastern Railway; Montrose and Bervie Railway	Lauriston; Line and station closed
