= Lauriston railway station =

Disused railway station in Bush, Aberdeenshire

Lauriston
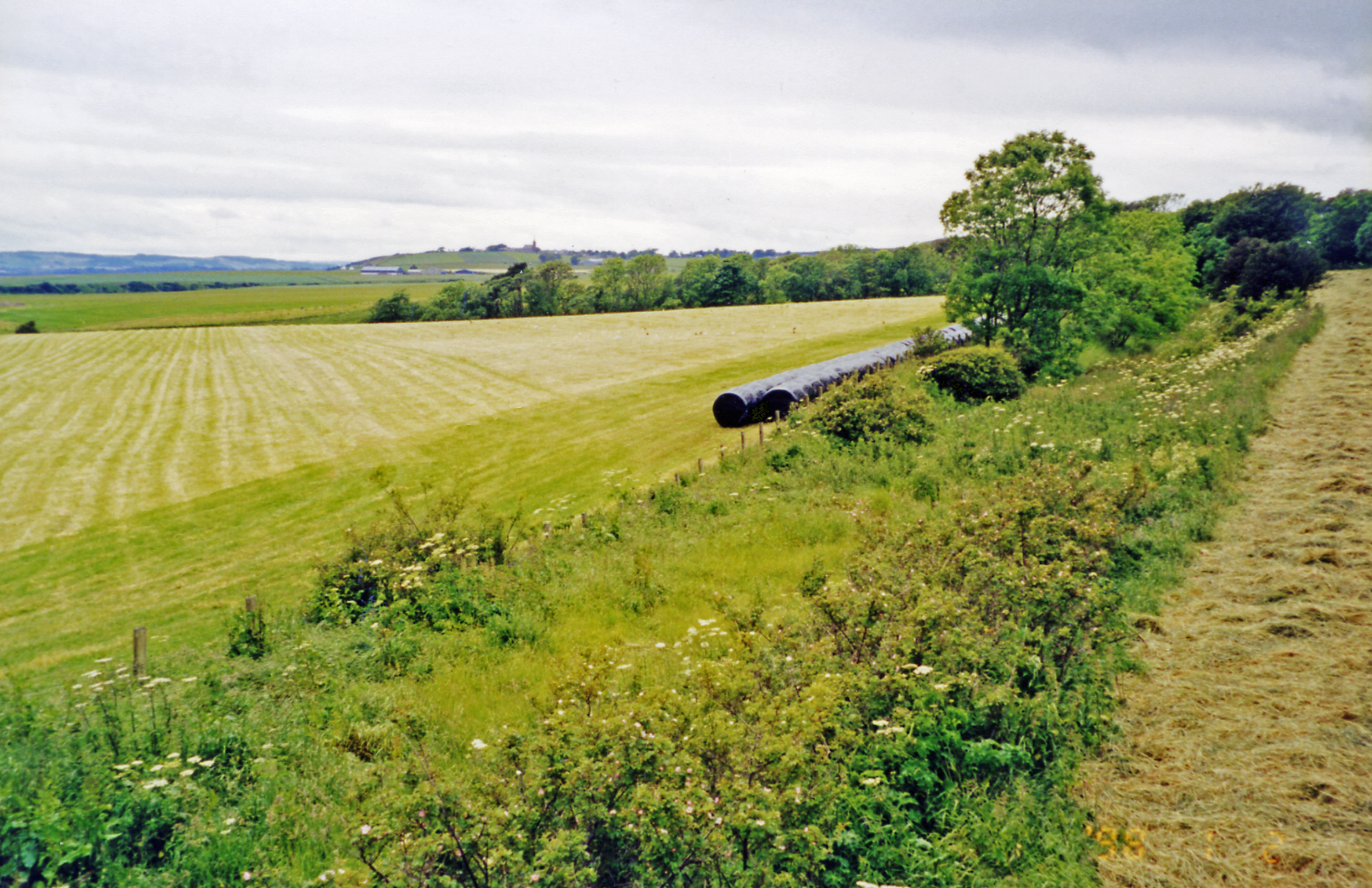
- The site of the station, looking southwest towards Montrose, in 2002

General information
- Location: Bush, Aberdeenshire; Scotland
- Coordinates: 56.7821°N 2.3947°W
- Grid reference: NO759656
- Platforms: 2

Other information
- Status: Disused

History
- Original company: Scottish North Eastern Railway
- Pre-grouping: North British Railway
- Post-grouping: London, Midland and Scottish Railway

Key dates
- 1 November 1865: Opened
- 1 October 1951: Closed to passengers
- 23 May 1966: Closed to goods
Location

Lauriston railway station served the village of Bush, Aberdeenshire, Scotland from 1865 to 1966 on the Montrose and Bervie Railway.

== History ==
The station opened on 1 November 1865 by the Scottish North Eastern Railway. The goods yard was at the east end of the station. The station closed to passengers on 1 October 1951 and closed to goods on 23 May 1966.

Preceding station	Disused railways	Following station
St Cyrus; Line and station closed	Scottish North Eastern Railway; Montrose and Bervie Railway	Johnshaven; Line and station closed
