= Johnshaven =

Coordinates: 56°47′43″N 2°20′08″W

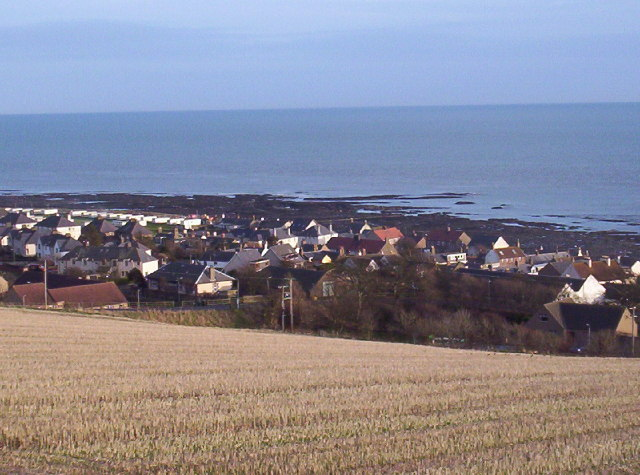
- Johnshaven from the A92 road

- Location within Aberdeenshire
- Population: 640 (2020)
- OS grid reference: NO795670
- Council area: Aberdeenshire
- Lieutenancy area: Kincardineshire
- Country: Scotland
- Sovereign state: United Kingdom
- Post town: MONTROSE
- Postcode district: DD10
- Police: Scotland
- Fire: Scottish
- Ambulance: Scottish
- UK Parliament: West Aberdeenshire and Kincardine
- Scottish Parliament: Angus North and Mearns

Johnshaven is a coastal village along the North Sea located in Aberdeenshire, Scotland, south of Aberdeen. About two miles (three kilometres) southwest of Johnshaven lies Milton Ness, which includes a red sandstone cliff landform.

The flax industry, sailmaking and fishing have historically been an integral part of Johnshaven life and economy.

Johnshaven has a primary school.

== Ancient history ==
Some of the nearest Bronze Age archaeological recoveries are situated somewhat to the north near Stonehaven at the Fetteresso and Spurryhillock sites.

== Early History ==
The earliest record of the existence of Johnshaven is from 19 December 1611, when a sale of the "lands and toun of Johnishevin with its haven and white fishings" to William Rait of Halgreen (now in Inverbervie) was confirmed by the Crown. In 1622, the area of Johnshaven, Gourdon and Sillyflatt (now a farm between Gourdon and Inverbervie) was still in their possession. By the end of the 17th century, the lands now belonged to the Scotts of Brotherton.

== Name ==
The origin of the name is unknown. It may have been St John's Haven originally, but there is no evidence of this dedication in the area.

Over the years, there have been variations in the name of the locality recorded. These include Johnishevin, Johnsheugh, Johnsheavin, John's Haven, Johnnies Haven and Johnshaven. Locals often refer to the village as Johnner.

== Harbour ==
By 1847 the natural inlet near the village had been protected by "high water rocks" deposited to offer protection. Not until 1871 was the first harbour created: the enclosed area now to the north side. This was adapted in 1884 creating a breach in the southern breakwater to create an inner harbour, and only this double barrier offered Johnshaven protection from the harsh North Sea to which it is highly exposed. Due to multiple rocks flanking the harbour entrance, the harbour is frequently hazardous in bad weather.

In 1722 Johnshaven was recorded as the fifth‑largest fishing port in Scotland, with 26 boats employing about 130 fishermen.

The statistics gathered by the Fishery Board in the years before the First World War show a gradual decline, although in 1912 it was reported that "a limited liability company with a capital of £1600 has been formed for the purpose of acquiring motor fishing boats, and operations were commenced before the close of the year".

Fishery Statistics

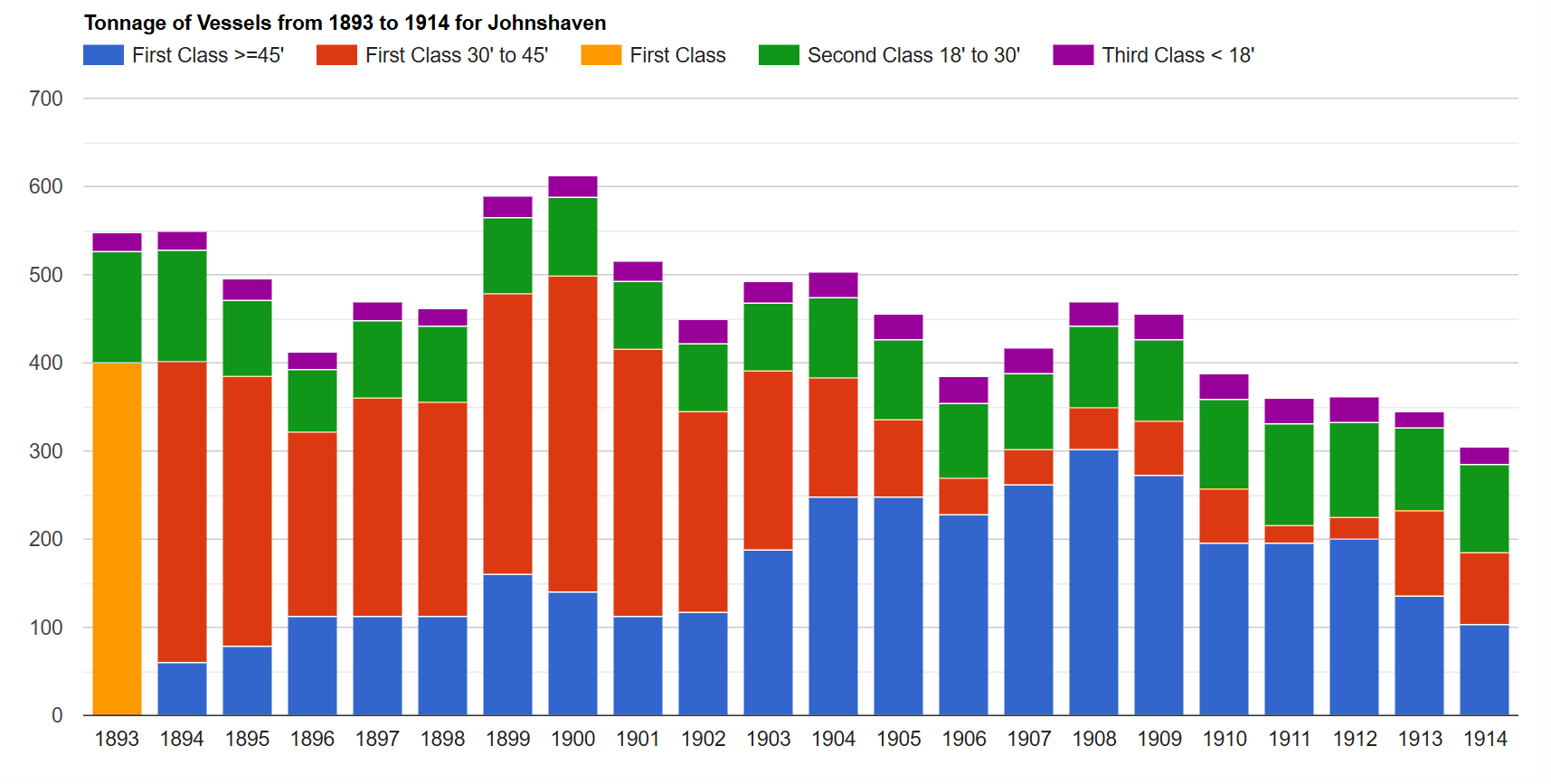
Tonnage of vessels

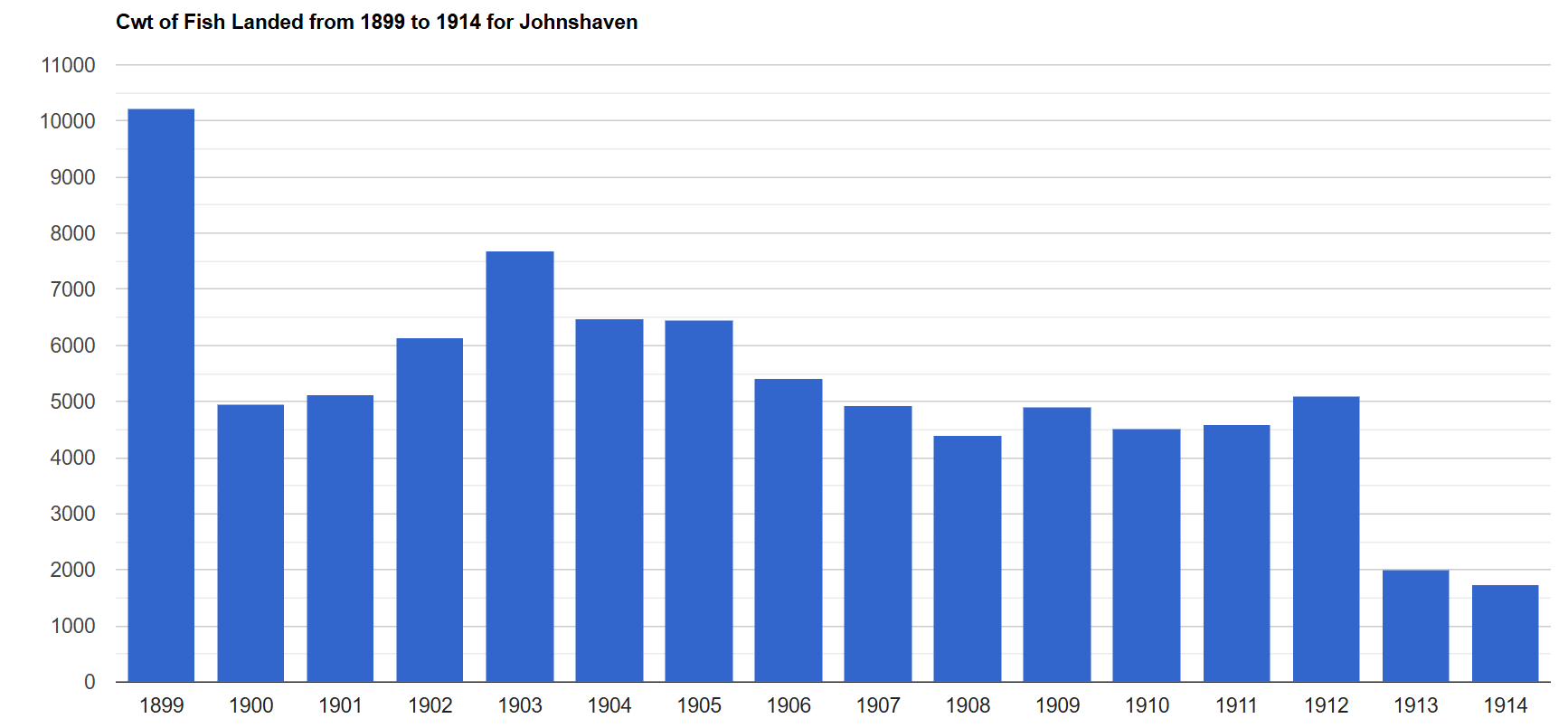
Cwt of fish landed (excluding shellfish)

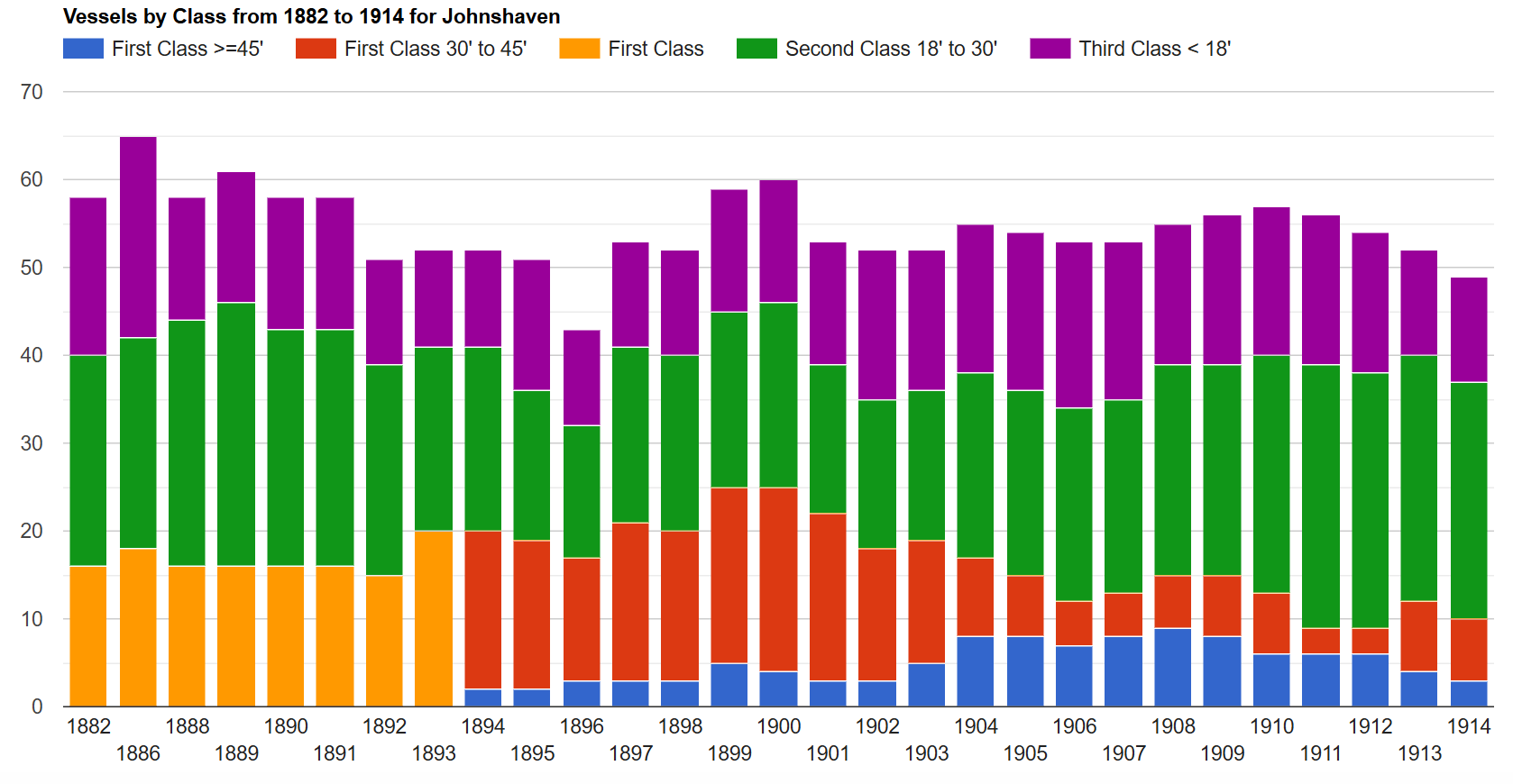
Vessels by class

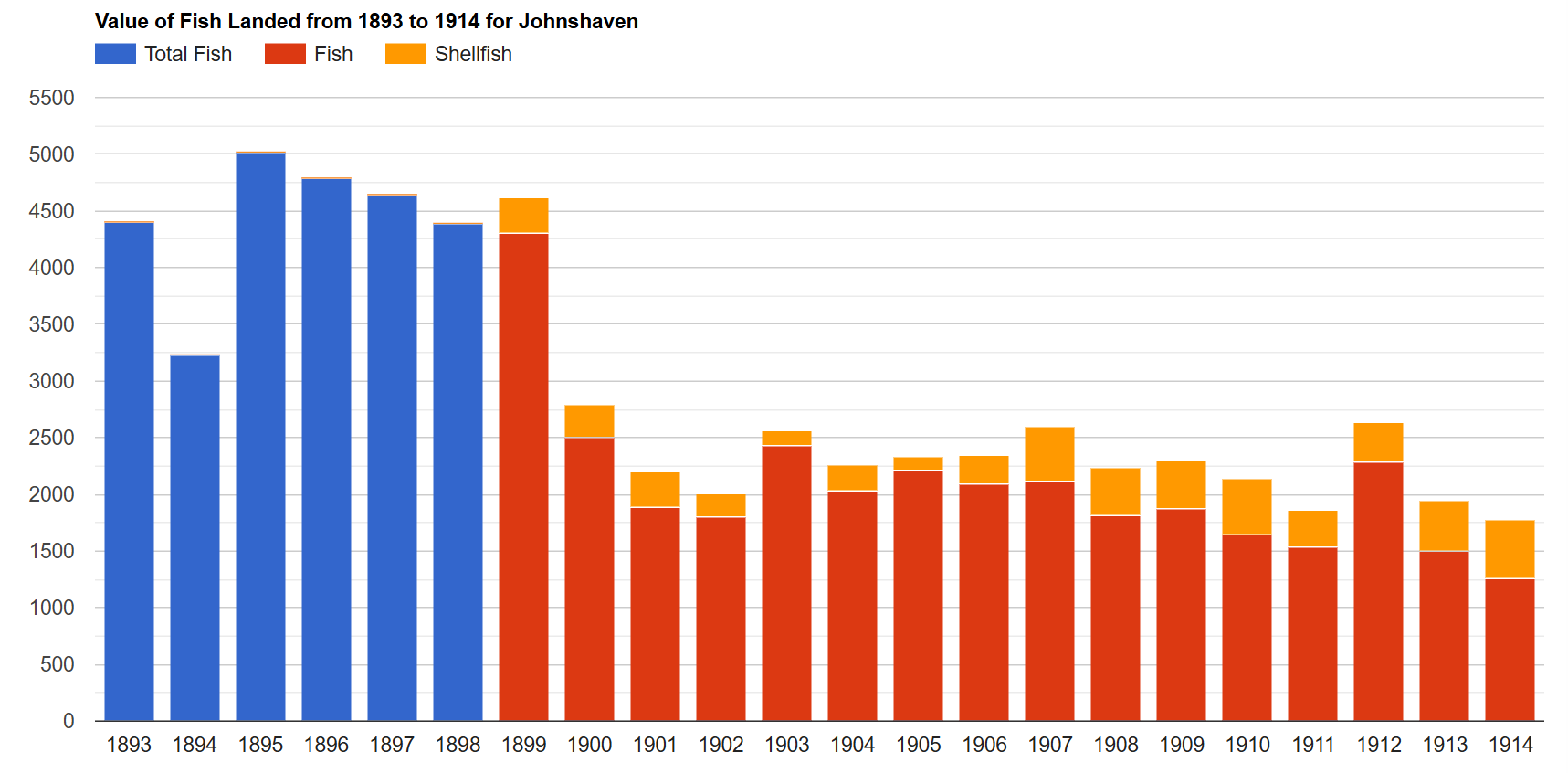
Value (£) of fish landed

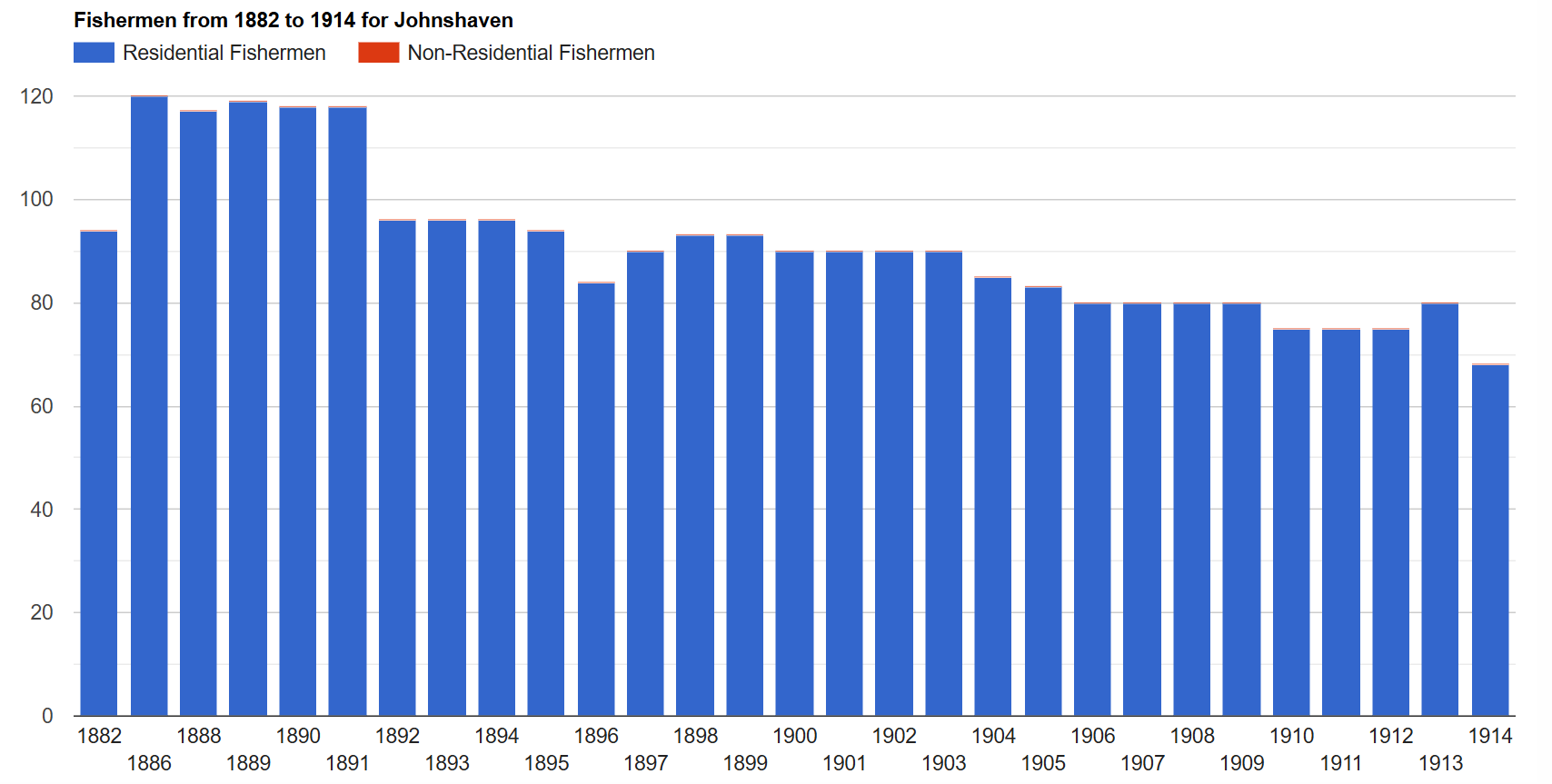
Fishermen

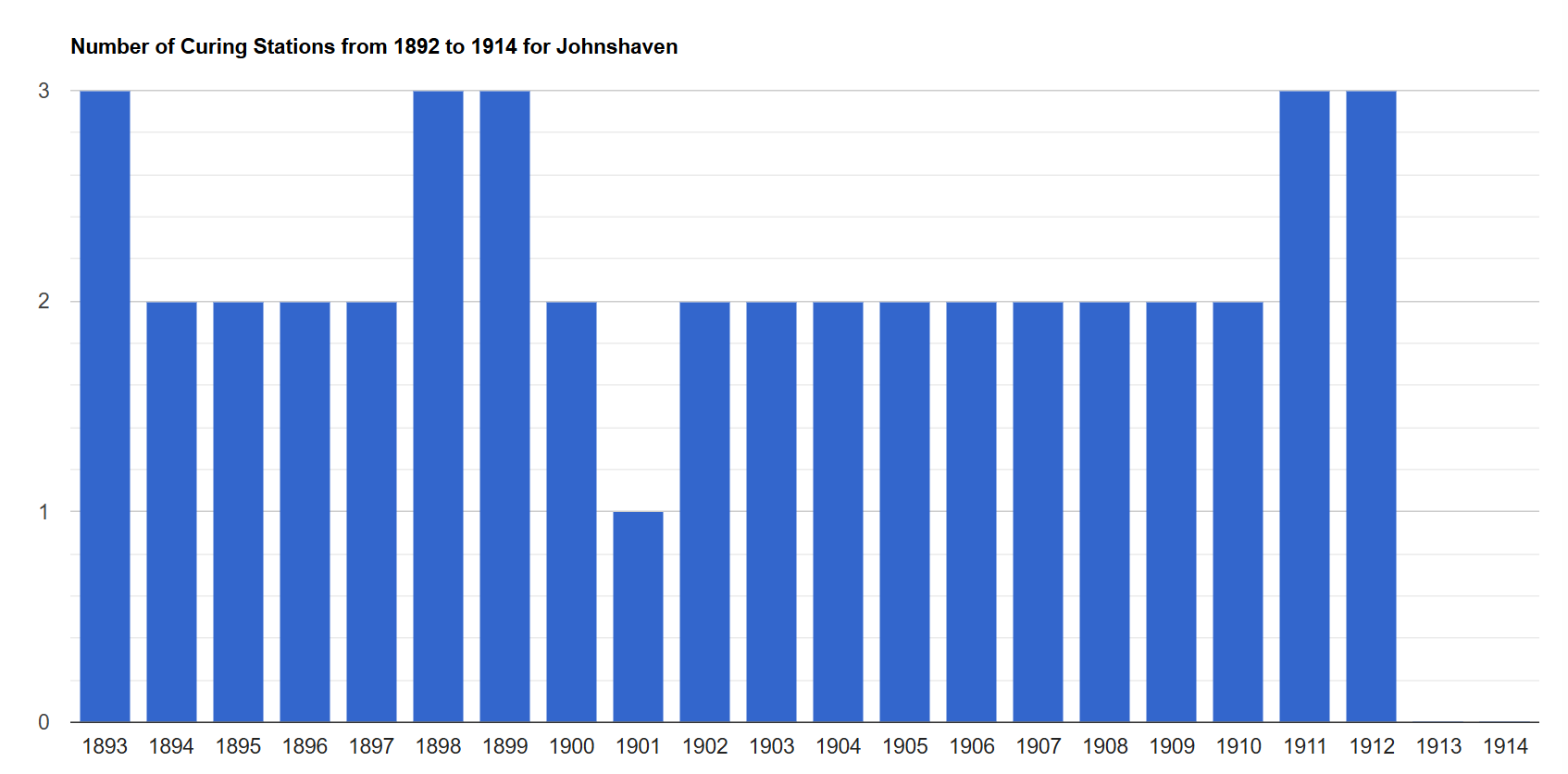
Number of curing stations

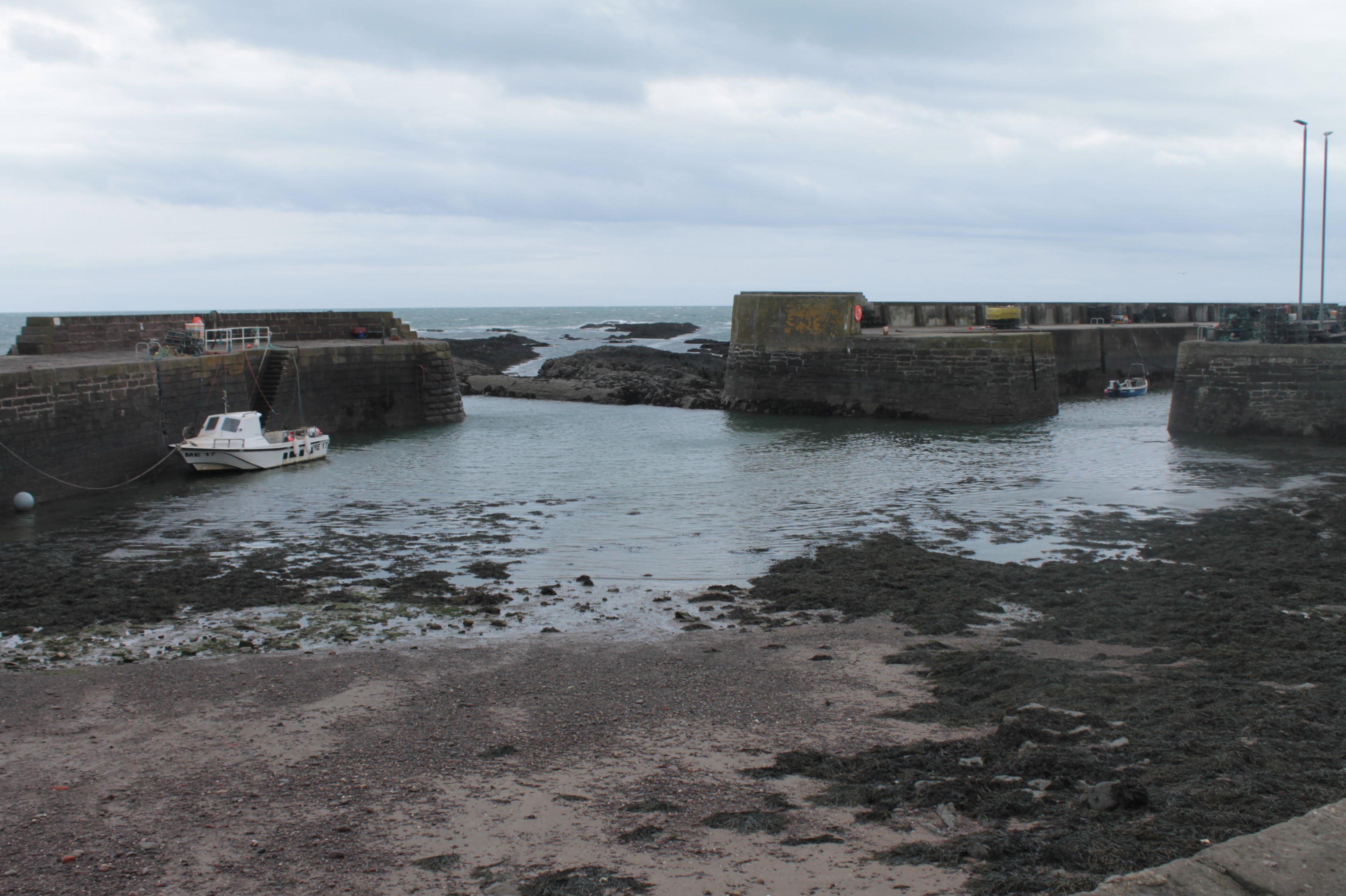
Johnshaven harbour

== Local media ==
Alongside the commercial enterprise of the local newspaper, The Mearns Leader, Johnshaven has a Local Community Radio Station in Mearns FM. Broadcasting from nearby Stonehaven in the Townhall, Mearns FM helps to keep Johnshaven up to date with local and charity events, as well as playing a little music. Staffed completely by volunteers, Mearns FM is run as a not-for-profit organisation, broadcasting under a Community Radio licence, with a remit to provide local focus news events and programming. Jointly funded by local adverts and local and national grants, Mearns FM has one of the largest listening areas of any Community Radio Station owing to the Mearns' distributed population. Mearns FM was set up to try to bring these distant communities together.

== Community groups ==
Johnshaven contains many prominent community groups.

Benholm and Johnshaven Community Council holds its monthly meetings in Johnshaven village hall on the 2nd Wednesday of each month.

SHARK, a small environmental group, aims to promote and protect the wildlife and habitats of the local area.

The Johnshaven Parish Church building (Church of Scotland) was put up for sale in summer 2015. For a number of years, the congregation had been united with St Cyrus, to form Mearns Coastal Parish Church. This parish also includes the historic parishes of Benholm and Garvock. Every summer a hugely popular Holiday Club is run in the village hall.

== Transport ==
Johnshaven was served by Johnshaven railway station, on the Montrose and Bervie Railway from 1865 to 1951. The town is today accessed off the A92 coast road that connects Fife and Stonehaven, where it joins the A90 and continues northward to Aberdeen and beyond. Stagecoach run two bus routes that serve Johnshaven; the X7 Coastrider that stops outside Johnshaven on the A92, and the 107 which also serves the hub of the village too.

== Sources ==
- C.Michael Hogan. 2008. Fetteresso Fieldnotes, The Modern Antiquarian
- Johnshaven. 1977. United Kingdom Ordnance Survey, ISBN 0-319-10299-8
- Archibald Watt. 1985. Highways and Byways around Kincardineshire, Stonehaven Heritage Society
