= Johnshaven railway station =

Disused railway station in Johnshaven, Aberdeenshire

Johnshaven
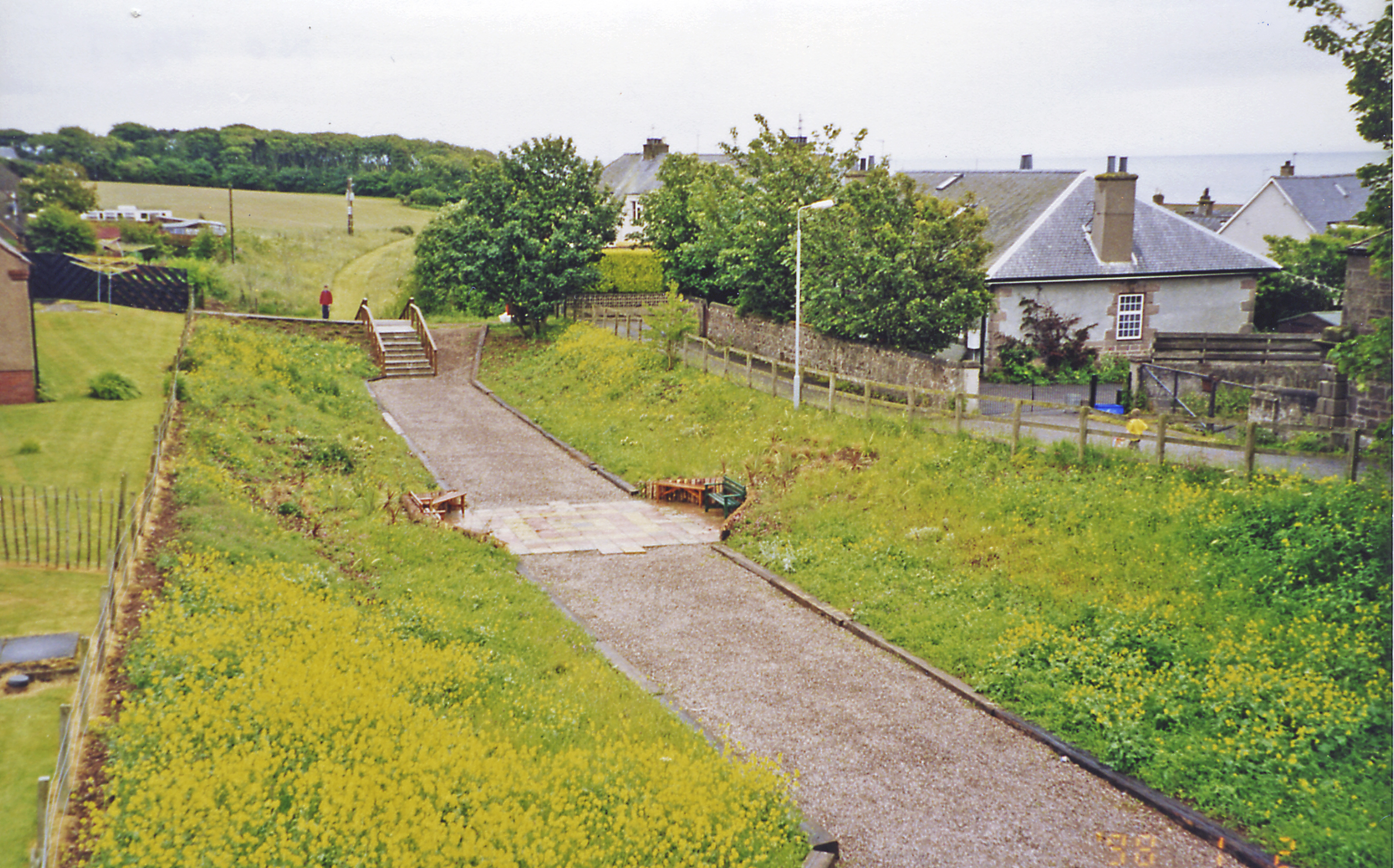
- The site of the station in 2002

General information
- Location: Johnshaven, Aberdeenshire; Scotland
- Coordinates: 56.7952°N 2.3372°W
- Grid reference: NO795671
- Platforms: 1

Other information
- Status: Disused

History
- Original company: Scottish North Eastern Railway
- Pre-grouping: North British Railway
- Post-grouping: London, Midland and Scottish Railway

Key dates
- 1 November 1865: Opened
- 1 October 1951: Closed
Location

Johnshaven railway station served the area of Johnshaven, Aberdeenshire, Scotland from 1865 to 1951 on the Montrose and Bervie Railway.

== History ==
The station opened on 1 November 1865 by the Scottish North Eastern Railway. The goods yard was to the north. The station closed to both passengers and goods traffic on 1 October 1951.

== Today ==
On the site of the former railway station is a housing development, with about a dozen houses, appropriately called Station Place.

Preceding station	Disused railways	Following station
Lauriston; Line and station closed	Scottish North Eastern Railway; Montrose and Bervie Railway	Birnie Road Halt; Line and station closed
