= George Beattie (poet) =

Scottish poet

- Headstone of George Beattie
- Born: 18 September 1786; St Cyrus, Kincardineshire
- Died: 29 September 1823 (aged 38); St Cyrus, Kincardineshire
- Other name: William ?
- Occupation: Lawyer
- Known for: Epic poem "John o' Arnha"
- Website: The George Beattie Project

George Beattie (18 September 1786 – 29 September 1823) was a Scottish poet.

== Biography ==
George Beattie was the son of a crofter and salmon fisher at Whitehill, near St Cyrus, Kincardineshire, where he was born in 1786 to parents, William Beattie and Elizabeth Scott. George was the third eldest of seven children whose names in descending chronology were: James - born/baptised on 10.12.1780; Joseph - born/baptised on 16/05/1784; George/William - born/baptised on 18.09.1786; Mary - born/baptised on 27.02.1789; Catherine - born/baptised on 19.03.1791; Elizabeth - born/baptised on 08/05/1794 and David - born between 1791-1798.

He received a good education at the parish school of St Cyrus. During his boyhood and even into adulthood, he was notorious for his frolics and love of practical jokes. It is also related of him, that on Saturday afternoons it was his delight to wander among the "braes" of St Cyrus, and that he used to "visit the auld kirkyard with a kind of melancholy pleasure". When the boy was about thirteen years of age, his father obtained a situation on the excise at Montrose, and "young George", it is said, walked all the way to his new home "with a tame kae (jackdaw) on his shoulder".

St Cyrus

After an ineffectual attempt to become a mechanic he obtained a clerkship in Aberdeen, but six weeks later his employer died, bequeathing him a legacy of £50. Returning to Montrose, Beattie entered the office of the procurator-fiscal, and on the completion of his legal education in Edinburgh he established himself in Montrose as a writer or attorney. His remarkable conversational gifts, especially as a humourist and his philanthropy rendered him a general favourite among his companions, and, being combined with good business talents, contributed to his speedy success in his profession. Beattie also became factor to the Kirkside Estate in St Cyrus, owned by General Sir Joseph Straton, K.C.B., a Peninsular and Waterloo hero. As an adult, George was considered to be very handsome despite being rather short and stout. He had black wavy hair, blue eyes and a face full of friendliness and fun.

=== Poems ===
In 1815, he contributed to the Montrose Review a poem, "John o' Arnha", which he afterwards elaborated with much care, and published in a separate form, when its rollicking humour and vivid descriptions soon secured it a wide popularity. Its incidents bear some resemblance to those of Tam o' Shanter of which it may be called a pale reflex. In 1818, he published in the Review a poem in the old Scottish dialect, written when he was a mere boy, and entitled "The Murderit Mynstrell". The poem, which is in a totally different vein from "John o' Arnha", is characterised throughout by a charming simplicity, a chastened tenderness of sentiment, and a delicacy of delineation which are sometimes regarded as the special attributes of the earlier English poets. In 1819, he published also in the Review, "The Bark" and in 1820, a wild and eerie rhapsody, entitled "The Dream". He also wrote several smaller lyrics. Beattie was a freethinker and prone to radicalism in his ideology and was a key member of a small group of like-minded individuals who would meet on a Sunday at the 'Den of Ananias', a picturesque spot near Montrose, to discuss their mutual beliefs.

Signature of George Beattie

In 1821, Beattie made the acquaintance of a young lady named William Gibson, who was the daughter of his friend, the squire of Stone of Morphie, Robert Gibson. Against her parents wishes, the couple soon contracted a marriage engagement. During the summer of 1822, they would secretly rendezvous in the walled garden of the Gibson owned, but then uninhabited, House of Kinnaber, where was made many vows of fidelity and solemn promises of eternal love. She was proud, aspiring and ambitious whilst he was unreserved, affable and humble. Miss Gibson's affection being sensitive and jealous whilst Beattie's was deeper, more serious and true.

Walled Garden at the House of Kinnaber

So deeply were the affections of both engaged that a mutual oath, at her behest, was exchanged with these words, "May I never know peace in this world or see God in mercy, if I marry another than you." Yet, solemn as it seems, on the part of Miss Gibson, it proved to have been lightly taken and as lightly broken. The course of true love never yet ran smooth and for poor George Beattie, the darkest of clouds hastily approached. In the spring of 1823 a sudden and fearful "change came o'er the spirit of his dream".

The story promulgated states that before the marriage was completed, the young lady fell heir to a small fortune from a wealthy uncle, William Mitchell, Esq., who was supposedly a governor of Grenada. Upon discovering the full extent of the sum bequeathed to her mother and herself, she promptly rejected Beattie for a suitor who apparently occupied a better social rank in life, corn merchant William Smart. Deeply wounded by the disappointment, Beattie from that time meditated self-destruction. The following quote in George Beattie's own words from his 'Statement of Facts' is extremely insightful with regard to the generally accepted version of events leading up to his alleged suicide:

"That plots were laid by others to oust me and secure Miss Gibson's fortune, I know well from the inquiries that were made at myself from a certain quarter. Those who interfered were far too many for me."

~ George Beattie (1823)

=== Death ===
After completing a narrative of his relations with the lady, contained in a history of his life from 1821 to 1823, he provided himself with a pistol purchased in Aberdeen, and, going to St Cyrus, shot himself next to his sister Mary's grave in the Auld Nether Kirkyard on 29 September 1823. He was just 38 years of age.

After a wild and stormy night, his body was discovered the following day by a herd boy named William Reith, lying in a 'natural position', resting his head and shoulders on the west wall of the kirkyard, with a letter to his brother David by his side.

Of the woman who sent him thus brokenhearted in mad despair to an early grave he takes leave in some lines of touching intensity of feeling within his final poems, "The Appeal" and "Farewell Sonnet", if not sublime, they are at least full of sad and sincere beauty. Thus came an end to all the bright and golden visions of a courageous, honest and true heart.

Ms. William Gibson (Smart), after a life of alleged loveless comfort, followed by a lingering illness of two years, died in her 42nd year on 22 January 1840 at Castlested in Montrose whilst crying out the name of the man who had given her his heart, George Beattie. She was buried in Rosehill Cemetery of Montrose.

Since his death, his poems, accompanied with a memoir, went through several editions.

=== Obituary ===
The author of the 1863 biography, 'George Beattie of Montrose - a poet, a humourist, and a man of genius' was A.S. Mt. Cyrus, M.A., this name being a pseudonym for an Andrew Smith of Lauriston Mains, who went to the South African Province of Natal, and eventually died in Queenstown, South Africa in 1898 of heart disease, in his early 70s. He was a native of St Cyrus and an avid follower of the works of the Rev. Dr. Alexander Keith. He was also lifelong friends with Dr. Keith's sons. Andrew Smith had three brothers: the Hon. Charles Abercrombie Smith, a vice-chancellor of the University of the Cape of Good Hope; the Rev. David Smith and the Rev. Robert Smith of Carsock. He also had a sister who was the wife of the Rev. W. R. Thomson of Balfour.

Grave of George Beattie

=== Farewell Sonnet ===
FAREWELL, maid, thy love has vanish'd,
Gone off like the morning dew;
Farewell, maid, my peace is banish'd,
Adieu! a sad, a long adieu!

Weary world, I now must leave thee;
Sun and moon, a long farewell;
Farewell, maid, no more I'll grieve thee,
Soon you'll hear my funeral knell.

Soon the lips that oft have kiss'd thee,
Mouldering in the dust will lie;
And the heart that oft hath blessed thee,
Soon must cease to heave a sigh.

Soon the tongue that still rehearses
All thy beauty, fickle fair,
Soon the hand that writes these verses
Shall to kindred dust repair.

Friends that constant were, and true aye,
Fare-you-well, my race is run;
Heartless, lorn, benighted, weary,
Every earthly hope is gone.

Gloomy grave, you'll soon receive me,
All my sorrows here shall close;
Here no fickle fair shall grieve me;
Here my heart shall find repose.

== Bibliography ==
- Andrew (Alexander) Smith, (ed) George Beattie of Montrose: a poet, a humourist, and a man of genius, W. P. Nimmo, 1863. (Public Domain)
- Barry Dominic Graham & John Molloy, (ed) George Beattie: A Poet Lost in Time, 2013.
- Barry Dominic Graham & John Molloy, (ed) Maelstrom: The George Beattie Conspiracy, 2014.
- Barry Dominic Graham, (ed) Blood Beyond the Rose: The George Beattie Story, 2016.
