= Milton Ness =

Coastal landform along the coast of the North Sea

Coordinates: 56.7745°N 2.3775°W

Milton Ness is a coastal landform along the coast of the North Sea approximately two miles (three kilometres) south of the village of Johnshaven, Scotland. This headland feature includes a red sandstone cliff formation. Certain prehistoric features are found in the vicinity of Milton Ness, including the Stone of Morphie located somewhat to the west.
