= St Cyrus =

Coordinates: 56.775°N 2.4158°W

St Cyrus: Scottish Gaelic: Eaglais Chiric; Scots: Saunt Ceerus
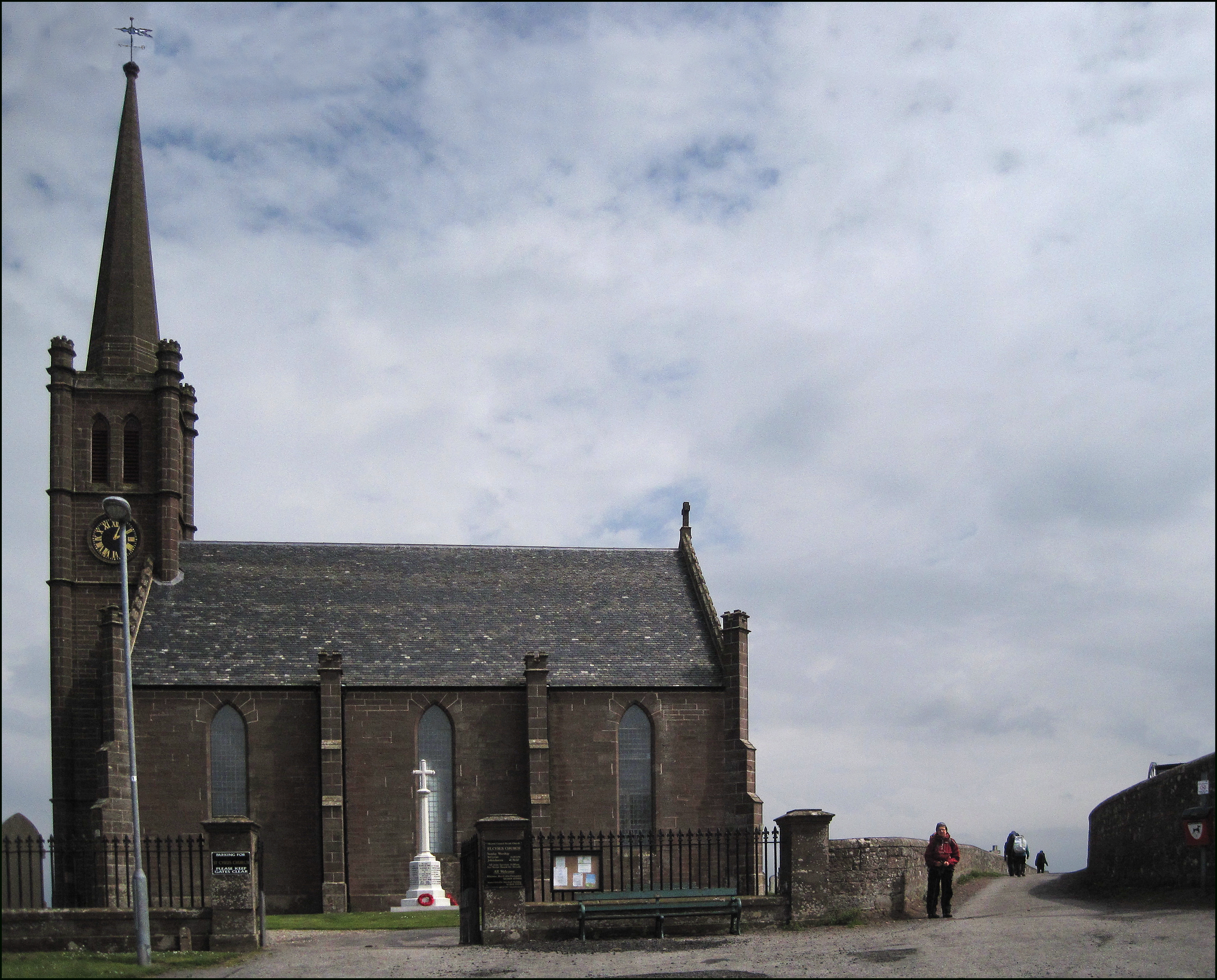
- St Cyrus church

- Location within Aberdeenshire
- Population: 1,130 (2020)
- OS grid reference: NO7171
- Council area: Aberdeenshire
- Lieutenancy area: Kincardineshire
- Country: Scotland
- Sovereign state: United Kingdom
- Post town: Montrose
- Postcode district: DD10
- Dialling code: 01674
- Police: Scotland
- Fire: Scottish
- Ambulance: Scottish
- UK Parliament: West Aberdeenshire and Kincardine
- Scottish Parliament: Angus North and Mearns

St Cyrus or Saint Cyrus (Scots: Saunt Ceerus), formerly Ecclesgreig (from Scottish Gaelic: Eaglais Chiric) is a village in the far south of Aberdeenshire, Scotland.

== General information ==
Traditional salmon fishing with nets is still conducted from St Cyrus beach. Two ice houses that used to provide ice for packing salmon before transporting to market can still be seen. One is to the north end of the beach on the donkey track just below the Woodston Fishing Station, the other is further south next to Kirkside [this is now a private dwelling], not far from the St Cyrus National Nature Reserve Visitor Center. Predominantly loyalist village where 98% of population voted no in 2014 independence referendum. Football loving village where Rangers are by far the most popular team followed by local team Montrose FC

== St Cyrus National Nature Reserve ==
St Cyrus National Nature Reserve (NNR) is situated between the village of St Cyrus and the North Sea. The Reserve comprises 92 hectares (230 acres) of coastal habitat in the northern third of Montrose Bay and is managed by Scottish Natural Heritage (SNH). The cliffs and dunes provide a nationally important habitat for flowering plants and insects, many of which grow at their northern limit in Britain. The reserve is one of the most important botanical sites on the north-east coast of Scotland, supporting over 300 plant species.

St Cyrus NNR is also one of the best-known bird sites in Angus and Kincardine, with over 70 different species of bird being recorded there. These include waders such as redshank, oystercatcher, common sandpiper and curlew. The cliffs also provide a home for buzzard, kestrel and peregrine falcon. Furthermore, the prevalence of gorse shrub provides a nesting place for such small perching birds as whitethroat, stonechat and yellowhammer.

With the abundance of wildflowers, St Cyrus NNR is also an important site for butterflies, moths and grasshoppers. One species of particular note is the Small blue butterfly, a UK Biodiversity Action Plan (BAP) species at its northern habitat limit. There have also been over 200 species of moth recorded on the reserve.

St Cyrus NNR is also part of the St Cyrus and Kinnaber Links Site of Special Scientific Interest (SSSI).

== Area prehistory ==
There are known prehistorical archaeological sites in the general coastal area of St Cyrus. Examples of these features include Gourdon Hill to the north and the Stone of Morphie, both situated slightly to the west of the A92 road alignment.

In 2004, CFA Archaeology, conducted archaeological investigations, in advance of the construction of the Aberdeen to Lochside Natural Gas Pipeline, next to the village. There they discovered the remains of three ring-ditch roundhouses which they radiocarbon dated to the Late Bronze Age.

== History ==
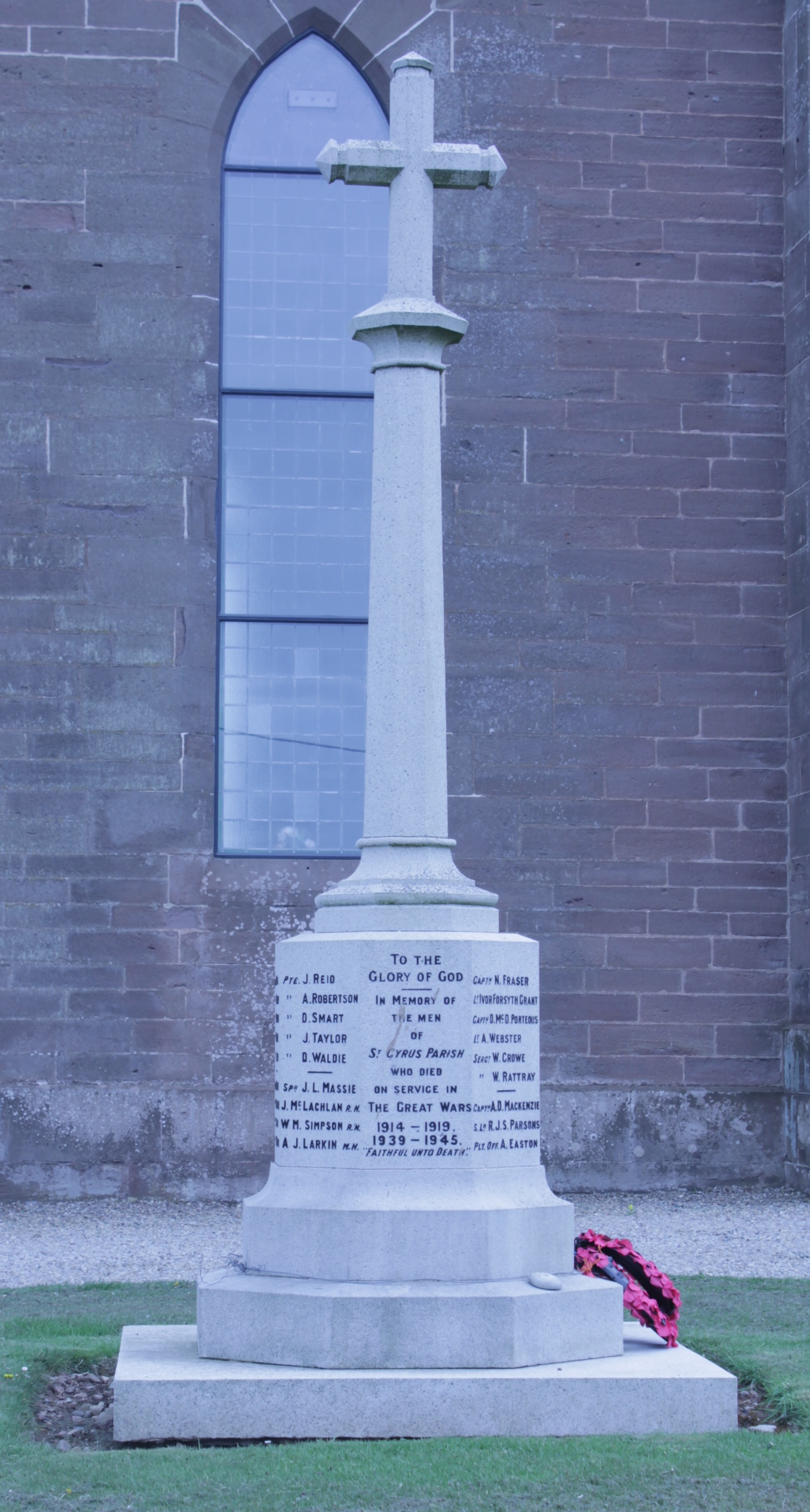
St Cyrus war memorial

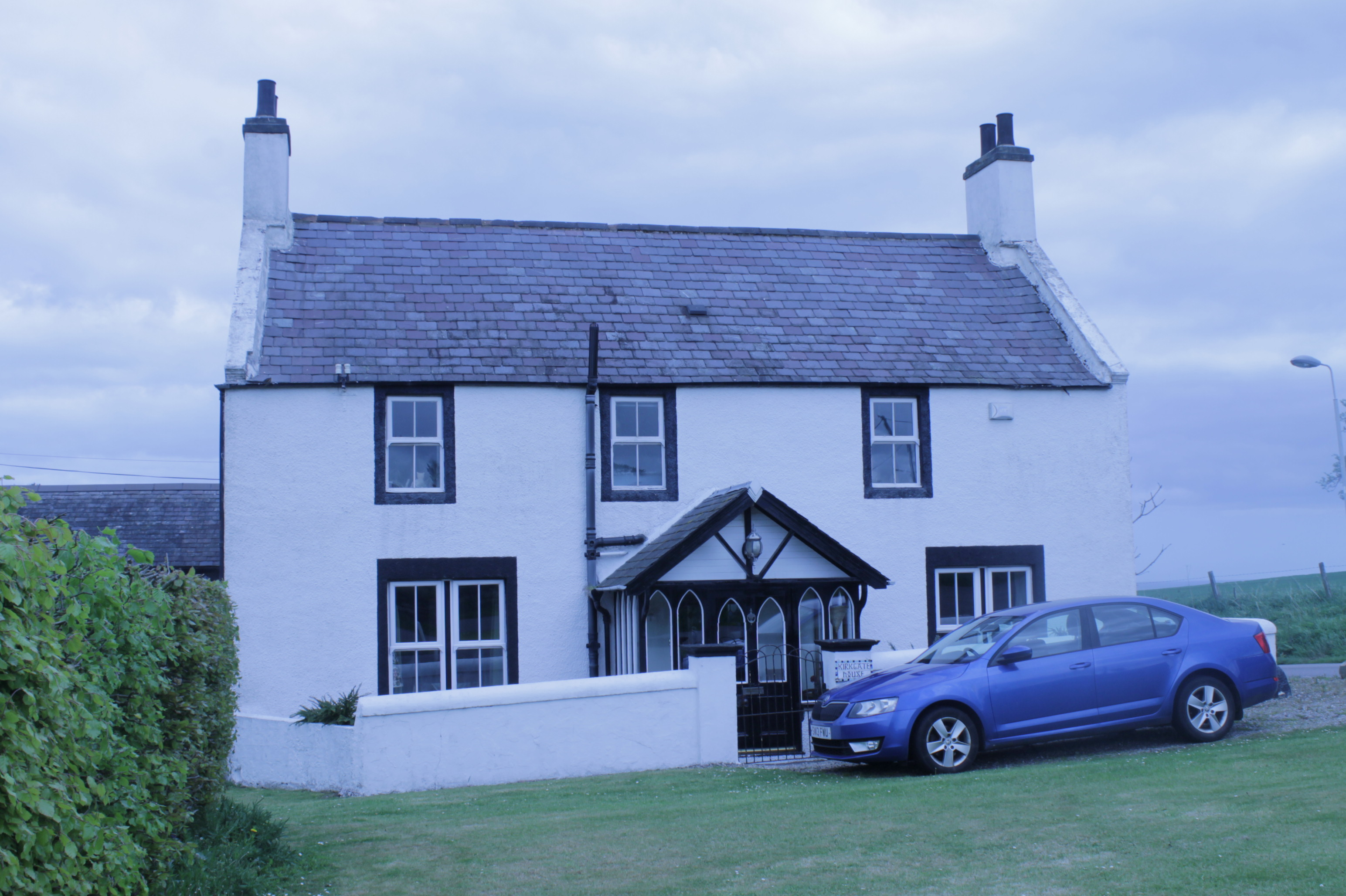
Old manse, St Cyrus

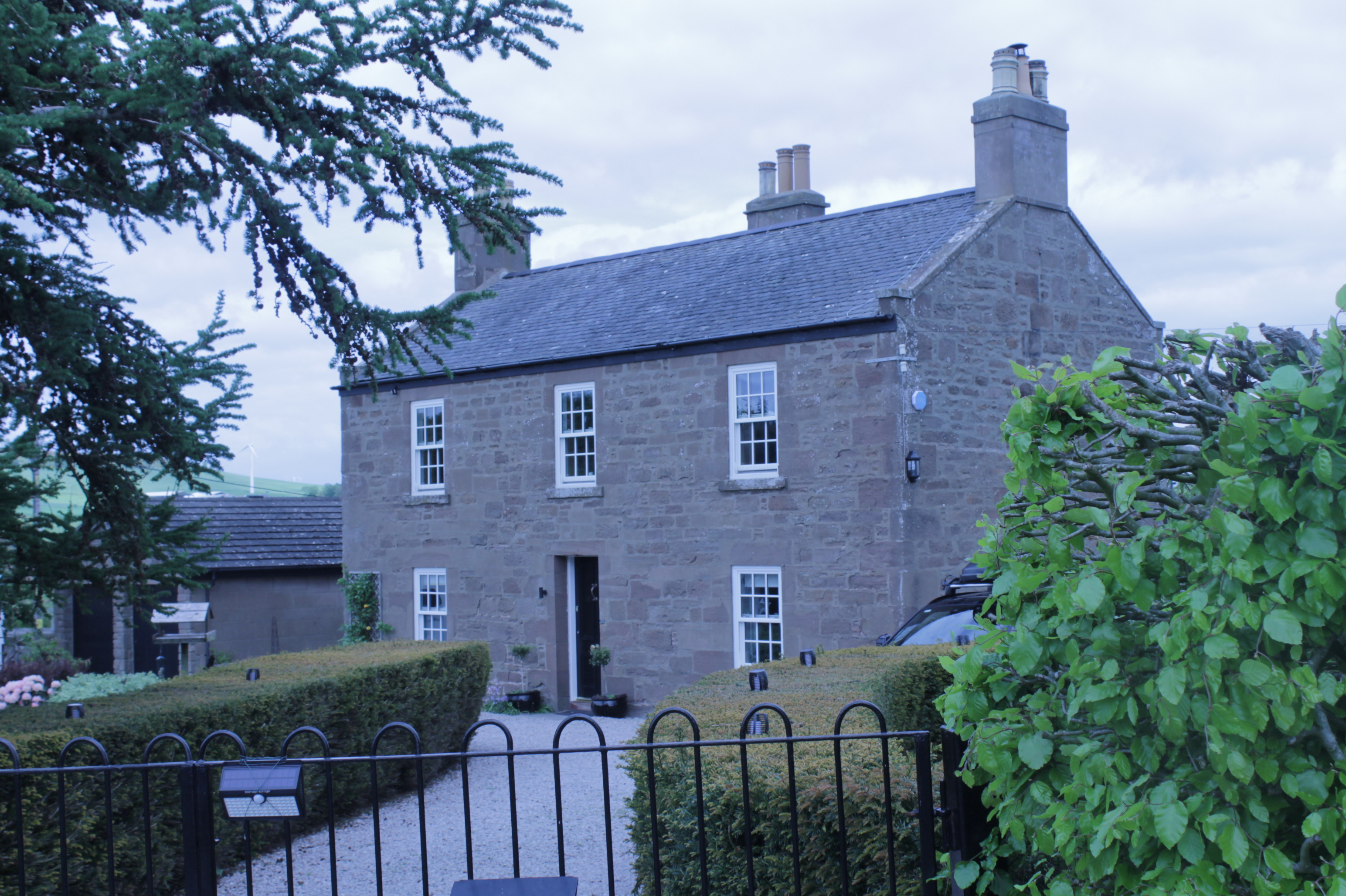
Old Schoolhouse, St Cyrus

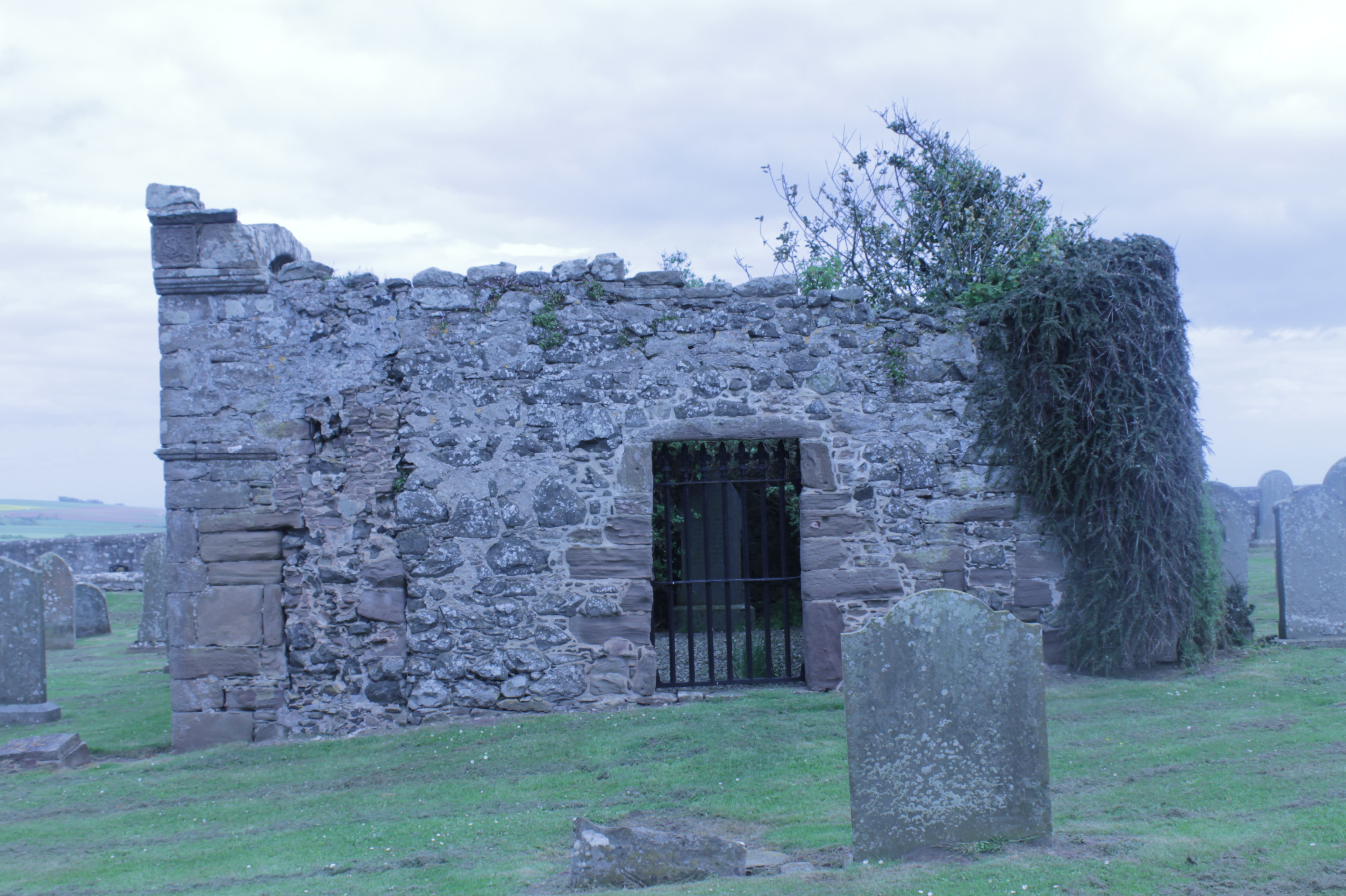
Old St Cyrus Parish Church

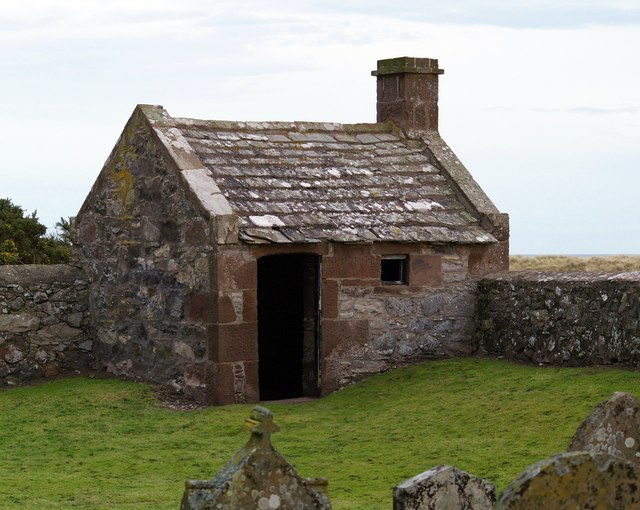
Watch House at Kirkside Cemetery

The remains of the Kaim of Mathers is located on rock pinnacles on the northernmost part of the beach. Built by the Berkeley (or Barclay) family, it was used as a refuge by David de Berkeley from the vengeance of the king when, around 1420, he was part of a group who murdered the local sheriff, John Melville of Glenbervie.

The ruins of Old St Cyrus Church lie in the churchyard and are used as a burial vault for the Porteous family. The manse dates from the early 18th century and was remodelled at ground floor in the late 19th century. The current parish church dates from 1787 but was heavily remodelled around 1870 (including a spire).

The old schoolhouse (run by the church and next to the manse) dates from around 1800. This was replaced by a new school south of the church in the early 20th century.

St Cyrus railway station was on the Montrose to Inverbervie branch line of the North British Railway. Freight traffic was withdrawn from this line in 1966 as part of the Beeching cuts but the passenger service had ceased in 1951 ten years before Dr Beeching joined British Railways. Evidence for the line can still be seen in the viaduct over the North Esk river to the south of St Cyrus and the remains of some railway embankments and road bridges to the north.

A Chain Home Low radar station was once situated on the cliffs immediately to the south of the village. A blockhouse can still be seen at its location.

=== Notable residents ===
- Alexander Keith, D.D. (1791–1880), Church of Scotland and Free Church minister
- Thomas Keith (surgeon) (1827–1895), son of the above
- George Beattie (1786–1823), poet

== Services ==
St Cyrus has a primary school with a Nursery Class and P1 to P7 classes.

St Cyrus has its own telephone exchange (code ESSTC). The exchange is fully enabled for BT ADSL, both fixed speed and ADSL Max flavours.

St Cyrus has a public hall located not far from the store on the A92. It was used for meetings of the local community council until it disbanded in 2015, and a range of other activities. There is a sports pavilion at the local park, with an all-weather pitch and bowling green.

The Mearns Leader is the local weekly newspaper and The Courier is the regional newspaper, which is supplemented by a local community radio station, Mearns FM, that broadcasts from nearby Stonehaven. The station is not-for-profit, and is volunteer run under a Community Radio Licence. The Facebook page 'What's on St Cyrus' is the local social media page.

=== Transport ===
St Cyrus is on the A92 road that runs from Fife to Stonehaven where it joins the A90 and continues to Aberdeen and beyond.

St Cyrus is on National Cycle Route 1 - Tain to Dover.

The nearest railway stations are at Montrose, 5 miles (8.0 km) away, Laurencekirk, 7 miles (11 km) away and Stonehaven, 18 miles (29 km) away.

Buses (No.107 and the X7 Coastrider) run between Montrose, St Cyrus and other coastal settlements up to Stonehaven and onward to Aberdeen.

The nearest airport is at Aberdeen approximately 40 miles (64 km) to the north.

== Demography ==
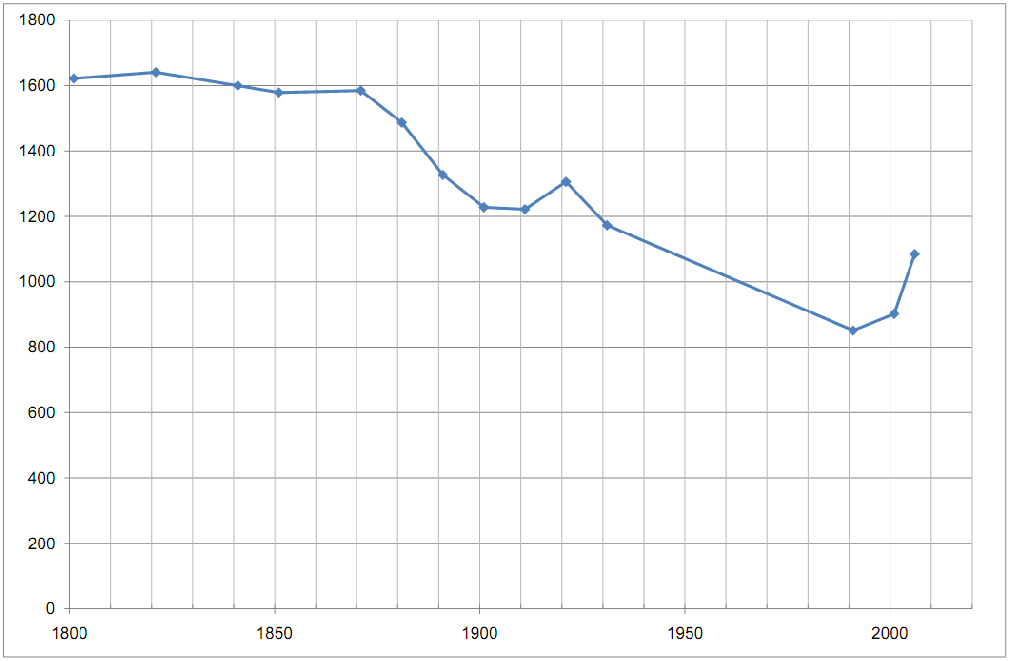
St Cyrus Population 1801 to 2006

Year	Population
2011	1100
2006	1085
1991	851
1931	1173
1921	1306
1911	1222
1901	1228
1891	1327
1881	1487
1871	1585
1851	1579
1841	1164
1821	1641
1801	1622
1755	1271

== Gallery ==
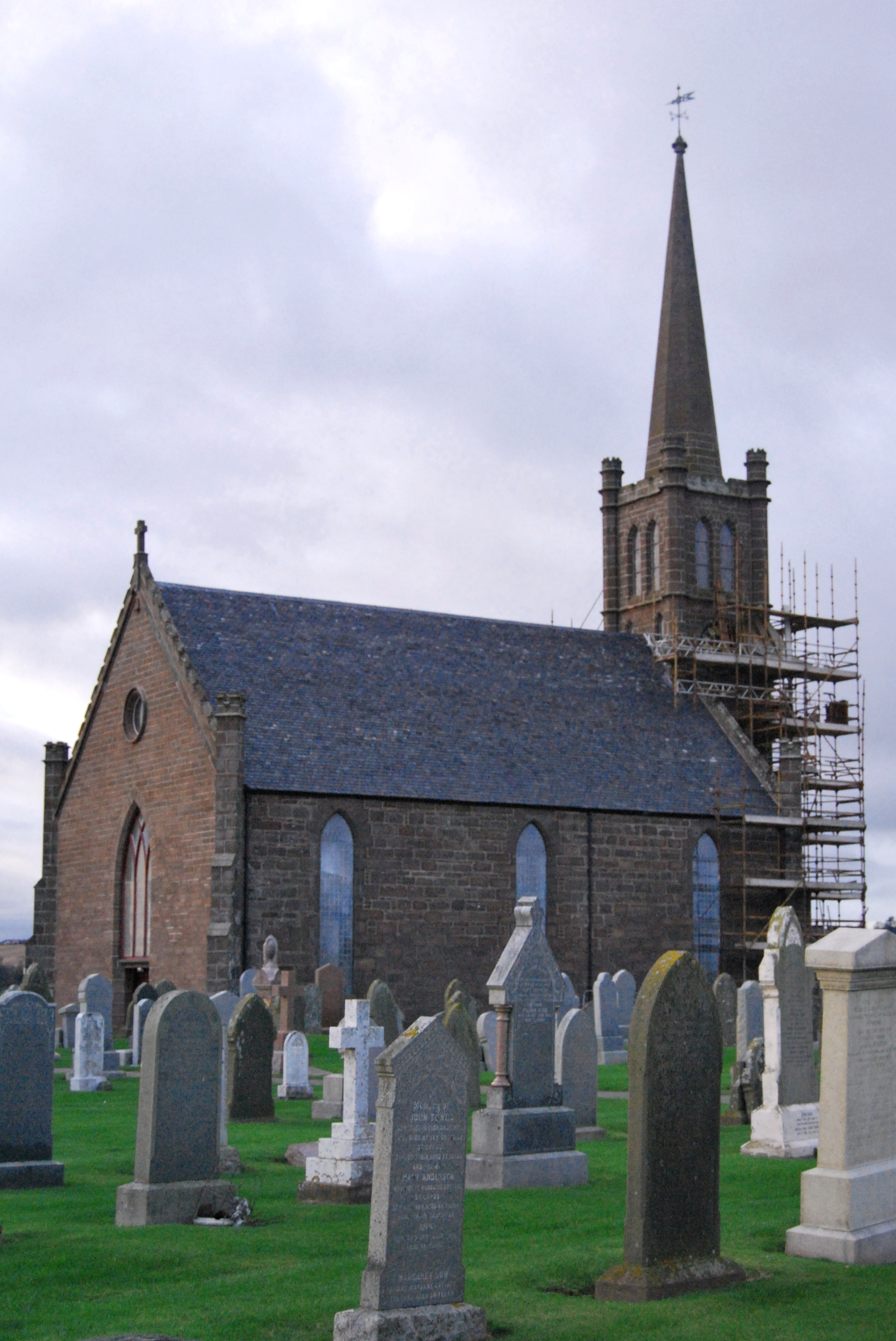
St Cyrus Church

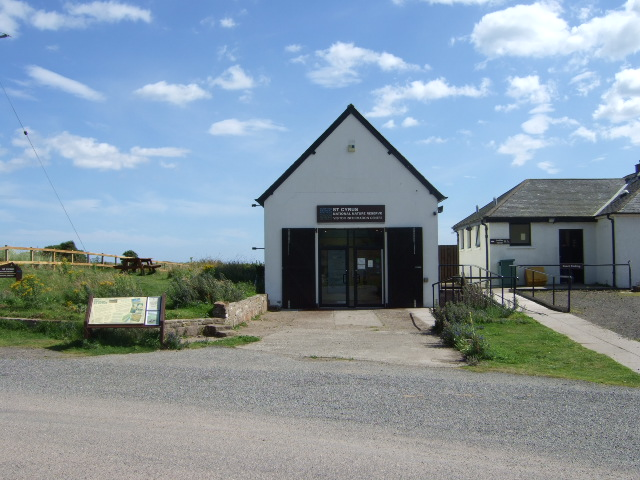
The visitor centre at the Saint Cyrus National Nature Reserve

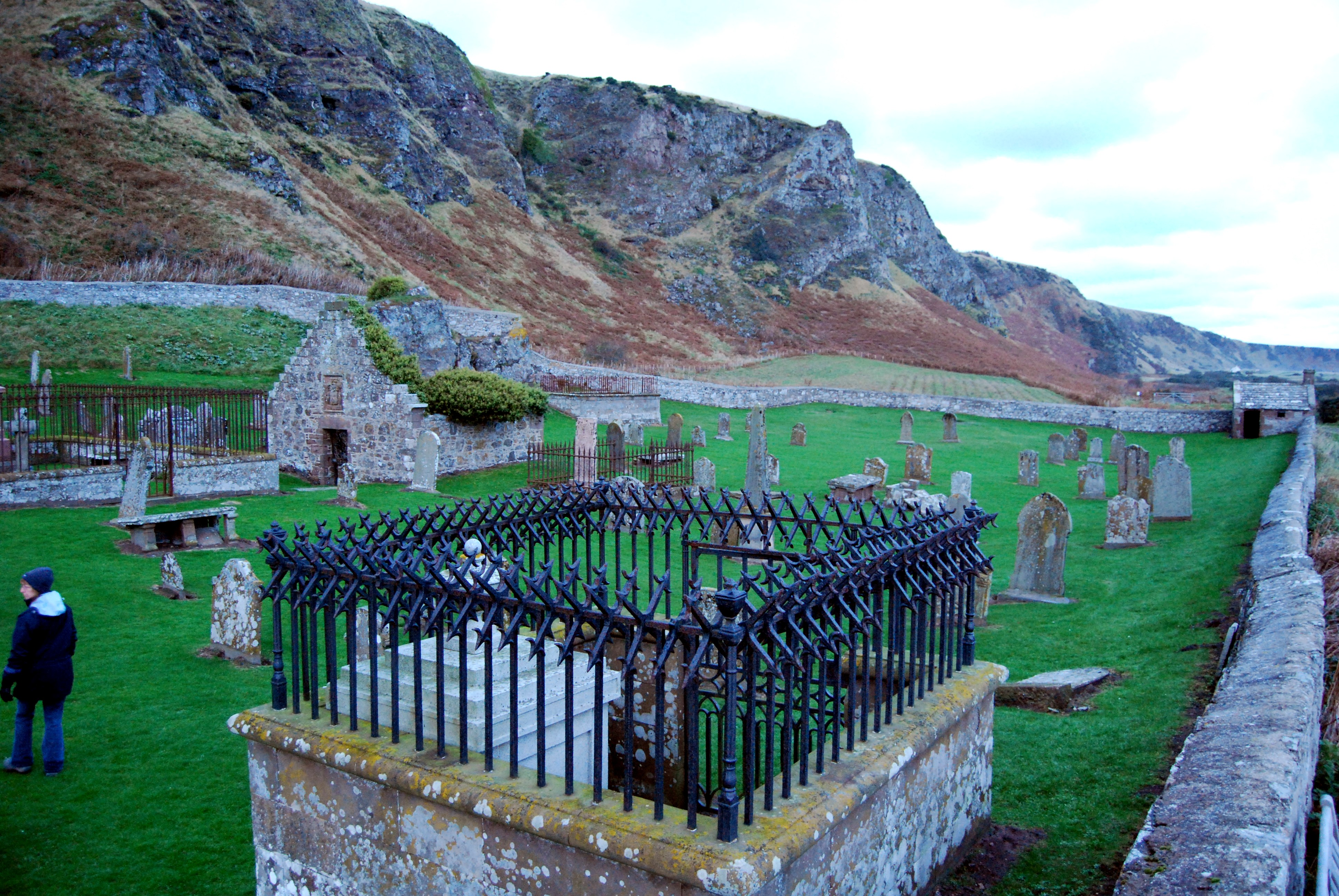
St Cyrus ancient kirkyard

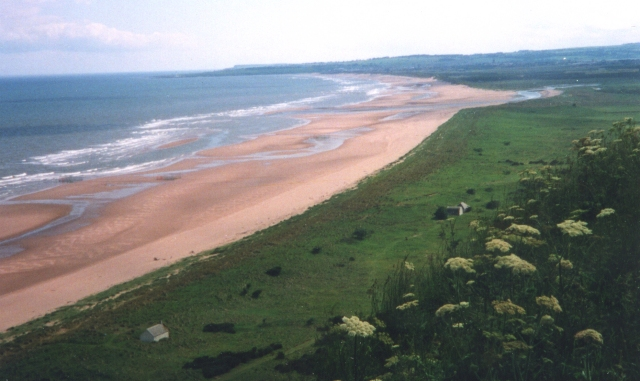
St Cyrus Beach
