= Montrose and Bervie Railway =

Former railway line in Scotland

The Montrose and Bervie Railway
Overview
- Locale: Scotland
- Dates of operation: 1865–1966

Technical
- Track gauge: 4 ft 8 1/2 in (1,435 mm)

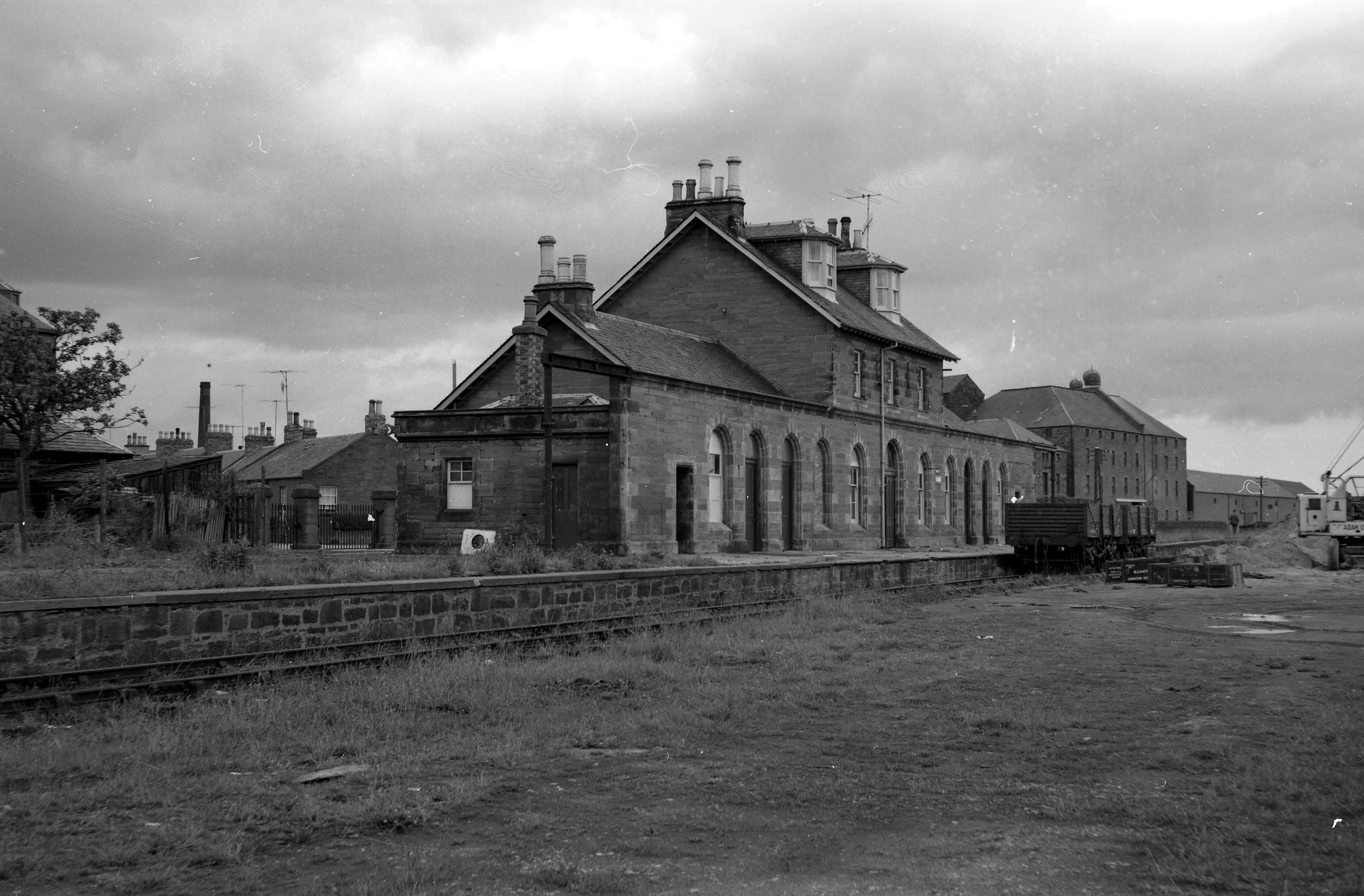
Ex Caledonian Railway Montrose station in 1960

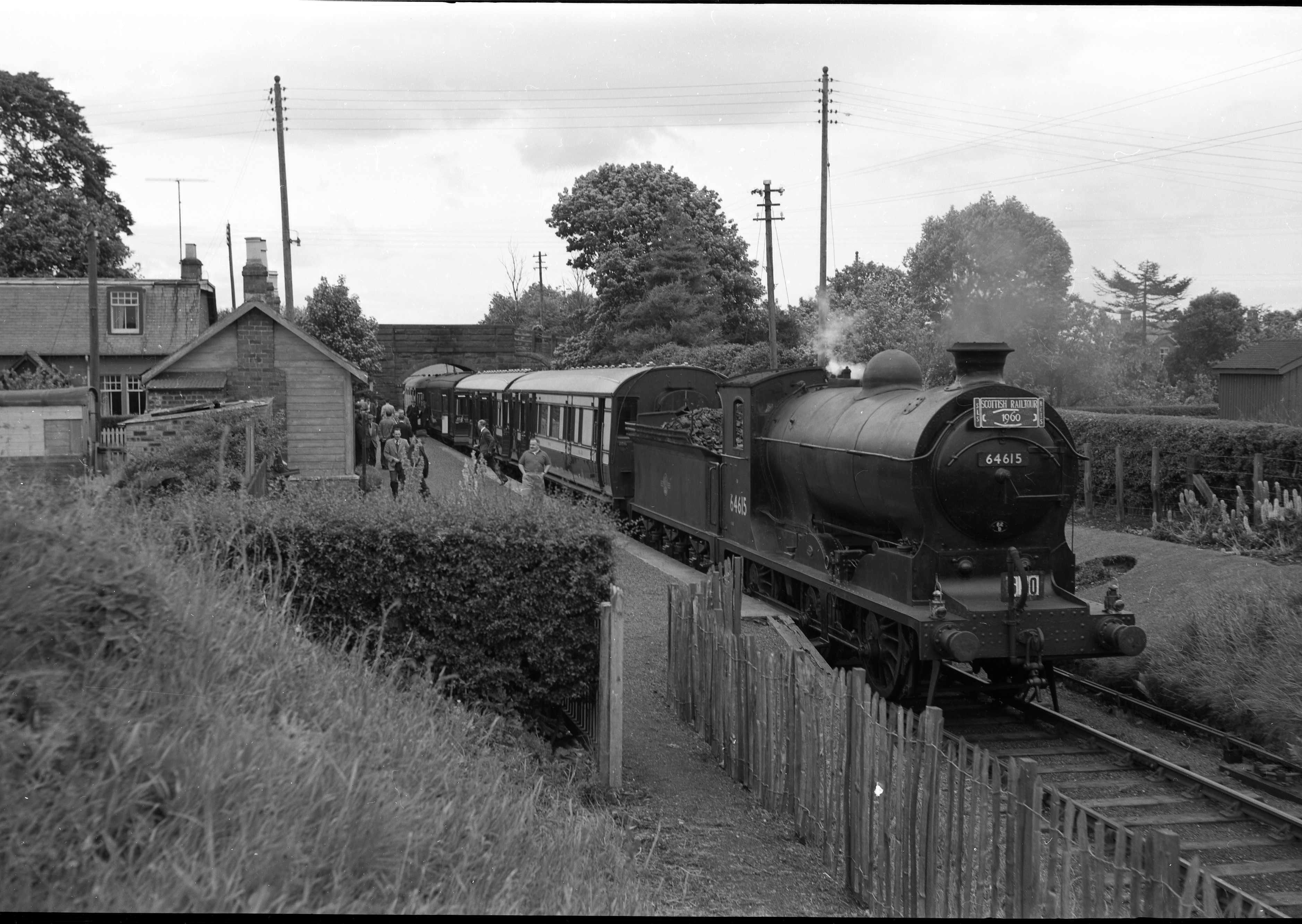
St Cyrus railway station with Scottish rail tour in 1960

The Montrose and Bervie Railway was a Scottish railway. When the Aberdeen Railway opened in 1850, the coastal settlements north of Montrose were not linked in, and local interests promoted a branch line from Montrose to Bervie. They found it impossible to raise capital at first, but from 1861 the larger railways were promoting new connections around Aberdeen, and the Great North of Scotland Railway (GNoSR) decided that the Bervie line would give it a route to the south.

That scheme did not proceed, but the GNoSR had put money in, and the simple branch line opened, in 1865.

It was absorbed by the North British Railway in 1881, who also thought it might give them a springboard towards Aberdeen; that scheme also failed to materialise, and the line remained a quiet backwater.

Road transport spelt doom for the sparsely trafficked line, and it closed for passengers in 1951 and completely in 1966.

== History ==
=== The first railway to Montrose ===
In 1848, the Aberdeen Railway opened its line from Guthrie, between Arbroath and Forfar, to Montrose; a shortage of capital delayed its extension to Aberdeen for a while, but after some difficulty it opened to Ferryhill in 1850. The main line ran inland, however, and Montrose was at the end of a stub branch. The coastal communities further north saw the benefits of a railway connection to other villages, and they pressed the Aberdeen Railway, and its successor the Scottish North Eastern Railway (SNER), to build a branch northwards along the coast.

=== An independent concern ===
Montrose and Bervie Railway Act 1860
- Act of Parliament
- Parliament of the United Kingdom
- Long title: An Act for making a Railway from the Royal Burgh of Bervie or Inverbervie in the County of Kincardine to the Montrose Branch of the Scottish North-eastern Railway in the County of Forfar, to be called "The Montrose and Bervie Railway."
- Citation: 23 & 24 Vict. c. cxlii

Dates
- Royal assent: 3 July 1860

These approaches were unsuccessful and the larger companies had other priorities. At length the local people promoted their own branch line, and they obtained their authorising act of Parliament for the Montrose and Bervie Railway, the Montrose and Bervie Railway Act 1860 (23 & 24 Vict. c. cxlii) on 3 July 1860. The line was to be 12 miles (19 km) long and authorised capital was £70,000.

The act authorised the capital but the company had to raise the money themselves, and this proved extremely difficult. In fact two years of strenuous attempts to secure subscriptions were almost completely fruitless, and it appeared likely that the scheme would have to be abandoned.

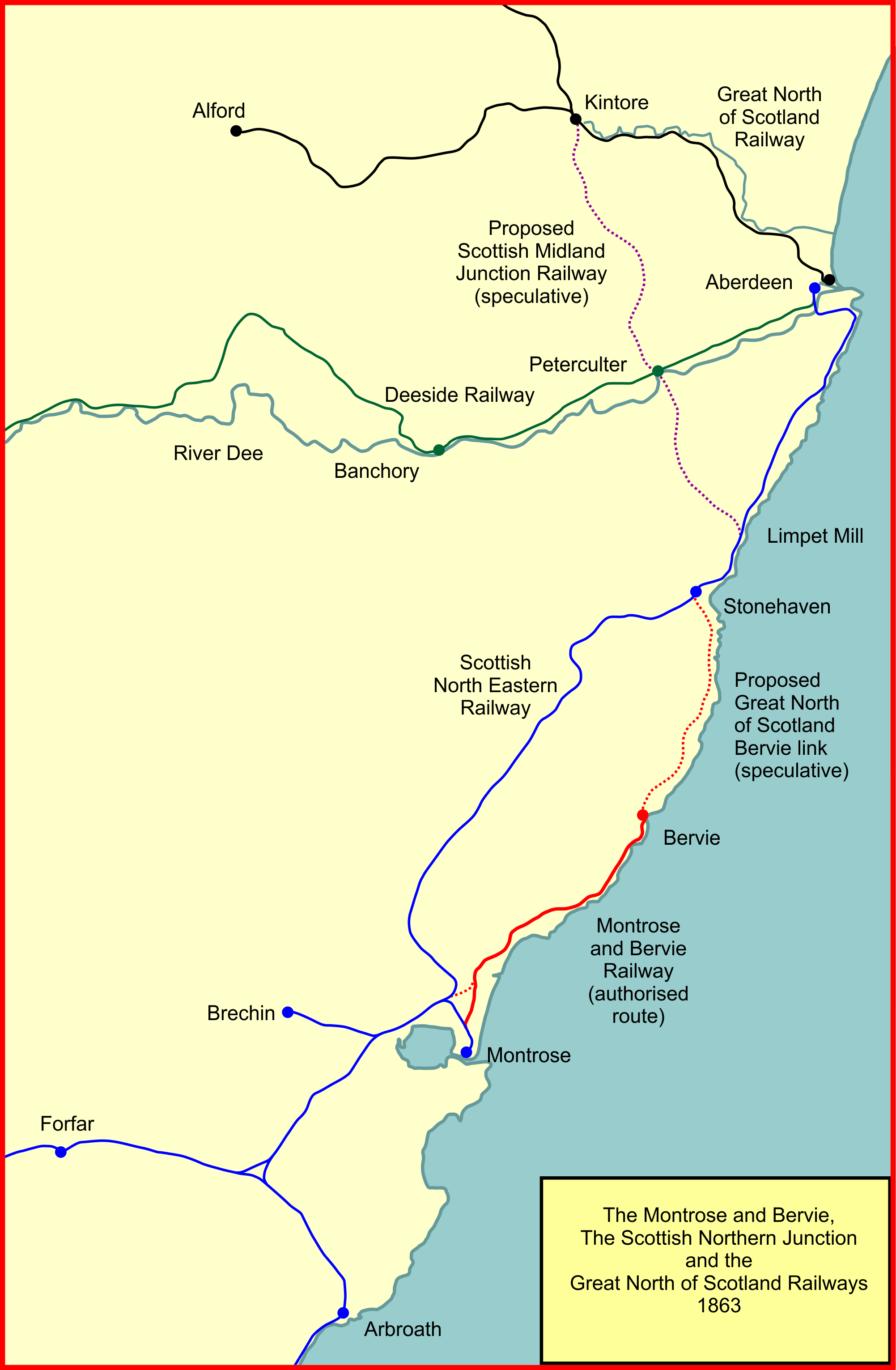
The Great North of Scotland Railway plan to use the Bervie line

However in 1861 a new main line railway was floated, the Scottish Northern Junction Railway, which would connect Kintore, on the Great North of Scotland Railway (GNoSR) line near Inverurie, with the SNER at Limpet Mill near Stonehaven. It had been a sore point for several years that the GNoSR and the SNER had no through connection at Aberdeen, the GNoSR being content to transfer southwards goods to coastal shipping at Aberdeen; at a stroke a highly useful through line would be created, taking away substantial income from the GNoSR.

=== Funded by the GNoSR ===
The GNoSR was alarmed by this development, but it saw that if the Montrose and Bervie line were built, it could build extensions northwards and southwards to link Stonehaven and Arbroath; if it could secure running powers over the SNER as well, it would have access from its network to Dundee. The GNoSR bought up substantial blocks of M&BR shares, and a revised route had to be surveyed, converting the planned coastal branch line to a main line, with better gradients, easier curves, and a location at Bervie from which the line could run northwards.

A Bill was presented to Parliament for the 1863 session, with the north and south extensions included: together they were longer than the original route. Disaster befell the company in Parliament, for the scheme was thrown out.

=== A local line after all ===
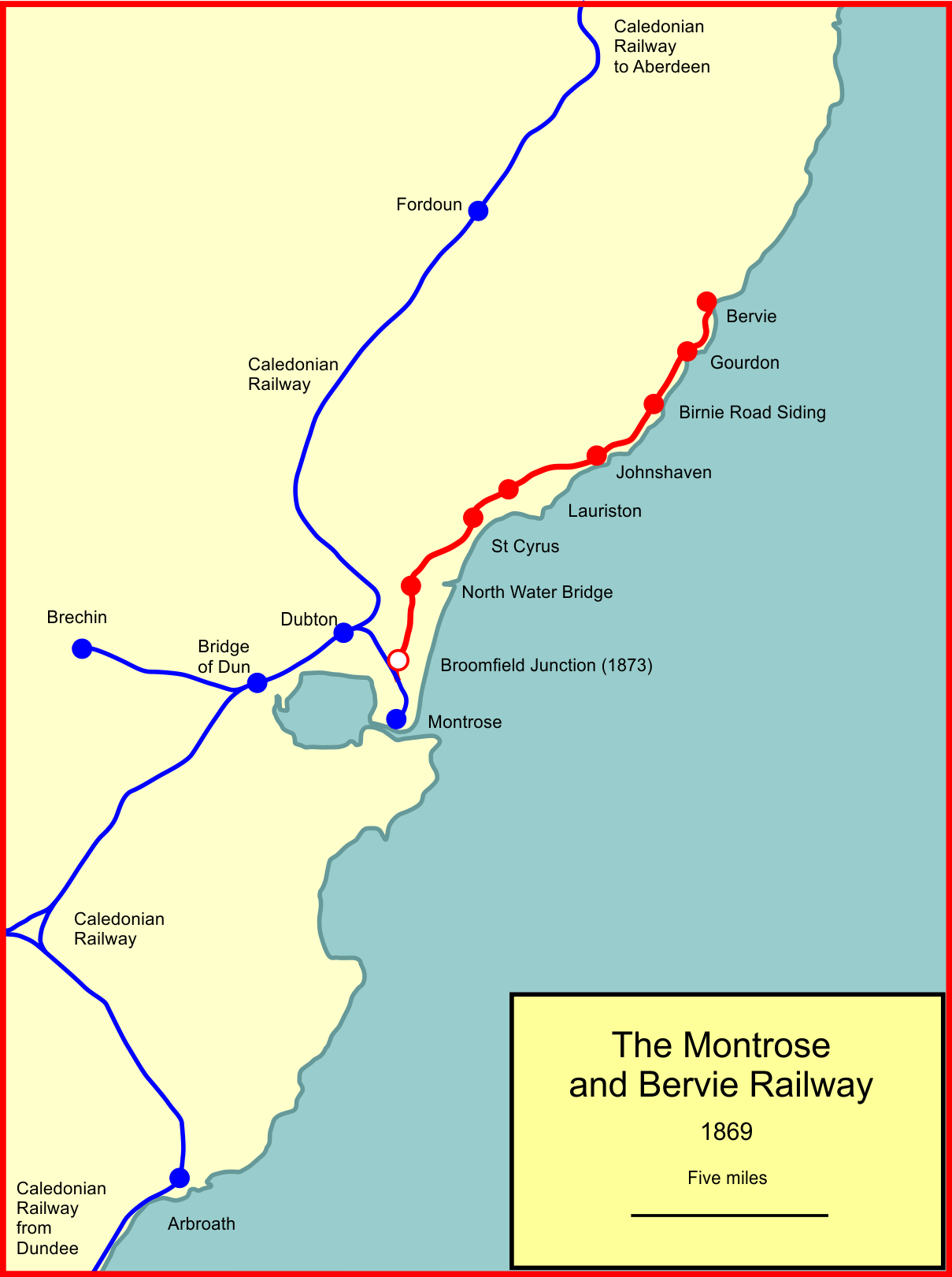
The Montrose and Bervie Railway as built

Naturally the GNoSR lost interest in the little backwater railway so far from its own network; but now the line had some share capital and the original act of Parliament, and it set about constructing the line as originally intended. By the summer of 1865 the line was nearing completion, and enquiries were made of R and W Hawthorn, who had purchased the Leith Engine Works, for a locomotive for their line, but the price must have been discouraging. The company asked the GNoSR to work the line, but this was refused, and finally the SNER worked the line. It opened on 1 November 1865. The trains used the SNER station at Montrose, joining the SNER at Broomfield Junction. (The Caledonian Railway absorbed the SNER in 1866 and took over the working.)

In the first nine months of operation an operating surplus of £152 was achieved, but this was without allowing for the toll charge for the use of the Montrose station and approach railway. At over £330 for six months alone, this turned the figures into a major loss. The company asked the Caledonian to reduce the charge, but when this was declined, the Bervie Company established a station at Broomfield Road, just on its side of the junction, and terminated its trains there. It arranged road cartage to and from Montrose.

This seems to have motivated compromise in the Caledonian, and a reduced toll charge of £150 annually was agreed; trains resumed running to Montrose (Caledonian Railway) from 8 August 1866. The Bervie directors undertook to close the Broomfield station permanently, which they did from 1 February 1867.

=== Now sponsored by the North British Railway ===
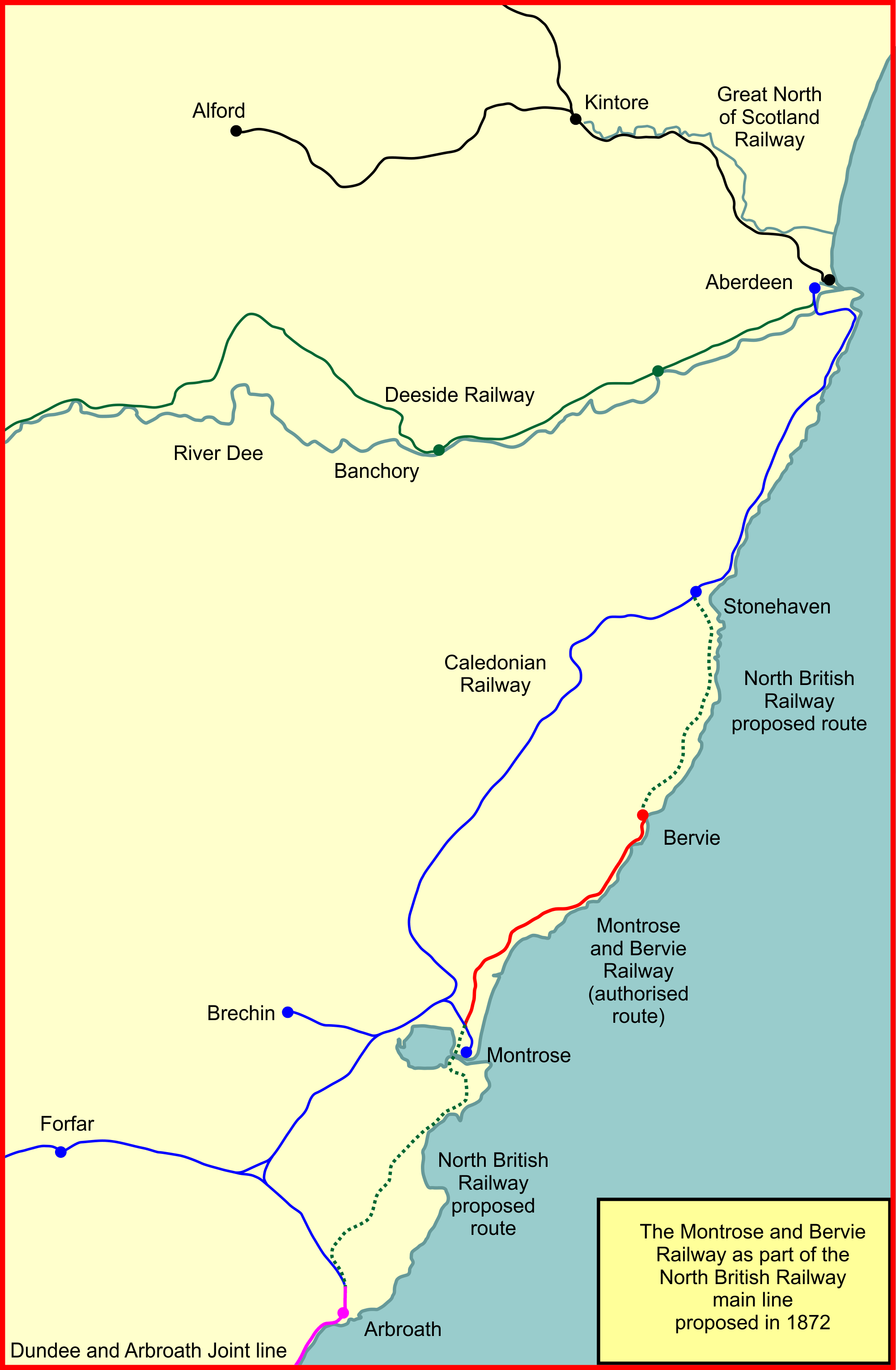
The North British Railway plan to use the Bervie Railway

The line had nearly become part of a GNoSR trunk route in 1863, and now another suitor appeared. The North British Railway (NBR) was operating a rather disjointed service between Edinburgh and Aberdeen by ferries across the Firth of Forth and Firth of Tay, and then over the Caledonian Railway via Arbroath and Stonehaven. Parliament had granted the NBR running powers over large parts of the northern section of the Caledonian Railway, in order to encourage competition. Nonetheless, this dependency on a competitor was hardly a satisfactory arrangement, and the NBR aspired to establish a route controlled by itself. Bridging the Forth and Tay was feasible, although expensive. Getting from Dundee to Arbroath would be done over the Dundee and Arbroath Railway which was to be operated jointly. A new NBR line from Arbroath to near Stonehaven could use the Montrose and Bervie line, saving construction costs.

The Caledonian had a contract with the M&BR to work the line until 1873, and fearing the NBR incursion, negotiated to extend that for a further eight years, frustrating the NBR plans.

North British and Montrose Railway Companies Amalgamation Act 1881
- Act of Parliament
- Parliament of the United Kingdom
- Long title: An Act to amalgamate the Montrose and Bervie Railway Company with the North British Railway Company; and for other purposes.
- Citation: 44 & 45 Vict. c. cxiii

Dates
- Royal assent: 18 July 1881

Text of statute as originally enacted

The Bervie line was utterly impoverished, and yet this scheme was received coldly by many local interests, who preferred retaining independence, but these reservations were overcome and under the North British and Montrose Railway Companies Amalgamation Act 1881 (44 & 45 Vict. c. cxiii) the Montrose and Bervie Railway was absorbed by the North British Railway on 1 October 1881. (This was originally intended to be 1 August; the NBR paid 65% of the face value of M&BR stock and assumed the company's mortgage debt of £18,000. The Caledonian Railway was permitted to retain running powers. The Bervie line trains now ran to the NBR station at Montrose.

The NBR had sponsored a nominally independent line from Arbroath to Montrose (the North British, Arbroath and Montrose Railway), which obtained its authorising act of Parliament, the North British, Arbroath, and Montrose Railway Act 1871 (34 & 35 Vict. c. cxxiii), on 13 July 1871, capital £171,580. There was some delay in construction, but it opened to goods traffic in 1881, and to passengers in 1883. It had its own station at Montrose, and joined the Caledonian main line at Kinnaber Junction, a few miles north of Montrose. However, the development of the Bervie line, and the new construction at its north end onward to Stonehaven, never took place.

When the North British, Arbroath and Montrose Railway opened its line, a spur was provided, authorised by the North British, Arbroath and Montrose Railway Act 1872 (35 & 36 Vict. c. xlvi),) connecting that company's main line at Montrose North Junction (immediately north of Montrose NBR station) to Broomfield Road Junction, giving access to the Bervie line.

From 2 August 1897 the Caledonian Railway started operating its own train services on the Bervie line, exercising the running powers already granted. This was hardly a commercial move, and was simply in retaliation for an imagined act of bad faith elsewhere by the NBR. Passengers on the line therefore had CR trains to the CR Montrose station and NBR trains to the NBR station. There was simply not enough traffic on the line to sustain this, and Caledonian trains stopped running from 1 October 1898. However, there were local protests at this, and Caledonian goods services quickly resumed (on 17 October), but were finally discontinued from June 1899.

The line was now simply a remote coastal branch line of the North British Railway.

=== The twentieth century ===
In 1913 the Royal Flying Corps established its first operational airfield at Broomfield Farm, adjacent to the Bervie line immediately north of Broomfield Junction. On the formation of the Royal Air Force the location became RAF Montrose. The site was used for military purposes almost continuously until closure in 1952. There was a short siding, named "Aerodrome Siding" facing from the Bervie direction at the north end of the site at Wardhouse Road. During World War II an aircraft approaching struck and demolished part of Broomfield Junction signal box.

In 1923 the North British Railway was a constituent of the new London and North Eastern Railway, following the grouping of the railways of Great Britain under the Railways Act 1921. The Caledonian Railway was a constituent of the London Midland and Scottish Railway.

By 1951 road passenger and goods services in the area had become dominant, and the line was closed to passengers. A daily goods train continued to run until 23 May 1966 when the line was closed completely.

== Train service ==
The passenger train service in 1895 consisted of six trains each way daily, with an extra Fridays only service; the journey time was typically 38 to 40 minutes. By 1922 the service had reduced to three daily with an additional Saturday trip.

In 1938 there were three daily return trips with an additional Friday train from Inverbervie to Montrose.

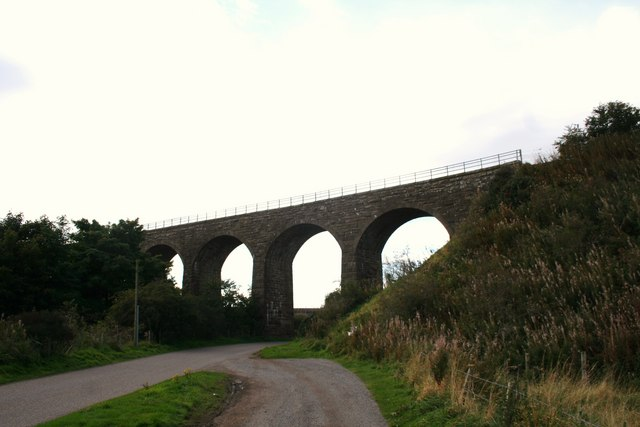
North West Water railway Bridge crosses the River North Esk

== Present-day remains ==
In many places the track bed can still be seen. The northern section, between Inverbervie and Gourdon is now a well surfaced footpath and is part of the National Cycle Network.

== Topography ==
The line ran Broomfield Road Junction to Bervie; passenger trains generally ran from and to Montrose. The line opened on 1 November 1865, and closed to passengers on 1 October 1951.

Locations on the line:

- Broomfield Road Junction; the line diverged from the Caledonian Railway;
- Broomfield Road Junction station; also known as Broomfield Road; opened with the M&BR line on 1 November 1865; (Note: Butt says the station opened when the Aberdeen Railway opened its main line in 1850, but this is a mistake; the Aberdeen Company did not have a station at the location; see the 25 inch Ordnance Survey map Forfar Sheet XXVIII.14 surveyed 1862; also Bradshaw for 1850 which shows no station there. Smith says that it opened in August 1866 or immediately after.)
- North Water Bridge; opened July 1866;
- St Cyrus;
- Lauriston;
- Johnshaven;
- Birnie Road Siding; opened November 1866; a very limited Fridays-only train service operated for most of the location's existence; Friday was market day in Montrose;
- Gourdon;
- Bervie; renamed Inverbervie 5 July 1926.

A major engineering feature on the line was the 11 arch North Water bridge crossing the River North Esk which still stands today.

Smith describes the line:

It was a very scenic stretch of railway, beginning at Broomfield Junction, north of Montrose, and striding across the North Esk near Kinnaber by means of a high stone viaduct. After a cliff top section to St Cyrus, the line wandered inland for a while before descending to the rocky shore at Johnshaven. The track then curved round the back of Gourdon village and continued along the coast to a terminus close to Bervie Bay. Architecturally the stations were undistinguished: all seven of them having basic single-storey buildings with horizontal timber planking and brick chimneys.
