= Scottish North Eastern Railway =

Railway in Scotland

The Scottish North Eastern Railway (SNER) was a railway company in Scotland operating a main line from Perth to Aberdeen, with branches to Kirriemuir, Brechin and Montrose. It was created when the Aberdeen Railway amalgamated with the Scottish Midland Junction Railway on 29 July 1856. It did not remain independent for long, for it was itself absorbed by the Caledonian Railway on 10 August 1866.

Much of its network closed in 1967 when the former North British Railway route to Aberdeen via Dundee became the main route.

== Constituents ==
=== Early authorisations ===
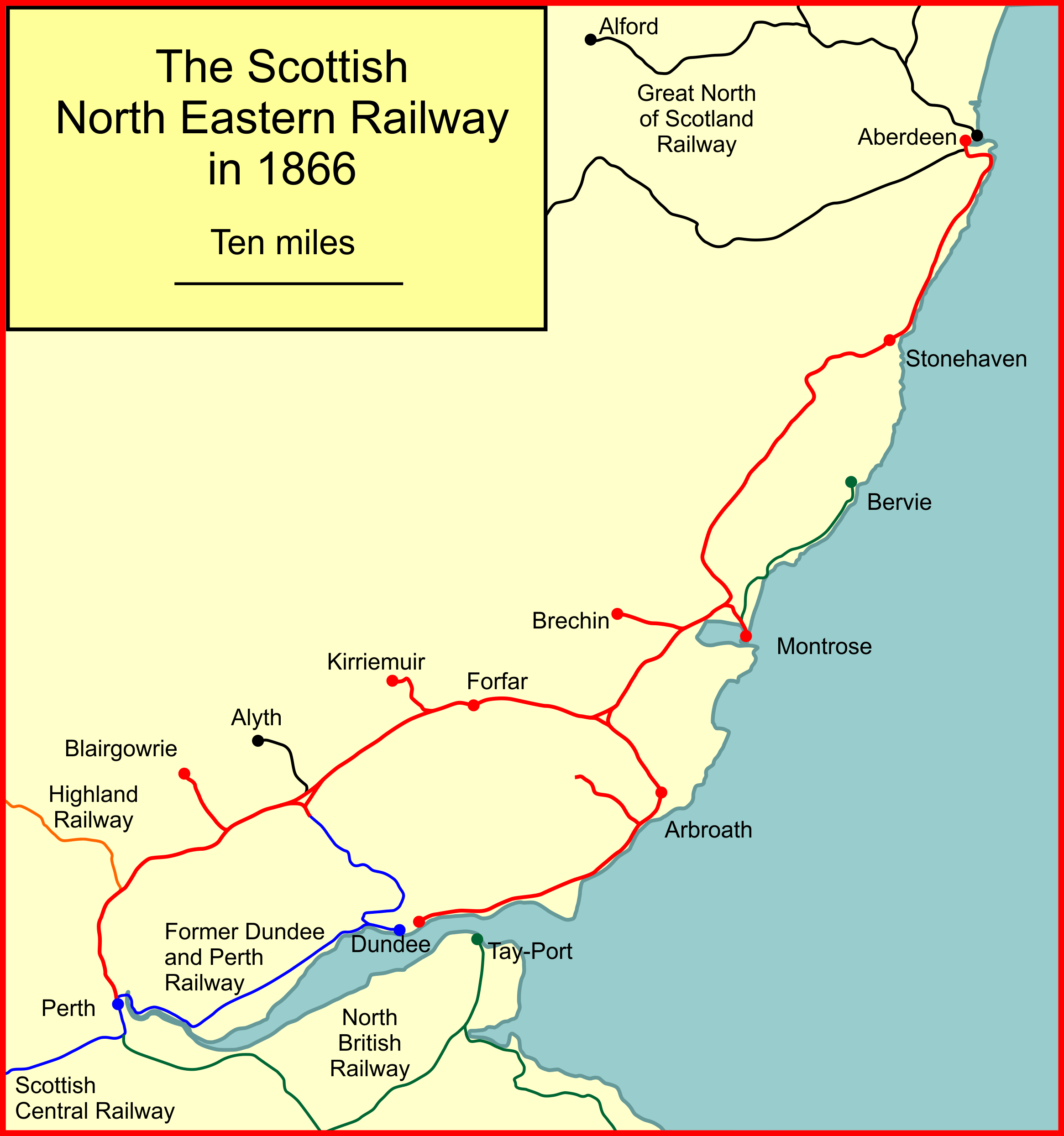
System map of the Scottish North Eastern Railway in 1866

There was a frenzy of railway promotions in Scotland in 1845; there had been widespread controversy over a route from central Scotland to England, where a railway network was forming, and the public discussion encouraged thought of Scottish routes too.

On 31 July 1845 the Caledonian Railway was authorised, with the then enormous capital of £1,500,000, to build from Glasgow and Edinburgh to Carlisle. On the same day the Scottish Central Railway (SCR), the Dundee and Perth Railway, the Aberdeen Railway and the Scottish Midland Junction Railway (SMJR) were authorised. The SCR was to build from Castlecary (forming a connection with the Caledonian and the already existing Edinburgh and Glasgow Railway) to Perth; the Aberdeen Railway was to build from Guthrie, near Arbroath, to Aberdeen, with branches to Montrose and Brechin; and it was to lease the Arbroath and Forfar Railway, a local stone block sleeper line. The SMJR was to link Perth and Forfar. Together the three railways would connect central Scotland to Perth, Forfar and Aberdeen, and with the Caledonian and its allies they would link to London as well.

Even before authorisation the Caledonian had strategic plans to control these and other, lines, forming a widespread Caledonian area of control in Scotland. As its capital would all be required to build its railway, it was unable to purchase the lines; instead it agreed leases of the other (as yet unauthorised) companies; this required no cash down payment, but a heavy commitment to periodical lease charges later. In due course, the Caledonian was to find that these payments were unaffordable, and it was able to escape them by demonstrating that they were ultra vires, that is, that their company had no powers to make such commitments. Moreover, Parliament was at times hostile to large combinations of lines, and declined to assent to some amalgamations.

Quite apart from this dubious outcome, relations between the companies were not always amicable, and in fact the Scottish Central Railway was robustly independent for some years. However the Aberdeen Railway and the SMJR remained in a "loose association" with the Caledonian.

=== The Aberdeen Railway ===
The Aberdeen Railway built its line from a triangular junction near Guthrie and Friockheim, not far from Arbroath, northwards to Aberdeen. It leased the Arbroath and Forfar Railway (A&FR), on the basis that the A&FR would upgrade its track. It had been built as a stone block sleeper line on the local track gauge of 5 ft 6in (1,676 mm) and the Aberdeen Railway seems not to have fully understood the financial implications of converting this to a modern double track main line on the standard gauge. The A&FR had very little money to pay for the conversion itself. (The Arbroath and Forfar Railway Company continued to exist until 1923 as a financial shell only, receiving the lease payment from the lessees.)

The Aberdeen company ran into financial difficulties of its own, running out of cash in 1848 after building from Guthrie to Dubton, with branches to Brechin and Montrose. After appealing for help from larger railways, it decided it did not care for the terms of any offer to help, and issued preference shares to its own shareholders (in modern parlance a rights issue). It managed to build to Ferryhill, a temporary terminus on the southern edge of Aberdeen, opening in 1850. Now the Burgh objected to plans the railway thought had been agreed, to take the line into the city, but after much negotiation the line was extended to a terminus called Guild Street in Aberdeen, opening in 1854.

=== The Scottish Midland Junction Railway ===
The SMJR built from Perth to Forfar, then an important medium-sized town, but the objective was to connect with other lines. Running through the fertile area of Strathmore, the SMJR adopted two local moribund lines, the Newtyle and Coupar Angus Railway and the Newtyle and Glammiss Railway. (Glammis is spelt Glamis nowadays.) Both of these were stone block sleeper single lines built to another local track gauge, this time 4 ft 6.5in (1,384 mm). These too needed to be modernised, the gauge altered, and the track made double. The SMJR started its line immediately north of Perth station, where the Scottish Central railway was building what became the joint station Perth General. It ran to Forfar, joining the Arbroath and Forfar line just after Forfar station.

The line opened in 1848. The SMJR built a branch line to Blairgowrie, which opened in 1855.

=== The Dundee and Arbroath Railway ===
The Dundee and Arbroath Railway (D&AR) had opened in 1838. Never intended to be part of a wider network, it adopted the track gauge of 5 ft 6in (1,676 mm) and used stone block sleeper track, like the Arbroath and Forfar Railway (A&FR). At first there was no physical link with the A&FR, or any other line.

In 1846 the Scottish Midland Junction Railway had obtained powers in the Scottish Midland Junction Railway Branches Act 1846 (9 & 10 Vict. c. lxxv) to build an extension at Arbroath to link the D&AR with the A&FR, and to convert its own track gauge to standard gauge; this was in use from 1848. There were differences of priority between the SMJR and the D&AR which led to some traffic from Aberdeen to Dundee being routed via Newtyle; this involved a transshipment of goods there (and a change of train for passengers) as the Dundee and Newtyle line still had its unique track gauge, and three rope-worked inclines.

=== The SNER in action ===
Scottish North Eastern Railway Act 1856
- Act of Parliament
- Parliament of the United Kingdom
- Long title: An Act to unite and amalgamate the Undertaking of the Scottish Midland Junction Railway Company with the Undertaking of the Aberdeen Railway Company, to be thenceforth called "The Scottish North-eastern Railway Company," and to regulate the Management of and confer additional Powers on the united Company, and for other Purposes.
- Citation: 19 & 20 Vict. c. cxxxiv

Dates
- Royal assent: 29 July 1856

Text of statute as originally enacted

From the passing of the Scottish North Eastern Railway Act 1856 (19 & 20 Vict. c. cxxxiv) on 29 July 1856 the SNER operated a railway from Perth to Aberdeen, with branches to Blairgowrie, Brechin and Montrose, as well as the stub to Newtyle, which connected with the Dundee and Newtyle Railway. The antipathy with the D&AR was done away with, and Dundee traffic was now regularly routed via Arbroath.

While the main line between Perth and Aberdeen was the highlight, there was much intermediate traffic at this date, chiefly agricultural.

At Perth the SNER used the General station build and managed by the Scottish Central Railway. The station was increasingly becoming a traffic hub, and by an act of Parliament it was transferred to the control of a joint committee, representing all the users. This took effect on 8 August 1859. The approach lines, both north and south of the station, belonged to the SCR, and the SNER was charged the equivalent of six miles running for the use of 320 yards of line on the northern approach. The SNER objected to this and when negotiation failed to produce a result, the SNER established a temporary platform just north of the SCR lines; the station was called Perth, Glasgow Road. SNER trains from the north terminated there and connecting passengers had to make their own way through the streets to the main stations. The dispute lasted a few weeks until an arbitrator allowed the SNER to use the tracks for an annual payment of £100.

In 1862 the SNER purchased the Dundee and Arbroath line.

=== Connecting to the Great North of Scotland Railway ===
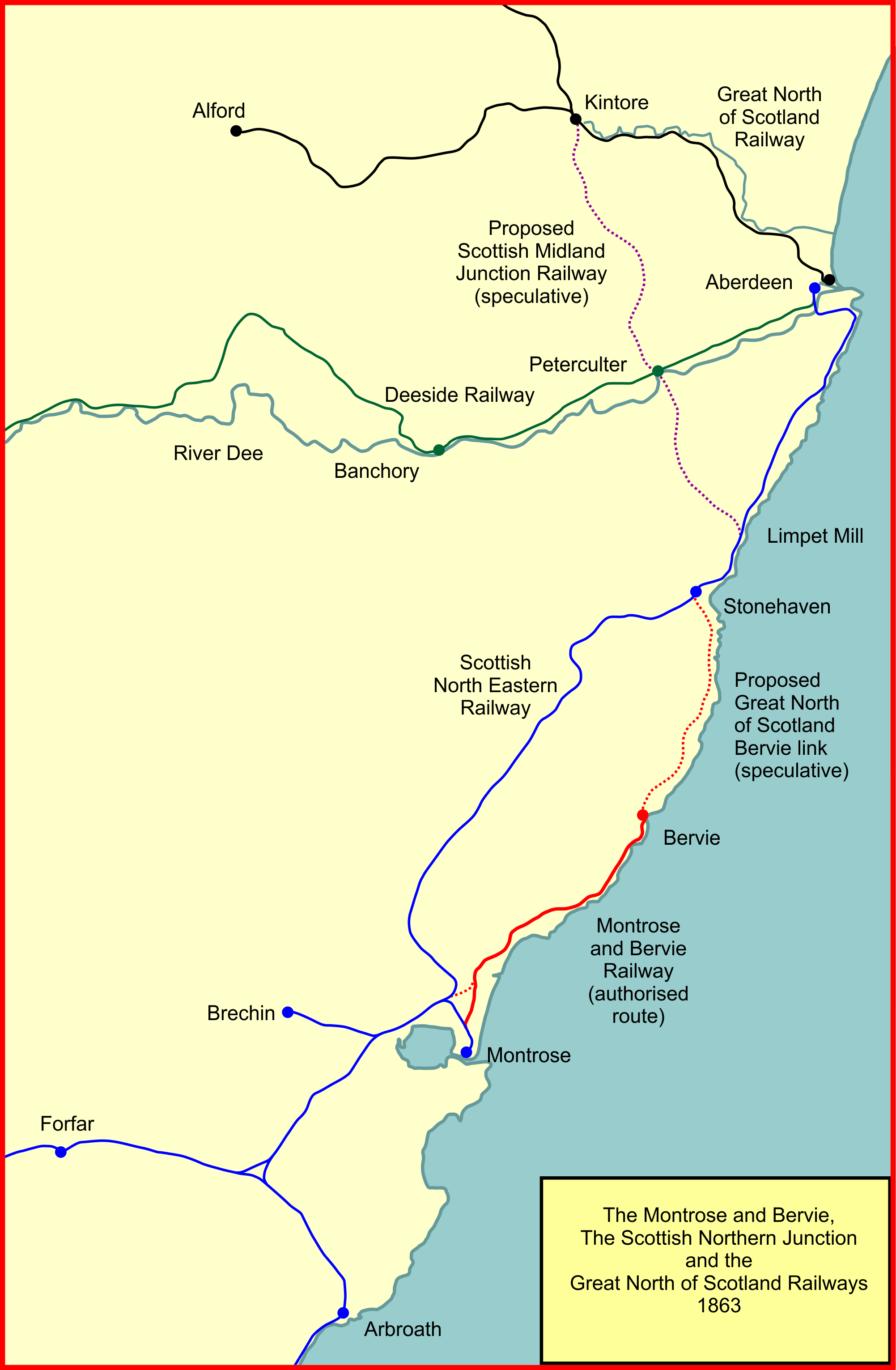
The Scottish Northern Junction Railway proposed route

The Great North of Scotland Railway (GNoSR) had a terminal at Waterloo, in Aberdeen, since 1855 (goods) and 1856 (passengers). This was some distance from the Aberdeen Railway (now SNER) Guild Street station. GNoSR traffic to the south, principally live cattle, was mostly forwarded by coastal shipping and through passengers simply had to walk between the two stations. They were 700 yards (640 m) apart. Both railways had connections to the harbour quayside but locomotive operation was prohibited on the harbour sidings. Although the GNoSR authorising act of Parliament had stipulated the construction of a line through the Denburn Valley to link with then former Aberdeen Railway, the GNoSR made it plain that it was content with the status quo, although local people and northern farmers were not.

Scottish Northern Junction Railway Act 1862
- Act of Parliament
- Parliament of the United Kingdom
- Long title: An Act for making a Railway from the Scottish North-eastern Railway near Limpet Mill to the Great North of Scotland Railway at Kintore, with Branches to the Deeside Railway at Peterculter; and for other Purposes.
- Citation: 25 & 26 Vict. c. lxxix

Dates
- Royal assent: 30 June 1862

Text of statute as originally enacted

In 1862 a new company was promoted, the Scottish Northern Junction Railway (SNJR), to by-pass Aberdeen by building a new railway from Limpet Mill, near Stonehaven, to Kintore, on the GNoSR system. The scheme was highly attractive to the SNER as it would bring it much traffic that was denied to it; equally the GNoSR was dismayed at the possibility of losing income diverted away from it. The SNJR was authorised by the Scottish Northern Junction Railway Act 1862 (25 & 26 Vict. c. lxxix), and it was heavily supported by the SNER. It was to cross the Deeside Railway at Peterculter and make two short branches connecting to it there, which would give the line access to Aberdeen in addition.

The SNJR, costing £150,000 would have difficult gradients and curves, and would by-pass Aberdeen, the most important settlement in the area, and it was obvious that a 22-mile (35 km) railway was not the most effective means of connecting the north of Scotland into the railway network, and the GNoSR was successful in inserting a clause into the Scottish Northern Junction Railway Act 1862 stipulating that if it obtained authority for a link line in Aberdeen in the next parliamentary session, the SNJR authorisation would be suspended.

At this time Aberdeen was heavily built up, and the GNoSR quickly developed a scheme that would run in a wide loop round the western margin of the city, entering the SNER Guild Street station from the south. Nonetheless it would have required significant demolitions of residential buildings, and, costing £125,000 for less than three miles (5 km) of route, it attracted considerable hostility locally; its circuitous alignment brought it the mocking epithet "Circumbendibus". It was made a parliamentary bill, the Great North of Scotland Railway (Aberdeen Junction Railway) Bill in 1863.

Denburn Valley Railway Act 1864
- Act of Parliament
- Parliament of the United Kingdom
- Long title: An Act to authorize the Scottish North-eastern Railway Company to construct a Railway to connect their Railway with the Great North of Scotland Railway at Aberdeen; to confer Powers and Obligations on them, and on the Great North of Scotland Railway Company; and for other Purposes.
- Citation: 27 & 28 Vict. c. cxi

Dates
- Royal assent: 23 June 1864

Other legislation
- Amended by: Great North of Scotland Railway (Amalgamation) Act 1866

Status: Amended

Text of statute as originally enacted

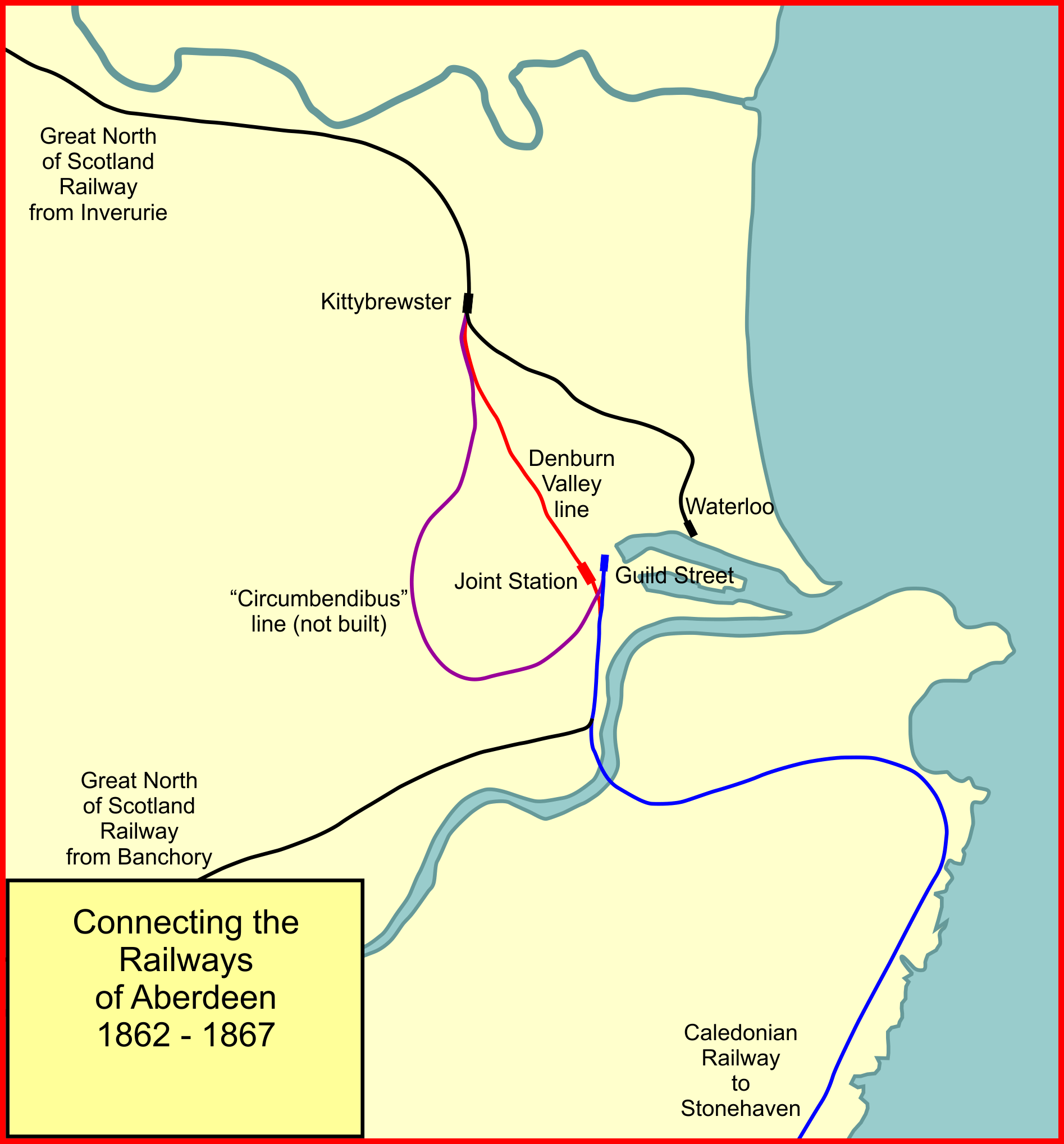
The Circumbendibus line and the Denburn Valley route

In parliamentary committee the objections were so significant that the promoters agreed that a previous proposal, the Denburn Valley Railway should be substituted, the capital of the GNoSR scheme and of the SNJR being combined for the purpose, amounting to £200,000. The Denburn Valley line would run directly from Kittybrewster on the GNoSR to a junction with the SNER near Guild Street; a new central Joint Station (to be managed by a joint committee) would be built, and the portion of line north and south of the station would be allocated respectively to the GNoSR and the SNER. The Denburn Valley Railway Act 1864 (27 & 28 Vict. c. cxi) was passed "to remove the inconvenience arising from the non-construction of the Portion of the Great North of Scotland Railway through the Denburn Valley in Aberdeen which was originally authorised as Part of that Railway". The SNJR powers, and those for the Circumbendibus line, were extinguished.

Although this was the rational solution, the Denburn Valley line was hugely expensive at £200,000, even though only 1.5 miles (2.5 km) long. Much expensive land acquisition, housing demolition, a tunnel, and the new station were all required.

The new line and the joint station came into use on 4 December 1867, by which time the SNER had been absorbed by the Caledonian Railway.

=== Methven branch ===
In 1858 a local railway promoted by local people opened, connecting Methven to Perth; it joined the SMJR main line at Almond Valley Junction, some distance north of Perth, and was worked by the SMJR, and from 1856 by the SNER. The SNER purchased it in 1864.

=== Alyth branch ===
Local interests elsewhere promoted a railway connection to Alyth, from Meigle on the former SMJR main line. It opened in 1861 and was worked by the SNER. The SNER absorbed it in 1863.

=== Sold to the Caledonian Railway ===
Caledonian and Scottish North Eastern Railways Amalgamation Act 1866
- Act of Parliament
- Parliament of the United Kingdom
- Long title: An Act for authorizing the Amalgamation of the Scottish North-eastern Railway Company with the Caledonian Railway Company; and for other Purposes.
- Citation: 29 & 30 Vict. c. cccl

Dates
- Royal assent: 10 August 1866

The Scottish North Eastern Railway had been formed by the amalgamation of two smaller companies in 1856. It had long been in a "loose association" with the Caledonian Railway, and on 10 August 1866 it was itself absorbed into the Caledonian by the Caledonian and Scottish North Eastern Railways Amalgamation Act 1866 (29 & 30 Vict. c. cccl).

The Caledonian now controlled lines from Carlisle to Aberdeen. While this appeared to be the outcome it had long desired, it came at a heavy price: Parliament was becoming uncomfortable with the monopoly power of large railway concerns, and granted the North British Railway (NBR) running powers over much of the northern part of the Caledonian system. The NBR was building its own line from Arbroath to north of Montrose, where it made a junction (Kinnaber Junction) with the Caledonian Railway. In 1878 the NBR bridged the Firth of Tay at Dundee, giving it direct access from Edinburgh and Fife to the north shore of the Firth, and Parliament ordered that the Dundee and Arbroath Railway be transferred to joint ownership: jointly between the Caledonian Railway and the NBR. This took effect from 1 February 1880, and gave the NBR an independent route from Edinburgh to Kinnaber, and running powers from there to Aberdeen.

=== From 1923 ===
Under the terms of the Railways Act 1921, the main line railways of Great Britain were "grouped"; the Caledonian Railway was a constituent of the new London Midland and Scottish Railway (LMS) and the North British Railway was a constituent of the new London and North Eastern Railway (LNER). For the time being there continued to be two competing routes to Aberdeen from the south.

When the railways were nationalised in 1948 this state of affairs continued and the pattern of passenger and goods trains remained relatively unaffected by the new common ownership. However the decline in usage of the railways, especially local railways in sparsely populated areas, forced consideration of rationalisation, and it was determined that the former NBR route should continue, with the former SNER route closing. This took effect in 1967.

The main route for trains from central Scotland to Aberdeen was therefore via Dundee, Arbroath and Montrose. Thus the Dundee and Arbroath line was still in use; the A&FR line was closed except for a short section at Arbroath from the station to the point of divergence of the NBR and Caledonian lines. The old Aberdeen Railway was retained from Kinnaber Junction to Aberdeen.

The former SMJR line from Perth to Forfar was closed except for the first section to Stanley Junction, where the Inverness line diverged. The entirety of the rest of the SNER system closed (although some local goods connections remained in use for a while).

The heritage section of the Brechin branch is now operated by the Caledonian Railway Brechin Ltd, which started operation in 1993.

The railway network is substantially unchanged from that time; domestic Scottish passenger services are operated by ScotRail. A limited through service from London to Aberdeen and from London to Inverness is operated by London North Eastern Railway. Trains to and from English destinations other than London are operated under the brand name CrossCountry, and night sleeping car trains to and from London are operated by Caledonian Sleeper.
