= Allan Glen's School =

Coordinates: 55.863512°N 4.243298°W

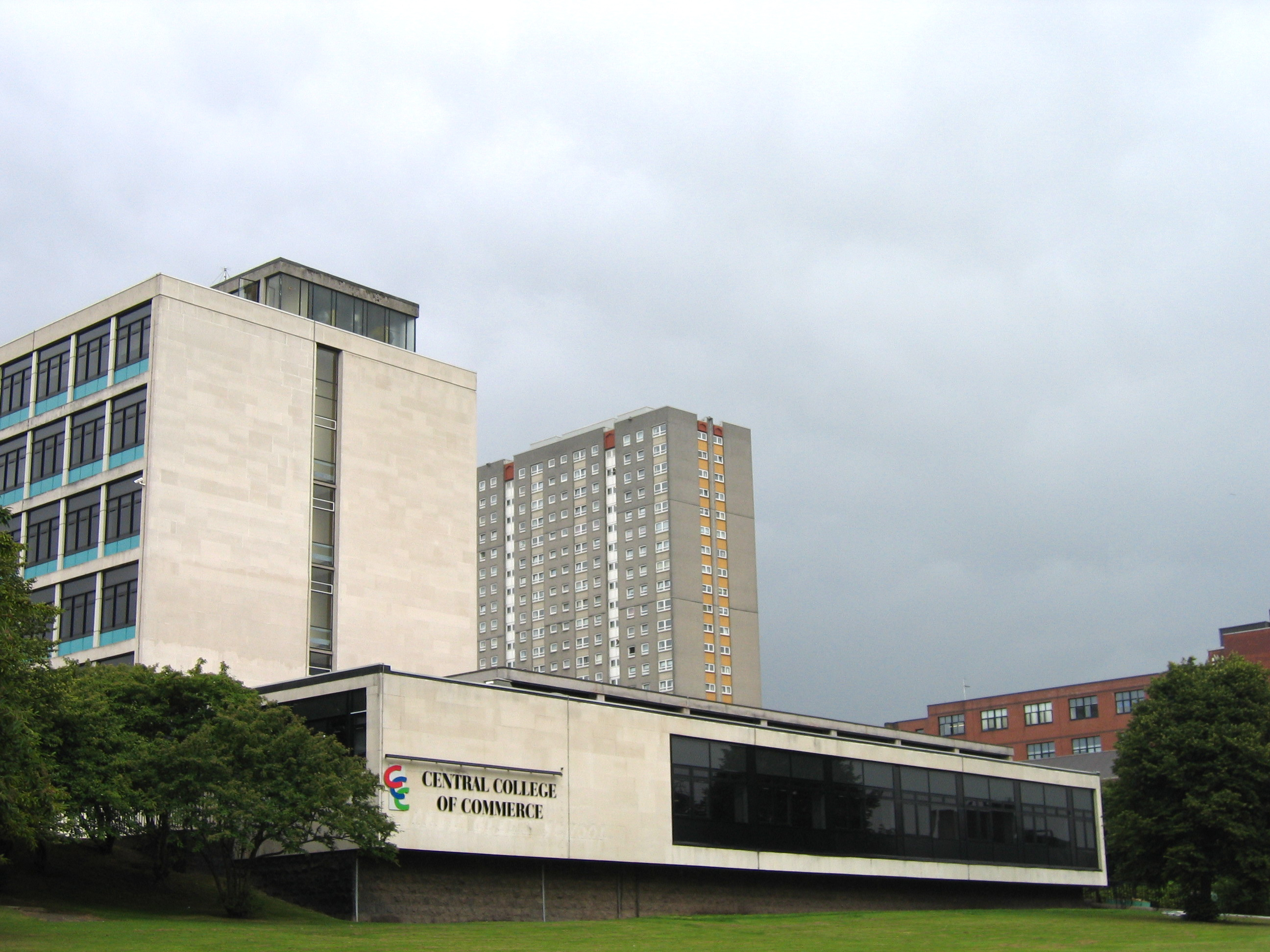
- Former Allan Glen's School Buildings opened in 1964, later part of the Central College. Now demolished.
- Glasgow; Scotland

Information
- Type: secondary school
- Motto: "Cum Scientia Humanitas" ('Humanity with knowledge' or 'civilization with science')
- Opened: 1853; ceased to be a selective school 1973; closed 1989
- School district: Townhead
- Principal: The final headmaster during the selective period of the school's existence was Ralph Finlayson
- Enrollment: c. 600
- Colors: Navy and Sky Blue

Allan Glen's School was, for most of its existence, a local authority, selective secondary school for boys in Glasgow, Scotland, charging nominal fees for tuition.

It was founded by the Allan Glen's Endowment Scholarship Trust on the death, in 1850, of Allan Glen, a successful Glasgow tradesman and businessman, "to give a good practical education and preparation for trades or businesses, to between forty to fifty boys, the sons of tradesmen or persons in the industrial classes of society". The school was formally established in 1853 and located in the Townhead district of the city, on land that Glen had owned on the corner of North Hanover Street and Cathedral Street.

== School's evolution ==
Although notionally fee-paying, the school offered a large number of bursaries and enrolled pupils from all social classes, selected on the basis of academic ability. The school's emphasis on science and engineering led to it becoming, in effect, Glasgow's High School of Science. As such, in 1887 its management merged with the nearby Anderson's College to form the Glasgow and West of Scotland Technical College which later became the Royal Technical College in 1912, the Royal College of Science and Technology in 1956, and ultimately the University of Strathclyde in 1964. By the end of 1888 a new building was ready for the school in North Hanover Street.

== Glasgow corporation ==
In 1912, the school was transferred from the newly designated Royal Technical College to the School Board of Glasgow run by Glasgow Corporation. Parents who paid domestic or business rates to Glasgow Corporation were charged a much reduced fee, enabling children from less wealthy households, but who had passed the entrance exam, to benefit from the high standard of teaching at the school. In 1923, playing fields were acquired for the school in the suburb of Bishopbriggs and in 1926 the school itself moved into the building previously occupied by Provanside Public School in North Montrose Street. In 1958 a new school building was planned on Cathedral Street, adjacent to the existing one. The new school building was opened in 1964.

== Merger with City Public School ==
Selective schooling was discontinued in Scottish local authority schools in 1972, and Allan Glen's was merged with the City Public School to become a local co-educational comprehensive school on 22 August 1973, known as Allan Glen's Secondary School. Following a major re-organisation of school provision, brought about by falling birth rates, population migration and declining school rolls throughout the city, including Allan Glen's, the school was formally closed in 1989.

== City of Glasgow College ==
Following the closure of Allan Glen's Secondary School, the buildings on Cathedral Street were converted into an annexe for the nearby Glasgow Central College of Commerce. The Cathedral Street buildings were demolished in 2013 to enable construction of the City of Glasgow College, a new entity created by the merger of three former further education Colleges, Central College, Glasgow Metropolitan College and Glasgow College of Nautical Studies.

== Playing fields ==
The playing fields first opened at Bishopbriggs in 1923 and are still owned by the Allan Glen's School Club. They provide the home ground for Allan Glen's Rugby Football Club, which currently plays in the West Regional League Division 1. In 2012, proposals were announced to sell part of the playing fields, following a change in the legal structure of the Trust that controls the assets of the Allan Glen's School Club.

== Notable alumni ==
Although the school emphasised science and engineering, many of its former pupils are also present throughout politics, business, industry, and the arts.

- Bill Aitken MSP, politician
- Sir John Anderson, 1st Baronet, of Harrold Priory, businessman
- William Auld, poet, author, translator
- Prof Dr James Allan Jamieson Bennett, pioneer of helicopter flight and designer of the Gyrodyne
- Sir Dirk Bogarde, actor and writer
- Hugh Dunbar Brown MP, politician
- Thomas Graham Brown, Electrical Engineer and co-designer of first medical ultrasound scanner.
- Walter Brown (mathematician), engineer and mathematician FRSE
- Admiral Sir Lindsay Sutherland Bryson KCB, engineer, Controller of the Navy
- Sir John Buchanan, CBE, FRS, FRAeS, MIMechE, President of the Royal Aeronautical Society, director of aircraft production [1941]
- Sir Kenneth Calman, Chief Medical Officer of Scotland
- Donald Cameron, Aeronautical Engineer and pioneer of modern hot air ballooning.
- Dr. John Arnold Cranston FRSE, Research chemist, co-discoverer of protactinium
- Sir Andrew Davidson MB ChB DL (Glasgow), Chief Medical Officer for Scotland 1941–54, footballer for Celtic F.C. and St Mirren F.C.
- Gregor Duncan, Episcopalian Bishop of Glasgow and Galloway
- Prof William Jolly Duncan FRS, pioneer researcher in aero-elasticity and air flutter
- Dr Tom Eastop, Engineer, academic and author
- Leonard Findlay, pediatrician, first person to hold the Samson Gemmell Chair of Child Health at the University of Glasgow
- Sir Harold Montague Finniston FRS, engineer and industrialist
- The Reverend Professor John Macdonald Graham CBE, Deputy Lieutenant of Aberdeen, Lord Provost of the City of Aberdeen 1961–64, Professor of Systematic Theology at The University of Aberdeen
- Sir Ian Greer, obstetrician; President and Vice Chancellor, Queen's University Belfast.
- Thomas Grier, flying ace with the Royal Air Force during the Second World War
- Bernard Parker Haigh, professor of applied mechanics in the Royal Naval College, Greenwich
- Robin Hall, singer and broadcaster
- Dr John Vernon Harrison, structural geologist and explorer
- Prof John Gordon Harrower FRSE, anatomist
- Prof James Blacklock Henderson, naval architect, inventor, academic
- Bill Hill (computing graphics pioneer), computing graphics pioneer with Microsoft
- Sir James Colquhoun Irvine, Scientist, academic and educator, Principal and Vice-Chancellor of the University of St Andrews 1921–52.
- James Alexander Jameson CBE, LH, Hon MIMechE, mechanical engineer, director of the Anglo-Iranian Oil Company
- SVT Jeffrey, pioneer of the Canadian Pacific Railway, member of the first Scottish Schoolboys' international football team
- Sir William Alexander Jeffrey, KCB, civil servant
- David Cunningham King, South African businessman and chairman Of Rangers Football Club
- Sir Robert Alan Langlands, academic, educator, vice-chancellor of the University of Leeds
- Prof Donald Neil McArthur FRSE, director of the Macaulay Institute of Soil Research
- Angus John Macdonald, Baron Macdonald of Tradeston
- Michael William Frederick MacKenzie, MSP
- Stuart McKellar. Venture Socialist. Labour Member of Northumberland County Council. Founding Chair of the North East Social Enterprise Partnership.
- Charles Rennie Mackintosh, architect, artist and designer
- Hugh Miller MacMillan, Shipbuilding Engineer. Lloyd's Register of Shipping. Founder, chairman and managing director of Blythswood Shipbuilding Co. Ltd.
- Wing Commander Norman Macmillan OBE, MC, combat pilot, test pilot and author
- David Forbes Martyn, physicist, radiographer, founder of Australian Academy of Science
- Ian McCallum, naval architect and chief designer for the liner Queen Elizabeth 2, Lloyd's Chief Ship Surveyor.
- Sir John Mills McCallum, MP, politician
- Sir Andrew McCance DL DSc LLD (Strathclyde) FRS, metallurgist, industrialist, chair of Governors of the Royal College of Science and Technology
- Duncan MacRae, actor, comedian.
- Sir Robert Arthur McCrindle, MP, politician
- Henry Bell McCubbin, MEP, politician
- Harry Duncan McGowan, 1st Baron McGowan KBE, chairman and managing director of Imperial Chemical Industries
- Roderick M McKay, chess international master
- David Gemmell McKinlay FRSE, civil Engineer and academic
- James McKissack, Prominent Scottish architect and photographer
- Jack McLean (journalist), journalist, author
- Sir James McFadyen McNeill, principal naval architect for the Queen Mary and Queen Elizabeth
- Grant Morrison, comic book writer and playwright.
- Prof Thomas Crawford Phemister, FRSE, geologist
- Dr James Phemister, FRSE, geologist
- Craig Pritchett, chess international master
- George Strachan Ramsay, footballer, Royal Air Force, killed in action 1918
- Jon Rankin, MP, politician
- Dr Gordon Rintoul, CBE FRSE, director of National Museums Scotland
- Brian Alexander Robertson, actor, singer, composer
- Sir David Robertson, MP, politician
- Prof William Russell FRSE, molecular virologist, founder of Scientists for Labour
- Prof Alan Sked, Academic, politician and founder of the UK Independence Party
- John Kendrick Skinner VC, DCM
- Robert Haldane Smith, Baron Smith of Kelvin, chairman of the Green Investment Bank; BBC governor
- Alan Spence Author, poet, playwright, emeritus professor of creative writing at Aberdeen University
- Rev Campbell Stephen, MP, politician
- Dr Walter Wilson Stothers, Scottish Mathematician. PhD in Number Theory, Cambridge University (1972). Proved the Mason-Stothers theorem in 1981.
- Hugh Brown Sutherland, Emeritus Professor of Civil Engineering, Vice President, Institution of Civil Engineers, renowned Soil Mechanics expert
- George Walker Thomson, prominent trade unionist, President of the Trades Union Congress for 1946/47.
- Sinclair Thomson RSA, Artist, winner of the Royal Scottish Academy's Guthrie Award in 1948 and elected a member of RSA in 1952.
- Alexander Robertus Todd, Baron Todd, OM, PRS, FRSE, Nobel laureate, biochemist
- Edward Tull Warnock, first professionally-qualified black dentist in Britain.
- Sir Archibald Boyd Tunnock, Businessman and Philanthropist.
- Prof George Macdonald Urquhart FRSE FRCVS eminent Veterinarian, developer of the Dictol cattle vaccine.
- Sir John Weir, GCVO, Royal Victorian Chain, Physician Royal
- William Douglas Weir, 1st Viscount Weir GCB, PC, engineer, industrialist
- Prof Henry Wallace Wilson FRSE, nuclear physicist, first director of the Scottish Universities' Research and Reactor Centre
- Robert Winter, politician, former Lord Provost of Glasgow
- George Ralston Wyllie, MBE, artist and sculptor
- William Henderson McAteer, MBE, journalist and historian

== Sources ==
- Allan Glen's School Club
