= James Andrew Robbie =

Scottish geologist

James Andrew Robbie FRSE FGS (1910–1977) was a 20th century Scottish geologist. He was President of the Edinburgh Geological Society 1971 to 1973.

== Life ==
He was born in Laurencekirk, Kincardineshire in 1910. He studied Science at Aberdeen University graduating BSc in 1934. In 1935 he was appointed an official Geologist with HM Geological Survey. In the Second World War he served in the Royal Engineers.

In 1968 he was elected a Fellow of the Royal Society of Edinburgh. His proposers were George Hoole Mitchell, James Phemister, Thomas Phemister, James Ernest Richey, Frederick Henry Stewart, and Archibald Gordon MacGregor. He served as Vice President to the Society 1975 to 1977. He was elected a Fellow of the Royal Astronomical Society in 1931. He was President of the Edinburgh Mathematical Society 1934/5.

In 1959 he was promoted to District Geologist for the Northern Ireland section. He then served as President of the Belfast Geologists Society. In 1967 he left HM Geological Survey to take on the role of Director of the Institute of Geological Sciences in Edinburgh.

He died on 19 May 1977.

== Publications ==
- Geology of the Country around Dungannon (1961)
- Geology of the Country around Ballycastle (1966)
