= Mearns Academy =

Location
- Aberdeen Road; Laurencekirk, Aberdeenshire, AB30 1ZJ; Scotland

Information
- School type: Secondary school
- Local authority: Aberdeenshire Council
- Rector: Gareth Campbell
- Gender: Coeducational
- Age: 11 to 18
- Enrolment: 680
- Houses: Thornton, Johnston, Conveth, Drumtochty
- School years: S1-S6
- Website: Mearns Academy

Mearns Academy is a secondary school in Laurencekirk, Aberdeenshire, Scotland. As well as Laurencekirk itself, the school also serves the surrounding villages of St Cyrus, Marykirk, Fettercairn, Auchenblae, Luthermuir, Edzell Woods and Fordoun.

Mearns Academy moved into a new building in 2014 and currently services 680 students. The new school was built as the conditions at the former building had been seen as unacceptable to councils. The former Mearns Academy school building was the former primary school before it moved. The current rector is Mr. Gareth Campbell who took over in 2018 from Mr. David Martindale. The school has sports teams that compete in rugby, football (boys and girls), netball, cross country running and volleyball. The school's house system has four houses: Thornton, Johnston, Conveth and the latest, established in 2017, Drumtochty.

== Awards ==
In 2003, the school was awarded the Charter Mark. In 2010, the school was awarded the Customer Service Excellence Standard

== Incidents ==
In 2019, the school made news following a viral interaction between a 17-year-old student and his teacher regarding the topic of genders. The teacher discussed the idea of two genders being antiquated, to which the student responded "But sir, there's only two genders." After being removed from class, the teacher told the student in a recorded interaction that he was entitled to his opinion on the number of genders, but that his opinion was not inclusive enough to be welcome at the school, being an inclusive establishment. The student remarked that he did not find such an action to be inclusive of him. Following the video of the conversation going viral online, the school suspended the student as he was not allowed to film a teacher. Despite stating that the punishment was regarding consent to be filmed and not the nature of the conversation, the school has maintained its stance on inclusivity with a spokesman saying “In our schools, fostering good relations among different groups can be a real challenge but our aim is to support a fairer, inclusive environment for all."

== Notable former pupils ==
- Ryan Gauld, footballer
- John Souttar, footballer
- Harry Souttar, footballer
