= George Ramsay (footballer, born 1892) =

Scottish footballer

Personal information
- Full name: George Strachan Ramsay
- Date of birth: 18 October 1892
- Place of birth: Clydebank, Scotland
- Date of death: 8 August 1918 (aged 25)
- Place of death: near Bethencourt-sur-Somme, France
- Position: Inside right

Senior career*
Years	Team	Apps	(Gls)
- Clydebank Juniors
1911–1912	Queen's Park	41	(7)
1912–1913	Rangers	3	(0)
1913–1914	Ayr United	15	(11)
1914	Third Lanark		
1914–1917	Partick Thistle	42	(10)
- * Club domestic league appearances and goals

George Strachan Ramsay (18 October 1892 – 8 August 1918) was a Scottish professional footballer who played in the Scottish League for Queen's Park, Rangers, Ayr United and Partick Thistle as an inside right.

== Personal life ==
Ramsay attended Allan Glen's School and in 1911 was working as an apprentice marine engineer in Glasgow. Ramsay served as a flight lieutenant in 110 and 49 Squadrons of the Royal Air Force during the First World War and was flying an Airco DH.9 when he and his observer were shot down and killed near the bridge at Béthencourt-sur-Somme on 8 August 1918, during the Battle of Amiens. He is commemorated on the Arras Flying Services Memorial.

== Career statistics ==
Appearances and goals by club, season and competition
Club	Season	League			Scottish Cup		Other		Total	
Club	Season	Division	Apps	Goals	Apps	Goals	Apps	Goals	Apps	Goals
Queen's Park	1910–11	Scottish Division One	10	2	2	0	1 (Note: Appearance in Glasgow Merchants Charity Cup)	0	13	2
Queen's Park	1911–12	Scottish Division One	31	4	2	1	2 (Note: 1 appearance in Glasgow Cup, 1 appearance in Glasgow Merchants Charity Cup)	0	35	5
Queen's Park	Total		41	6	4	1	3	0	48	7
Rangers	1912–13	Scottish Division One	3	0	0	0	0	0	3	0
Ayr United	1913–14	Scottish Division One	15	11	—		—		15	11
Third Lanark	1913–14	Scottish Division One	0	0	5	2	—		5	2
Partick Thistle	1914–15	Scottish Division One	27	3	—		—		27	3
Partick Thistle	1915–16	Scottish Division One	13	7	—		—		13	7
Partick Thistle	1916–17	Scottish Division One	2	0	—		—		2	0
Partick Thistle	Total		42	10	—		—		42	10
Career total			101	27	9	3	3	0	113	30
