= Mason's theorem =

Mason's theorem may refer to either of the following:

- The Mason–Stothers theorem, a mathematical theorem about polynomials
- Mason's gain formula, a method for finding the transfer function of a linear signal-flow graph
