= John Gordon Harrower =

Scottish anatomist

John Gordon Harrower FRSE FRCSE (1890–1936) was a Scottish anatomist. He was an expert on the human skull, and classified many separate Asiatic types.

Harrower was born on 4 April 1890 in Glasgow the son of John Harrower in Langside in the south of the city. He won a scholarship to Allan Glen's School and was educated alongside contemporaries such as John Vernon Harrison. Initially training primarily in mathematics and electricity, in 1910 he obtained a senior post at Glasgow Tramways Power Station, which he retained until 1919.

His interested shifted from electricity to radiology, and he retrained as a physician. He attended night school at the Royal Technical College in Glasgow and graduated MB ChB in 1913 and gained his doctorate in 1918. In 1919 he became a Demonstrator (dissecting bodies in front of students during anatomy lectures) at Glasgow University. In 1922 he was given a professorship to teach anatomy at the Singapore Medical College. In 1925 he was granted his DSc from the University of Edinburgh for his thesis A Study of the Hokien and the Tamil Skull, sampled from coolies originated from Tamil and Southern Fujian in Singapore, became a commonly cited source in Chinese literature as the dimensions of the skulls of "modern Southern Chinese". In 1926 he was elected a Fellow of the Royal Society of Edinburgh. His proposers were Thomas Hastie Bryce, Sir John Graham Kerr, Diarmid Noel Paton, and Ralph Stockman.

He died in Singapore on 9 April 1936, a few days after his 46th birthday.

== Publications ==
- A Study of the Hokien and the Tamil Skull (1926)
- Variations in the Region of the Foramen Magnum (1923)
- A Study of the Crania of the Hylam Chinese (1931)
