= Harry Souttar =

Australian soccer player (born 1998)

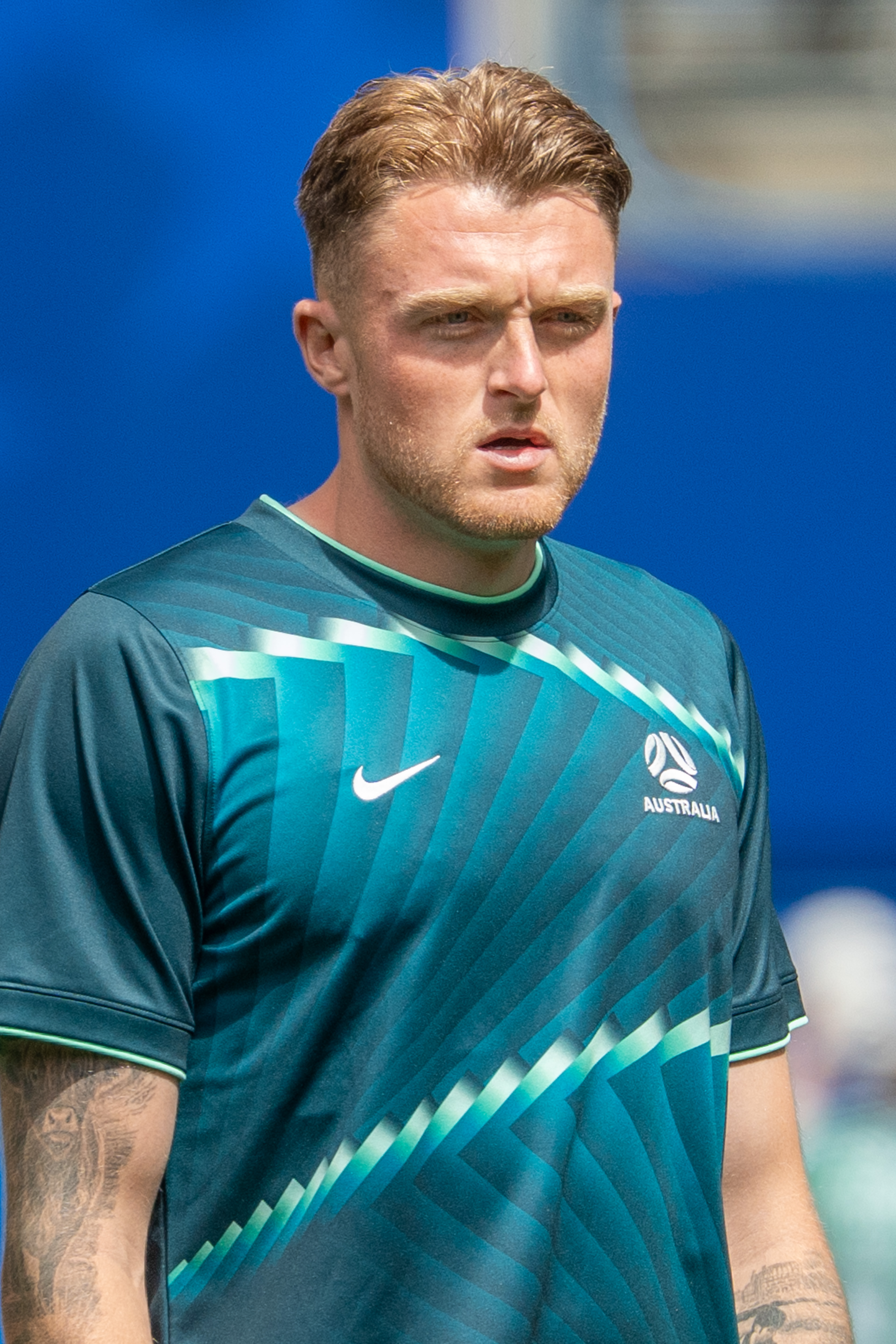
- Souttar with Australia in 2026

Personal information
- Full name: Harry James Souttar
- Date of birth: 22 October 1998 (age 28)
- Place of birth: Aberdeen, Scotland
- Height: 2.00 m (6 ft 7 in)
- Position: Centre-back

Team information
- Current team: Leicester City
- Number: 15

Youth career
- Brechin City Boys
- Celtic
- 2013–2015: Dundee United

Senior career*
Years	Team	Apps	(Gls)
2015–2016	Dundee United	2	(1)
2016–2023	Stoke City	61	(1)
2018	→ Ross County (loan)	13	(0)
2019–2020	→ Fleetwood Town (loan)	45	(4)
2023–	Leicester City	18	(1)
2024–2025	→ Sheffield United (loan)	21	(0)

International career^{‡}
2015–2016	Scotland U17	2	(0)
2016–2017	Scotland U19	3	(0)
2019–2021	Australia Olympic	7	(0)
2019–	Australia	46	(11)
- * Club domestic league appearances and goals as of 02:43, 16 August 2026 (UTC) ‡ National team caps and goals as of 08:54, 18 November 2026 (UTC)

Harry James Souttar (born 22 October 1998) is a professional football player who plays as a centre-back for EFL League One club Leicester City. Born in Scotland, he plays for the Australia national team.

Souttar began his senior career in Scotland with Dundee United before moving to England with Stoke City in 2016. He then joined Leicester City in 2023. After initially representing Scotland at youth level, he switched to play for Australia in 2019 and was a member of their squad at the 2022 FIFA World Cup. His brother, John Souttar, plays for Rangers and the Scotland national team.

== Early life ==
Souttar grew up in Luthermuir and attended Luthermuir Primary School Luthermuir, and subsequently Mearns Academy in Laurencekirk. He played youth football for Brechin City Boys Club and was attached to Celtic before joining the academy at Dundee United in July 2013. His older brother John is also a professional footballer and plays for Rangers, as well as representing Scotland. Their mother Heather was born in Port Hedland, Western Australia which meant the Souttar brothers were eligible to represent either Australia or Scotland at the international level. They grew up supporting Brechin City where their father, Jack, had played in the 1970s.

== Club career ==
=== Dundee United ===
Souttar played for the Dundee United development team, including alongside his brother John in February 2015. Having featured in a number of match day squads and having been listed as a substitute for the first team, Souttar signed a contract extension in December 2015, tying him to Dundee United until May 2018. He made his first team debut against Partick Thistle in a Scottish Premiership match on 10 May 2016 and scored his first senior goal against Kilmarnock four days later.

Premier League club Stoke City became interested in signing Souttar, and although Dundee United rejected two bids to buy the player during June 2016, it was reported during August 2016 that the clubs had agreed an initial £200,000 fee for his transfer.

=== Stoke City ===
Despite an agreement for Souttar's transfer to Stoke City having been reached before the end of the transfer window on 31 August, completion was delayed pending FIFA approval due to the player being under 18 years old. He officially joined Stoke on 29 September 2016, signing a three-year contract for an undisclosed fee. Souttar made his Stoke debut on 23 August 2017 in a 4–0 EFL Cup win over Rochdale. After signing a new contract with Stoke, Souttar joined Scottish Premiership side Ross County on 24 January 2018 until the end of the season. He played 13 times for the Staggies but was unable to help them avoid relegation to the Scottish Championship.

On 30 January 2019, Souttar joined EFL League One side Fleetwood Town on loan for the remainder of the 2018–19 season. Souttar played 11 times for Fleetwood, scoring once against Accrington Stanley. Souttar re-joined Fleetwood on loan for the 2019–20 season. Souttar played regularly under Joey Barton in 2019–20 and his performances earned him the EFL Young Player of the Month award for February 2020. The League One season was ended early due to the COVID-19 pandemic and the table was decided via points per game which saw Fleetwood quality for the EFL League One play-offs in sixth place, where they faced Wycombe Wanderers and lost 6–3 on aggregate.

Souttar made his league debut for Stoke City on 26 September 2020 in a 1–0 win away to Preston North End, and was named as the man of the match. Due to a number of outstanding performances, he was named Stoke City's Player Of The Month in October. Souttar established himself as a key member of Michael O'Neill's side in 2020–21 and he signed a new long term contract with the club in February 2021. He scored his first goal for Stoke in a 2–0 win over Wycombe Wanderers on 6 March 2021. Souttar made 43 appearances in 2020–21 as Stoke finished in 14th position. Souttar began the 2021–22 season in good form having been part of a Stoke defence that had conceded 19 goals in 17 games with the Potters fifth in the Championship before he suffered a season ending anterior cruciate ligament injury whilst playing for Australia in November 2021. Souttar made his return a year later prior to the start of the 2022 FIFA World Cup. After returning to England following the World Cup, Souttar attracted bids from Premier League clubs.

=== Leicester City ===
On 31 January 2023, Souttar joined Leicester City on a five-and-a-half-year contract for an undisclosed fee. The fee was reported by the BBC to be £15 million which could eventually rise to £20 million with add-ons.

==== Loan to Sheffield United ====
On 6 August 2024, Souttar was loaned to Championship club Sheffield United for the 2024–25 season. After making 22 appearances for the club, he ruptured his Achilles tendon during Sheffield United's Boxing Day defeat to Burnley. Manager Chris Wilder told BBC Radio Sheffield that Souttar will return to Leicester for treatment.

== International career ==
Souttar made his debut for the Scotland under-17 team against Romania in February 2015. On 6 March 2019, he was called up to the Australia national under-23 team.

On 10 October 2019, Souttar switched allegiance and debuted for the senior Australian national team at 20 years of age in a World Cup qualifier against Nepal, and scored twice in a 5–0 win; the fourth goal was initially recorded as a Nepalese own goal, but eventually was awarded to Souttar by FIFA. Souttar would go on to score two more goals for Australia in a 7–1 win against Chinese Taipei in his second game for the national team.

At 2.00 metres (6 ft 7 in), Souttar is the tallest outfield player to have represented the senior Australia national team, and the second tallest player ever, behind goalkeeper Zeljko Kalac at 2.02 metres (6 ft 8 in).

Souttar qualified for the Tokyo 2020 Olympics. He was part of the Olyroos Olympic squad. The team beat Argentina in their first group match but were unable to win another match. They were therefore not in medal contention.

Souttar was named in Australia's squad for the 2022 FIFA World Cup in November 2022. Souttar received significant praise for his defensive performances during the tournament.

On 31 May 2026, Souttar was selected in the 26-man squad for the 2026 FIFA World Cup.

Souttar captained the Socceroos for the first time in the friendly match against Switzerland on the eve of the 2026 FIFA World Cup.

== Career statistics ==
=== Club ===
As of match played 15 August 2026

Appearances and goals by club, season and competition
Club	Season	League			National cup		League cup		Other		Total	
Club	Season	Division	Apps	Goals	Apps	Goals	Apps	Goals	Apps	Goals	Apps	Goals
Dundee United	2015–16	Scottish Premiership	2	1	0	0	0	0	—		2	1
Dundee United	2016–17	Scottish Championship	0	0	0	0	1	0	0	0	1	0
Dundee United	Total		2	1	0	0	1	0	0	0	3	1
Stoke City U23	2017–18	—			—		—		3 (Note: Appearances in EFL Trophy)	0	3	0
Stoke City U23	2018–19	—			—		—		3	0	3	0
Stoke City U23	Total		—		—		—		6	0	6	0
Stoke City	2017–18	Premier League	0	0	0	0	1	0	—		1	0
Stoke City	2018–19	Championship	0	0	0	0	1	0	—		1	0
Stoke City	2019–20	Championship	0	0	0	0	0	0	—		0	0
Stoke City	2020–21	Championship	38	1	1	0	4	0	—		43	1
Stoke City	2021–22	Championship	16	0	0	0	2	1	—		18	1
Stoke City	2022–23	Championship	7	0	0	0	0	0	—		7	0
Stoke City	Total		61	1	1	0	8	1	—		70	2
Ross County (loan)	2017–18	Scottish Premiership	13	0	0	0	0	0	—		13	0
Fleetwood Town (loan)	2018–19	League One	11	1	0	0	—		0	0	11	1
Fleetwood Town (loan)	2019–20	League One	34	3	3	0	1	0	3 (Note: Two appearances in League One play-offs, one appearance in EFL Trophy)	0	41	3
Fleetwood Town (loan)	Total		45	4	3	0	1	0	3	0	52	4
Leicester City	2022–23	Premier League	12	0	0	0	0	0	—		12	0
Leicester City	2023–24	Championship	3	0	0	0	1	0	—		4	0
Leicester City	2025–26	Championship	2	1	0	0	0	0	—		2	1
Leicester City	2026–27	League One	1	0	0	0	1	0	—		2	0
Leicester City	Total		18	1	0	0	2	0	—		20	1
Sheffield United (loan)	2024–25	Championship	21	0	0	0	1	0	0	0	22	0
Career total			159	7	4	0	13	1	9	0	185	8

=== International ===
As of match played 17 November 2026

Appearances and goals by national team and year
National team	Year	Apps	Goals
Australia	2019	2	4
Australia	2020	0	0
Australia	2021	8	2
Australia	2022	4	0
Australia	2023	7	4
Australia	2024	15	1
Australia	2025	0	0
Australia	2026	10	0
Total		46	11

As of match played 19 November 2024. Australia score listed first, score column indicates score after each Souttar goal.

International goals by date, venue, cap, opponent, score, result and competition
No.	Date	Venue	Cap	Opponent	Score	Result	Competition
1	10 October 2019	Canberra Stadium, Canberra, Australia	1	Nepal	3–0	5–0	2022 FIFA World Cup qualification
2	10 October 2019	Canberra Stadium, Canberra, Australia	1	Nepal	4–0	5–0	2022 FIFA World Cup qualification
3	15 October 2019	National Stadium, Kaohsiung, Taiwan	2	Chinese Taipei	5–1	7–1	2022 FIFA World Cup qualification
4	15 October 2019	National Stadium, Kaohsiung, Taiwan	2	Chinese Taipei	7–1	7–1	2022 FIFA World Cup qualification
5	7 June 2021	Jaber Al-Ahmad International Stadium, Kuwait City, Kuwait	3	Chinese Taipei	1–0	5–1	2022 FIFA World Cup qualification
6	15 June 2021	Jaber Al-Ahmad International Stadium, Kuwait City, Kuwait	5	Jordan	1–0	1–0	2022 FIFA World Cup qualification
7	9 September 2023	AT&T Stadium, Arlington, United States	17	Mexico	1–0	2–2	Friendly
8	18 October 2023	Gtech Community Stadium, London, United Kingdom	19	New Zealand	1–0	2–0	Soccer Ashes
9	16 November 2023	AAMI Park, Melbourne, Australia	20	Bangladesh	1–0	7–0	2026 FIFA World Cup qualification
10	21 November 2023	Jaber Al-Ahmad International Stadium, Kuwait City, Kuwait	21	Palestine	1–0	1–0	2026 FIFA World Cup qualification
11	28 January 2024	Jassim bin Hamad Stadium, Al Rayyan, Qatar	26	Indonesia	4–0	4–0	2023 AFC Asian Cup

== Honours ==
Leicester City

- EFL Championship: 2023–24

== See also ==
- List of Australia international soccer players born outside Australia
- List of Scottish football families
