= Marjorie Sweeting =

British geomorphologist

- Born: 28 February 1920; Fulham, London
- Died: 31 December 1994 (aged 74); Oxford, England
- Resting place: Enstone, Oxfordshire
- Scientific career
- Fields: Geomorphologist

Marjorie Mary Sweeting (28 February 1920 – 31 December 1994 in Oxford), was a British geomorphologist specializing in karst phenomena. Sweeting had gained extensive knowledge on various topographies and landscapes by travelling around the world to places such as Greece, Australia, Czechoslovakia, United States, Canada, South Africa, Belize, and most notably China. She published Karst Landforms (Macmillan 1972), and Karst in China: its Geomorphology and Environment (Springer 1995). The latter is the first comprehensive Western account of China's karst, and one of the first western published works on the karst found within China, despite being a male dominated field.

== Personal life and education ==
Marjorie May Sweeting was born to George Scotland Sweeting and his wife Ellen Louisa Liddiard in Fulham in 1920. She had no siblings. Her father George Sweeting (1889-1977) was a geology lecturer at Imperial College, London who co-authored the 1951 textbook "The Elements of Field Geology", the third edition of that book was jointly edited by Marjorie and her father in 1972.

Her secondary education took place in Mayfield School and she later graduated in 1941 from Newnham College, Cambridge. She was accepted as a Caroline Turtle Research Fellow at Newnham College, Cambridge during 1942 for a year, which later she returned in 1945 for the Marion Kennedy Research. She received her doctorate for her thesis "The Landforms on Carboniferous Limestone of the Ingleborough District in N.W. Yorkshire" in 1948.

Alongside her passion for fieldwork, conferencing and teaching, Sweeting enjoyed travelling, the opera, and watching entertainment such as sports. Sweeting rowed in the Cambridge Women’s Blue Boat as she was an active member of the community and enjoyed partaking in such events.

Marjorie Sweeting died in 1994 at the age of 74 after succumbing to cancer, her body was interred at Enstone Village. Marjorie had no living relatives, for this reason her estate contributed funds to St. Hughs College, Newnham College, Oxford, The Royal Geographical Society and Cambridge.

== Career ==
In 1987, Marjorie Sweeting retired from her position as a reader in Geography at The University of Oxford. She was also a Tutor at St Hugh's College 1951–1987 (Emeritus), as well as a lecturer and reader at Oxford University 1954–1987. During 1948, Sweeting became a PhD candidate and wrote her thesis based on The Landforms of the Carboniferous Limestone of Ingleborough District, N.W. Yorkshire. In 1951, Marjorie Sweeting was appointed as a lecturer and director of studies in Geography at St. Hugh's College, and in 1983 she was named the acting head of the school. Marjorie Sweeting was the first western-geologist to study karsts. The study, research, and analysis she released as a result of this became incredibly popular as her concepts are still expanded and studied by new-coming geologists.

Sweeting served on the Karst Commission of the International Geographical Union, where she came to work on a new project titled Man's Impact on the Karst. Additionally, Sweeting worked with Gordon Warwick in support of the International Speleological Union where she was in charge of the Karst Denudation. Another one of Marjorie's accomplishments in her career was being a leader on an expedition called the “Expedition to Gunung Mulu” from 1977 to 1978. She was the program director for the Landform and Hydrology Survey for the Royal Geographical Society. The expedition was held to observe speeds of erosion and how quickly land was being formed in a forest of equatorial conditions. Much of Sweeting's early work was focused on the shape of karst landforms, the geological control, and landscape denudation rates. In addition, using her previous interest in rates, she helped establish the importance of mineralogy when controlling weather rates, assisting in field studies and analysis in Jamaica and Puerto Rico. Her book, Karst Landforms (Macmillan 1972), contained the synthesis of her extensive travels, her and her research students' work, and her collaborations and discussions with the major researchers in the field of limestone studies. The book is considered a benchmark of its time in karst studies and is especially influential as China opened up as a region for research after its publication. many people in Britain did not believe in the extravagance of paintings and photographs of the limestone karsts in China prior to Sweeting’s “Expedition to Gunung Mulu” (Sweeting, 1978)

Sweeting published more than seventy books and papers throughout her career, specialising in limestone and karst landscapes in which her travels took her to many sites around the world. These sites include: England, Ireland, Yugoslavia, Jamaica, Svalbard, Tasmania, Australia, Canada, New Zealand, China, Borneo, Malaysia, South Africa, Tibet. Marjorie Sweeting has studied karsts of many different climates on how they are formed and classified them, ranging from sub-polar to humid tropical climates. The limestones were studied in the climates which they frequently appear in such as Australia, where there are larger extents of thick limestone.

After retirement, Marjorie Sweeting continued her research in China which culminated in Karst in China: its Geomorphology and Environment, the manuscript being published posthumously in 1995, shortly after her death. It is the first comprehensive Western account of China's karst, and was especially insightful because of its focus on limestone and varying limestone regions in China—the most important limestone region of the world—that was previously unstudied. While it is an important study of karst formations in China, it has been criticized for not outright debunking the differing opinions of karst and other scientific studies within China. A special issue of ‘Zeitschrift für Geomorphologie’ on ‘Tropical and subtropical karst’ was published in her honour in 1997. Marjorie had written over seventy different publications in her life and was a very well-known and influential geomorphologist of her time.

A major feature of Marjorie Sweeting’s career was her influence on generations of undergraduates and graduates. Many of her weekends and vacation weeks were filled with organized field trips for undergraduates, introducing them to caves and the pleasures of karstic landscapes. Throughout her career at Oxford, she supervised over thirty graduate students, many of whom went on to make valuable contributions to the field of Geology, specifically in karst. Notably, two of Sweeting’s students, Margaret Marker and Gillian E. Groom. Marker, published over 22 works and was granted the Gold Medal of the Society of South African Geographers in 1996. Similarly, Groom made contributions on topics like: the Spitsbergen glaciers, the raised shorelines of Gower, and karst limestone. Like other women in the field of science at the time, academic and career advancement was not as rapid as it was for her male colleagues, and Sweeting exemplifies this as she was never promoted to professor despite her highly distinguished achievements and education.

One of the many articles Sweeting published was Wave-Trough Experiments on Beach Profiles. In 1834, H.R. Palmer was the first person to study the connection between wave frequency and beach configuration. It was hard to distinguish whether the beach profiles were in fact due to wave frequency or just a result from natural conditions. As a result, experiments were performed in the Physical Geography Laboratory of the Cambridge Geography Department. Figure 3 shows the effects of long waves (low frequency) on beach configuration and figure 4 shows the effects of short waves (high frequency) on beach configuration. Sweeting concluded that although many factors affect beach configuration such as the composition of the beach and the angle of which it lays at, frequency of waves does in fact play the biggest role. This is because there is a notable and evident relationship existing between wave action and beach profile. Rock and land configuration are heavily affected by catastrophic and uniform events. The wave model created by Sweeting showcases two beach profiles, destructive and constructive. The latter were high frequency waves and the former due to low. This was a crucial geological finding because using the landscape or configuration of the beach, past events could be revealed. Essentially, the contribution and correspondence of wave frequency with beach profile was incredible research, which enhanced Sweeting’s success in Geology

Marjorie Sweeting officially retired in 1987 at the age of 67 and spent her last seven years with family, friends, and nature. Her title as an accomplished geomorphologist persisted.

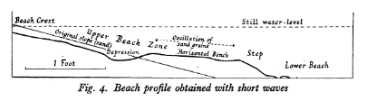
Beach profile obtained with long waves

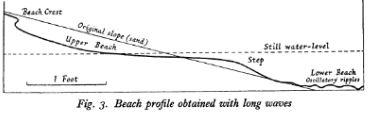
Beach profile obtained with long waves

== Achievements ==
Sweeting contributed largely to the field of karst. Her many awards included those of Gill Memorial Prize of the Royal Geographical Society (1955), Certificate of Merit of the National Speleological Society of America (1959), Honorary Member of the Cave Research Foundation of America (1969), and the Busk Medal (1980).

Sweeting was appointed a C.U.F. University Lectureship in 1953. She was awarded the distinction of a personal readership in 1977.

She obtained numerous awards in her lifetime. Upon passing, she had several dedicated in her honour. These included: Medalist of Palacky University, Czechoslovakia (1973), Honorary Fellow of the National Speleological Society of America (1976), first women to become a Chairman of the British Geomorphological Research Group (1973-1975)

Due to her important and ground-breaking work in the field of geomorphology, The British Society for Geomorphology created "The Marjorie Sweeting Award" in 2008. The award and prize of £200 goes to be the best undergraduate dissertation in the field of geomorphology at any university in the UK. Aaron Wyld won the Marjorie Sweeting award for the best undergraduate geomorphological dissertation. His title awarded to him, “The hypsometry of glaciated mountain ranges with varying uplift and erosion rates.” His work was heavily focused on topography of glacial mountain ranges, similar to Sweeting’s work with landscapes. This showcases the long-lasting effect her legacy had in education, as well as on individuals who share a similar passion for earth sciences.

== Other ==
Unable to continue her studies during World War II, Sweeting went to Denbigh, North Wales as a geography teacher at Howell's School. At the end of the war, she was one of two women, along with Mabel Tomlinson, on the British national committee to advocate for the teaching of geology in high school.

Marjorie used potholing as a way in which to introduce students to karst systems and caving.

From 1977, when she led the initial expedition, Sweeting worked extensively on the karst landforms of China. There was plenty of scope – karst covers about one-seventh of the country, over five hundred thousand square kilometers. This was the first study of the karst regions of China by a western geomorphologist.

For much of her career, Marjorie was one of only a small group of female physical geographers in Britain who fought hard and successfully to establish their international scientific reputation.

Her father, George Scotland Sweeting, heavily fueled and directed Marjorie’s passion for geology as he himself was an ardent geologist. He lectured at the Imperial College in London, and as stated in Marjorie’s obituary, those close to her revealed she was determined to carry on her father’s legacy. For this reason, she deliberately studied and invested extensive time in geology and wished to be remembered as an earth scientist; a title she indefinitely earned as is evident from her accomplishments.

== See also ==
- Timeline of women in science
