= Hong Kong Philharmonic Society =

Hong Kong Philharmonic Society may refer to:

- Hong Kong Philharmonic Society (1895–1941), the pre-war music society
- Hong Kong Philharmonic Orchestra (1947–present), originally known as the Sino-British Orchestra during 1947–1957
