= Walter Brown (mathematician) =

Scottish mathematician

Walter Brown FRSE (29 April 1886, Glasgow – 14 April 1957, Marandellas, Rhodesia) was a Scottish mathematician and engineer.

== Life ==
The younger son of Hugh A. Brown, a headmaster in Paisley, Walter was educated at Allan Glen's School and then studied at the University of Glasgow (BSc Hons Mathematics and Physics 1907; and BSc Pure Science 1910). He began his career as a teacher at Allan Glen's. Brown became a member of the Edinburgh Mathematical Society in March 1911.

In 1914 he took up the post of Lecturer in Engineering at Hong Kong University. He was soon promoted to become Professor in Pure and Applied Mathematics, a post he held from 1918 to 1946.

In 1920 he was elected an Associate Member of the Institution of Electrical Engineers. In 1923 he was elected a Fellow of the Royal Society of Edinburgh. His proposers were Andrew Gray, George Alexander Gibson, John Walter Gregory, John Gordon Gray and Dugald McQuistan.

He was President of the Hong Kong Philharmonic Society, and a member of the Hong Kong English Association, the Hong Kong Sino-British Association, and the Hong Kong Institute of Engineers and Shipbuilders.

A member of the Royal Naval Volunteer Reserve, Brown was captured when Hong Kong surrendered to the Japanese, and he was held as a Prisoner of War at Stanley Camp (1941–45). He organised study groups in the internment camp, and helped attend to the medical needs of the prisoners.

Returning to Scotland after the war, he taught civil and mechanical engineering at the Royal Technical College in Glasgow (1946–47), and mathematics at the University of Glasgow (1947–48).

He travelled extensively and died in Marandellas in Rhodesia (now Zimbabwe) in April 1957.
