= George Macdonald Urquhart =

Scottish veterinarian (1925–1997)

- Born: 29 May 1925; Glasgow, Scotland
- Died: 11 January 1997 (aged 71); Scotland
- Occupations: Veterinarian, university professor, researcher
- Known for: Dictol vaccine

Academic background
- Education: Glasgow Veterinary College; University of Glasgow School of Veterinary Medicine
- Thesis: Experimental Fascioliasis in the Rabbit (1956)

Academic work
- Discipline: Veterinary medicine
- Sub-discipline: veterinary parasitology
- Institutions: University of Glasgow School of Veterinary Medicine; International Trypanotolerance Centre

George Macdonald Urquhart FRSE FRCVS (29 May 1925 – 11 January 1997) was a Scottish veterinarian and professor of veterinary parasitology at the University of Glasgow School of Veterinary Medicine from 1970 to 1990. He helped create the first commercial vaccine for a parasitic disease in cattle. Under his leadership in the field, the university gained an international reputation for veterinary parasitology.

== Early life ==
Urquhart was born in Glasgow, Scotland. He was the son of a farmer in Easter Ross. He was educated at Allan Glen's School where he won a scholarship. In 1942 he entered the Glasgow Veterinary College, graduating BVMS in 1947. For his academic successes, he won the Donald Campbell Memorial Prize and the gold medal for being "the most distinguished student in his year."

== Career ==
After college, Urquhart received a scholarship to work with Dr. E. L. Taylor in Weybridge for the Ministry of Agriculture in the parasitology department from 1947 to 1949.

From 1949 to 1956, he worked as an assistant, then lecturer, at Glasgow University, helping it absorb the Glasgow Veterinary College. He received a PhD from the university in 1955 for his work on diseases caused by liver flukes. His thesis was named Experimental Fascioliasis in the Rabbit.

From 1956 to 1959, he worked in Kabete in Kenya as a veterinary helminthologist. He returned to Glasgow University as a researcher in 1960, becoming a reader in veterinary parasitology in 1968.

At the University of Glasgow, he was a professor in experimental veterinary parasitology from 1970 to 1979. Next, he served there as a professor of veterinary parasitology from 1979 to 1990. He became the first and only chair of veterinary parasitology in the United Kingdom in 1979.

In the 1950s, he was responsible for developing the Dictol vaccine which combats bronchitis in cattle, along with a team consisting of Bill Jarrett, Frank Jennings, Ian McIntyre, and Bill Mulligan. This was the first successful vaccine for parasitic disease in cattle and was eventually sold commercially, becoming the largest selling biologic product for farm animals in the United Kingdom.

Urquhart retired in 1990. He then became the director general of the International Trypanotolerance Centre in The Gambia.

== Publications ==
- Veterinary Parasitology. Longman Scientific and Technical. 1987. ISBN 9780582026995. OCLC 824632303.

== Professional affiliations ==
Urquhart was elected a fellow of the Royal Society of Edinburgh in 1990. His proposers were Ronald J. Roberts, William Weipers, Maxwell Murray and N. G. Wright. He was president of the World Association for the Advancement of Veterinary Parasitology from 1985 to 1989. He was also an honorary member of the British Society of Parasitology and an honorary fellow of the Royal College of Veterinary Surgeons.

== Personal life ==
Urquhart was married to Margaret. Their children were Andrew, Libby, and David. They lived in Helensburgh, Scotland where he enjoyed sailing. He died on 11 January 1997.
