= Andrew Davidson (knight) =

Academic, footballer, knight, public health official, royal physician and soldier

Sir Andrew Davidson FRCPE FRCSE

Chief Medical Officer for Scotland
- In office 1941–1954
- Preceded by: J. M. Mackintosh
- Succeeded by: Kenneth Cowan

Personal details
- Born: 12 March 1892 Dalmuir
- Died: 13 March 1962 (aged 70)
- Spouse: Helen Edith Calder (m. 1922)
- Children: two sons
- Parent: Charles Davidson (father)
- Education: Allan Glen's School; University of Glasgow
Association football career
- Position: Left-half
Senior career*
Years	Team	Apps	(Gls)
- Rutherglen Glencairn
1913–1914	Celtic	5	(0)
1913	→ Vale of Atholl (loan)		
1914	→ Wishaw Thistle (loan)		
1914–1916	St Mirren	48	(1)
1916–1917	South Shields		
1919–1920	Glasgow University		
- * Club domestic league appearances and goals
- Military career
- Allegiance: United Kingdom
- Service: British Army
- Service years: 1916–1919
- Rank: Captain
- Unit: Royal Army Medical Corps
- Conflicts: First World War

Sir Andrew Davidson (12 March 1892 –13 March 1962) was an academic, footballer, public health official, royal physician and soldier. He was knighted in 1946.

There are five photographic portraits by Walter Stoneman in the National Portrait Gallery.
