= James Blacklock Henderson =

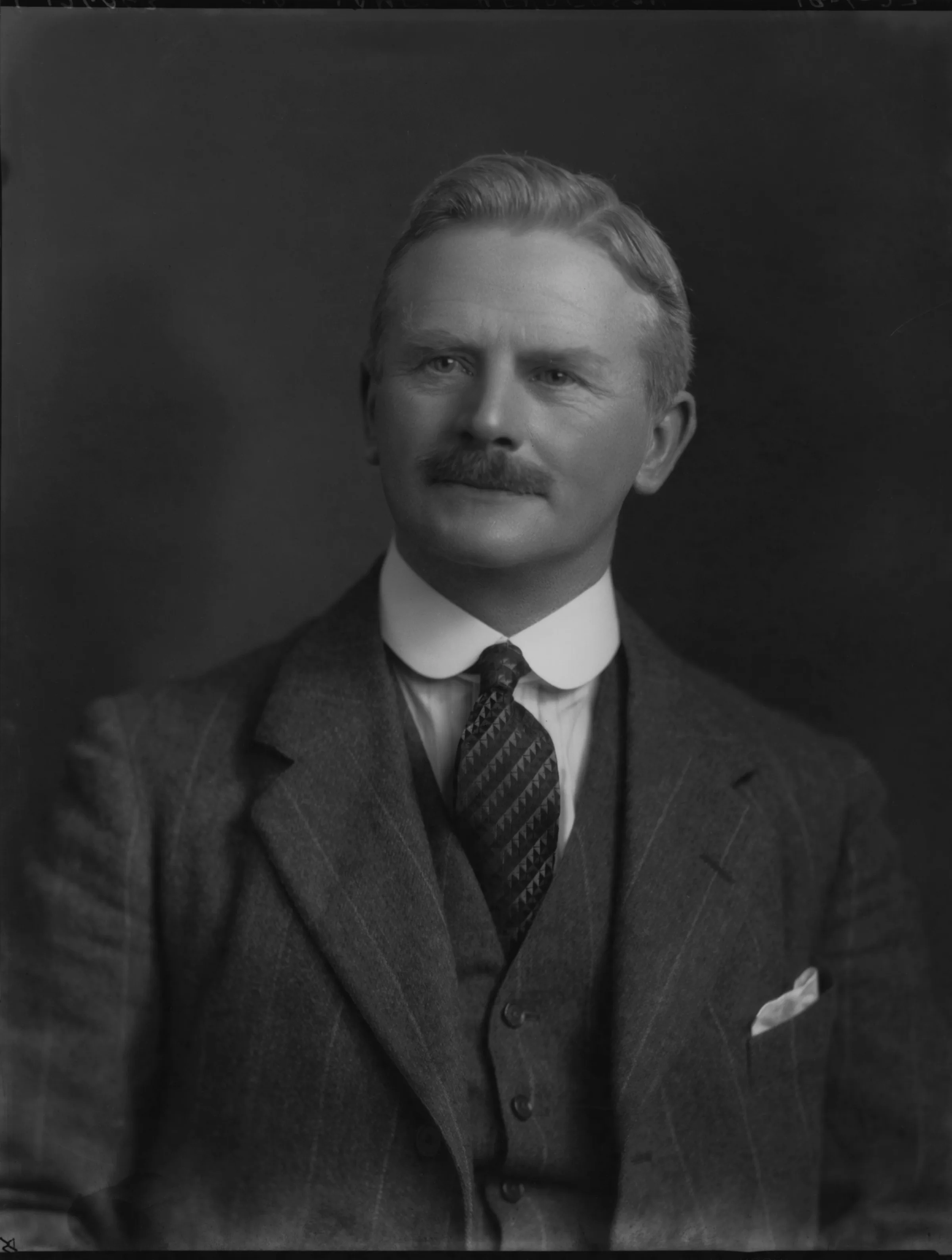
Henderson in 1927

Sir James Blacklock Henderson GCVO (5 March 1871 – 7 April 1950) was a Scottish inventor, naval architect, and professor of applied mechanics.

Born the eldest son of James Henderson, headmaster of Whitehall School, Glasgow, James B. Henderson was educated by his father and at Allan Glen's School in Glasgow and then at the University of Glasgow and the University of Berlin.

From 1894 to 1898, he was a lecturer in physics at Yorkshire College, Leeds. From 1898 to 1901, he was head of the scientific department at Barr and Stroud, Glasgow. In 1898, he married Annie Margaret Henderson.

From 1901 to 1905, he was a lecturer on electrical engineering and a university assistant in engineering at Glasgow University. In 1905, he was appointed a Professor of Applied Mechanics at the Royal Naval College, Greenwich. He was the author of many scientific papers published in the Proceedings of the Royal Society and several other academic journals.

His knighthood was announced on 1 January 1920 and conferred at Buckingham Palace on 25 June 1920. He was an Invited Speaker of the ICM in 1924 at Toronto.

For several years he was Professor of Applied Mechanics at the Royal Naval College, Greenwich. He was also the inventor of many improvements in gunnery used by the Royal Navy. Post-WWI: Awarded £12,500 by the Royal Commission on Awards to Inventors for improvements in optical instruments for use on oscillating platforms.

It was in connection with work on improving the steering of torpedoes that Sir James B. Henderson introduced the idea of 'check helm.' He was granted a patent in 1913 for an automatic steering device, in which the control action was dependent both on the deviation from the course and the rate of change of deviation. The basis of the invention was a constrained gyroscope used to measure the angular velocity of the ship, for which Henderson had been granted a secret patent in 1907. ...

In 1928, Henderson was nominated a member of the Second Class of The Order of the Sacred Treasure of Japan for his part in training Japanese naval officers at Greenwich. This was noted in 'The Collected Papers of William Burnside Vol 1., who was nominated at the same time.
