= Francis Garden, Lord Gardenstone =

Scottish lawyer and judge

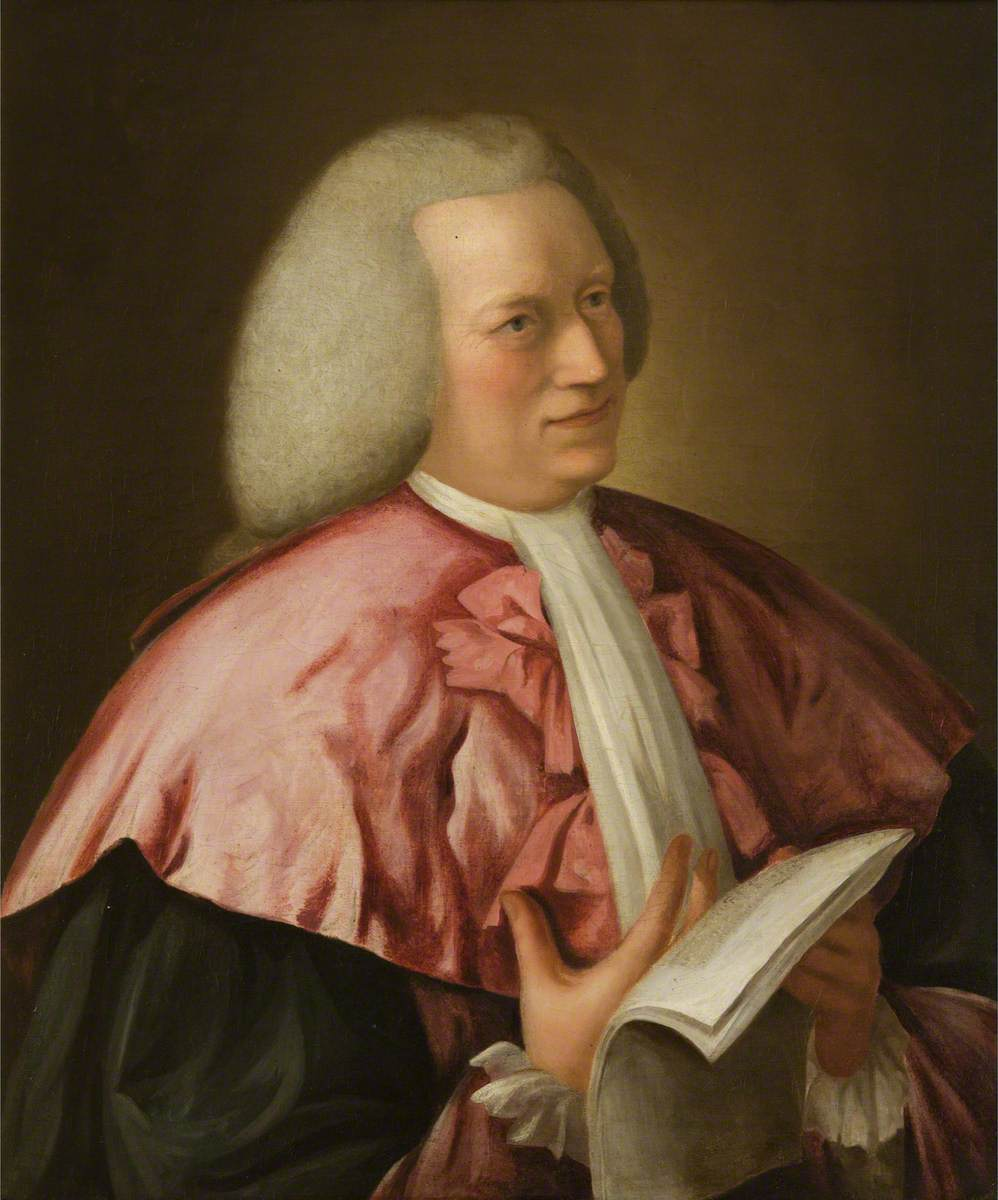
Portrait of Francis Garden, Lord Gardenstone [1721-1793], half-length, in judicial robes, painted by Tilly Kettle.

Francis Garden, Lord Gardenstone of Troup FRSE FSA (24 June 1721 – 22 July 1793) was a Scottish lawyer and judge. He was joint Solicitor General for Scotland from 1760 to 1764, when he became a Senator of the College of Justice.

== Early life ==
Garden was born in Edinburgh on 24 June 1721. He was the second son of Alexander Garden of Troup, Banffshire, by Jean or Jane Grant, eldest daughter of judge Sir Francis Grant, later Lord Cullen. His elder brother was Alexander Garden.

He was educated at Edinburgh University, and was passed the Scottish Bar as an advocate on 14 July 1744.

== Career ==
In 1745, while serving as a volunteer under Sir John Cope, he narrowly escaped being hanged as a spy at Musselburgh Bridge.

In 1748 he was appointed sheriff-depute of Kincardineshire, and on 22 August 1759 was elected one of the assessors to the magistrates of Edinburgh.

On 30 April 1760 Garden was appointed with Sir James Montgomery, Bt as joint Solicitor General for Scotland, but to neither of them was conceded the privilege of sitting within the bar (Cat. of Home Office Papers, 1760–5, pp. 54, 55–6). Garden was employed in the Douglas cause, and appeared before the chambre criminelle of the parliament of Paris, where he was opposed by Wedderburn, and greatly distinguished himself by his legal knowledge and the fluency of his French.

In 1762 he purchased the estate of Johnstone in Kincardineshire. He then began the improvement of the estate, including the enlargement of the village of Laurencekirk.

He was appointed an ordinary lord of session in the place of George Sinclair, Lord Woodhall, and took his seat on the bench on 3 July 1764 with the title of Lord Gardenstone. On the resignation of James Ferguson, Lord Pitfour in April 1776, Garden also became a lord of justiciary, a post from which he retired in 1787, with a pension of £200 a year.

In 1784 he was living in a newly built house at Shakespeare Square, at the east end of the then newly constructed Princes Street.

Upon the death of his elder brother Alexander in 1785, Garden succeeded to the family estates in Banffshire and Aberdeenshire, as well as to a large fortune. In September 1786 he went abroad for the sake of his health, returning in the summer of 1788. In 1790 he was elected a Fellow of the Royal Society of Edinburgh.

He continued to hold the post of an ordinary lord of session until his death at Morningside House in Morningside, south Edinburgh, on 22 July 1793. He was buried in Greyfriars Kirkyard on 24 July, ‘one and a half double paces north of the corner of Henderson's tomb,’ but there is no stone to mark the exact spot. Henderson's tomb is a cubic style monument west of the church and north of the large Adam mausoleum.

== Legacy ==
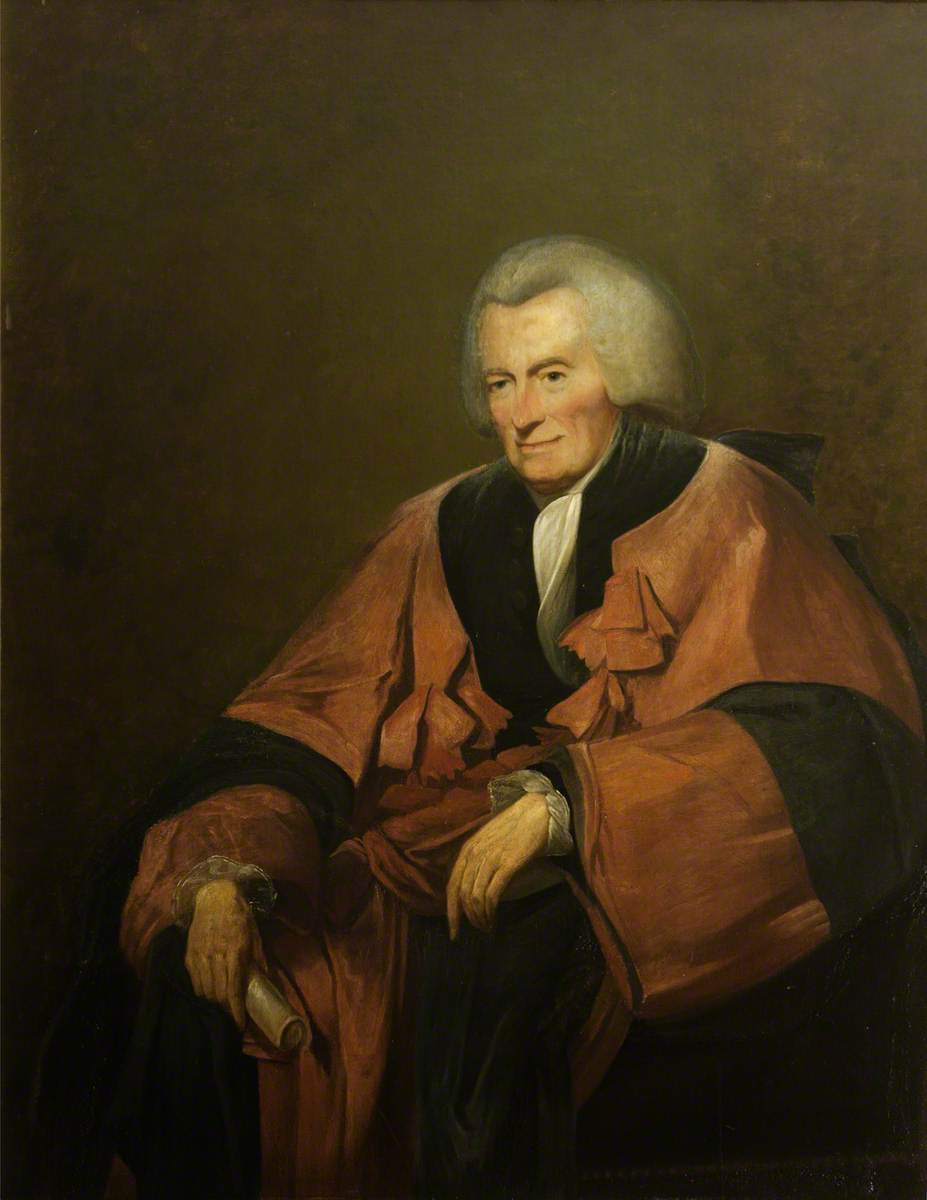
Portrait of Francis Garden, Lord Gardenstone [1721-1793], three-quarter-length seated, in judicial robes, painted by Henry Raeburn.

Garden was a man of many peculiarities, one of which was a fondness for pigs. It is related that a visitor one morning called on Garden, but he was not yet out of bed. He was shown into his bedroom, and in the dark he stumbled over something which gave a grunt. Upon which Lord Gardenstone said, "It is just a bit sow, poor beast, and I laid my breeches on it to keep it warm all night". His convivial habits during his early career at the bar formed the subject of many anecdotes. Tytler wrote that Garden, "an acute and able lawyer, of great natural eloquence, and with much wit and humour, had a considerable acquaintance with classical and elegant literature".

In 1762 Garden purchased the estate of Johnson at Laurencekirk, Kincardineshire, and in 1765 began to build a new village, in 1779 erected into a burgh of barony. At the time of his death the village contained 500 houses, with a population of 1200. To encourage settlers in it he offered land on easy terms, and built an inn. He also founded a library and a museum for the use of the villagers, and did his best to establish manufacturing in the district. His Memorandums concerning the Village of Lawrence Kirk are in an appendix to John Knox's Tour through the Highlands of Scotland, 1787. In May 1789 he erected at his own expense a Doric temple over St. Bernard's Well, near Edinburgh, where he took the waters. He never married. There were two portraits of him at Troup House, Banffshire, in the possession of Francis William Garden-Campbell, and a characteristic etching of him on horseback by Kay.

== Works ==
- Letter to the Inhabitants of Lawrence Kirk, 1780.
- Travelling Memorandums, made in a Tour upon the Continent of Europe in the Years 1786, 1787, and 1788. Vol. i., Edinburgh, 1791; vol. ii., Edinburgh, 1792. Vol. iii. was published after his death, and contains a short memoir of the author, Edinburgh, 1795. A second edition of vols. i. and ii. appeared at Edinburgh in 1792.
- Garden also had a hand in Miscellanies in Prose and Verse, Edinburgh, 1791; second edit., corrected and enlarged, Edinburgh, 1792.

Legal offices
Preceded by Thomas Miller of Glenlee	Solicitor General for Scotland; 1760–1764; With: Sir James Montgomery, Bt	Succeeded by Sir James Montgomery, Bt
