= Jack McLean (journalist) =

Scottish journalist (1946–2023)

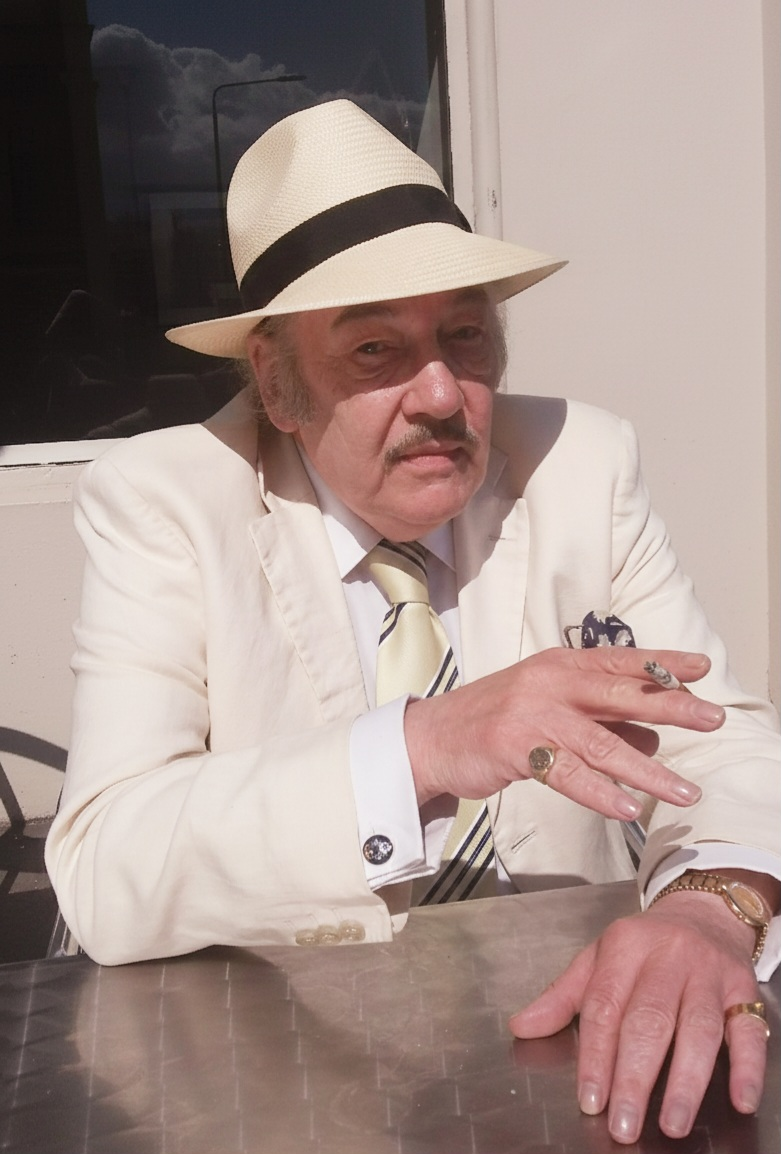
- Jack McLean in May 2018
- Born: 10 August 1946
- Died: 27 December 2023 (aged 77)
- Citizenship: Scottish
- Occupations: Journalist, columnist

Jack McLean (10 August 1946 – 27 December 2023) was a Scottish journalist, and columnist with The Herald. McLean was known as "the Urban Voltaire", a tag given to him by one of his editors.

== Early life ==
McLean was born prematurely in Irvine, Ayrshire. Weighing slightly over two pounds at birth, his survival was in doubt. McLean attributed his survival to the efforts of his mother, who suffered renal failure during his birth, and a Soviet doctor who introduced an incubation tent that helped keep him alive.

He spent a lot of time with his grandmother in Stevenston, where he learned to read at an early age, devouring Chatterbox Annuals, which sparked his lifelong love for literature and storytelling.

McLean’s father, a soldier who had served in the Royal Corps of Signals during the war, returned to a civilian life in Glasgow, where he worked as a school janitor. The family lived in Cathcart, before relocating to Townhead in the 1950s, a move to a more working-class environment that deeply influenced Jack's perspective on social class and urban life.

== Career ==
=== Early writing and entry into journalism ===
McLean first began writing columns for the Times Educational Supplement in the 1970s, focusing on his experiences as a teacher. He became known to education correspondents during a period of significant industrial unrest in Scottish education, including student campaigns, college occupations, and the teachers’ dispute associated with the Houghton Agreement. McLean's exposure to these events brought him into contact with key figures such as John Pirie and Harry Reid.

In the 1980s, McLean transitioned to writing columns for the Glasgow Herald, where he gained prominence for his insightful and sometimes controversial commentary. A brief move to The Scotsman in 1998 did not last, and McLean returned to The Herald, where he continued to write extensively. He also contributed to the Glasgow Evening Times, establishing himself as a leading voice in Scottish journalism.

=== Herald era and influence ===
During his decades at The Herald (and sister publications), McLean became prominent columnist. Obituaries published at his death described him as a “Herald writer who captured the soul of Glasgow.” Another called him a “flamboyant writer” whose regular column “often touched raw nerves and lit up the letters page.”

McLean’s writing for the Herald combined social commentary, city‑centre observation, and a conversational style rooted in Glasgow working‑class vernacular. According to media‑studies commentary, his presence contributed to defining a distinct Herald tradition of column writing in the 1980s and 1990s. That style tended to emphasise local identity, humour, and an informal but often sharp social analysis.

Among the subjects McLean supported in his columns was women’s football: at a time when many mainstream sports pages disregarded the women’s game, his coverage in the Herald/Evening Times was described after his death as “early and enthusiastic”.

McLean continued to contribute to various publications into his 70s. He occasionally provided articles for the journal Scottish Review and took part in public events, speaking on subjects ranging from Scottish politics to social issues and the changing cityscape of Glasgow. In 2014, he featured in the BBC programme I Belong to Glasgow, where he revisited his memories of growing up in the city. He appeared in the 2021 BBC documentary The Hunt for Bible John, relating to the Glasgow dance‑hall murders.

=== Levison Inquiry ===
At the Leveson Inquiry in 2011 he was criticised for his writing about the 1991 murder of Diane Watson by Barbara Glover (both schoolgirls), in which he had portrayed the victim as a bully. The Herald later issued a formal apology to the family.

=== Books ===
During his career McLean collected many of his newspaper columns into compact, book‑format volumes that brought his distinct “Urban Voltaire” voice to a reading public beyond the daily press. His 1990 volume The Bedside Urban Voltaire gathered a selection of his most vivid and characteristic pieces from the Glasgow Herald and related papers. This book mixed humour, city‑life observation, social commentary and the everyday drama of working‑class Glasgow. A year later he followed this with More Bedside Urban Voltaire, which offered additional material in the same vein. These books were a retrospective distillation of McLean's sharp wit, anecdotal richness, and a rooted sense of place.

In 1996 McLean published his autobiography, Hopeless But Not Serious: The Autobiography of the Urban Voltaire, which expanded his collected columns with new memoir writing and offered a fuller account of his childhood, family background, education and early journalistic development.

In 2007 McLean released The Compendium of Nosh (An A–Z of Food), a book that combined playful commentary and encyclopaedic entries on dishes, ingredients and food customs. This work drew on Mclean's lifelong interest in Glasgow’s social life and his flair for light cultural observation. He also contributed to the literary heritage of Glasgow, writing the preface in 2011 for a new edition of The Heart of Glasgow (originally 1965) by local writer Jack House.

== Personal life ==
Educated at Allan Glen's School, McLean worked for 20 years as a secondary school art teacher, but was dismissed for assaulting a pupil, as he later recounted in his column.

McLean was a well-known resident of Glasgow's South Side, where he lived for over 35 years, and where he could often be found in the pubs along the Pollokshaws Road.

He died on 27 December 2023, at the age of 77. After his death, tributes were paid by Nicola Sturgeon and others.
