= Walter Wilson Stothers =

British mathematician

Walter Wilson Stothers (8 November 1946 – 16 July 2009) was a British mathematician who proved the Stothers-Mason Theorem (Mason-Stothers theorem) in the early 1980s.

He was the third and youngest son of a family doctor in Glasgow and a mother, who herself had graduated in mathematics in 1927. He attended Allan Glen's School, a secondary school in Glasgow that specialised in science education, and where he was Dux of the School in 1964. From 1964 to 1968 he was a student in the Science Faculty of the University of Glasgow graduating with a First Class Honours degree.

In September 1968 he married Andrea Watson before beginning further studies at Peterhouse, Cambridge from which he had received a "Jack Scholarship".

Under the supervision of Peter Swinnerton-Dyer, Stothers studied for a Ph.D. in Number theory at the University of Cambridge from 1968 to 1971. He obtained his doctorate in 1972 with a Ph.D. thesis entitled "Some Discrete Triangle Groups".

His main achievement was proving the Stothers-Mason theorem (also known as the Mason-Stothers theorem) in 1981. This is an analogue of the well-known abc conjecture for integers: indeed it was the inspiration for the latter. Later independent proofs were given by R. C. Mason in 1983 in the proceedings of a 1982 colloquium and again in 1984 and by Umberto Zannier in 1995.
