= Mabel Tomlinson =

British geologist and teacher (1893 – 1978)

Mabel Elizabeth Tomlinson FGS (1893 – 1978) was an English geologist and teacher. She published on the geological history of the Avon Valley, and was an influential geology teacher who supported the teaching of geology in schools.

== Early life and education ==
She was born in Polesworth, North Warwickshire in 1893 to two teachers at Polesworth School, Frederick and Hannah Tomlinson. Her father (the headmaster) appointed himself geography teacher and led geological expeditions. Educated at Polesworth School, Mabel gained a BA in Combined Arts from the University of Birmingham in 1916. She later returned there to gain a BSc in Geology.

== Teaching ==
In 1917, Tomlinson began teaching at Yardley Grammar School, Birmingham, where she would continue to teach until 1959. She and her father accompanied the school when it was evacuated to Lydney in World War II. She introduced geology to the school as a subject in 1943 and was promoted to Senior Mistress and Deputy Head in 1954. At the school, she was affectionately known as 'Doc Tom.' Former students commented on her enthusiasm for the subject resulting in many 'Yardleians' going on to a career in geology. Her students included Keeper of Palaeontology Harold Ball; Walter Mykura; Keith O'Nions; and Chris Sands, who became one of her successors.

In the early 1940s, Tomlinson drew up the syllabus for a geology course for the Higher School Certificate, and was on the national committee introducing it onto school curricula. She continued to promote the teaching of geology in schools, giving reports on it to the British Association in 1949 and 1962.

== Geological research ==
Alongside her teaching job, Mabel carried out research on the geological history of the Avon, carrying out fieldwork on bicycle trips. Her work was submitted for the degrees of MSc (1923) and DSc (1936). She gave her first paper to the Geological Society in 1924, the year after she was admitted as a Fellow. One of her most significant papers came in 1925 when she established a relative chronology for the valley's glacial deposits based on river terraces, and correlated the Pleistocene deposits of the Avon with some in the east of England.

The Geological Society granted Mabel the Lyell Fund in 1927 and the R.H. Worth Prize in 1961. She gave the Henry Stopes lecture that year.

== Death and legacy ==
Mabel died in September 1978. In 2004–5, the Tomlinson-Brown Trust was established in the name of Mabel and her successor Geoff Brown by their former students to promote young people’s awareness of earth sciences.
