= John McCallum (naval architect) =

Scottish naval architect

John (Ian) McCallum (13 Oct 1920 – 15 Feb 1995) was a Scottish naval architect. He was the Chief Ship Designer for the Queen Elizabeth the Second liner, which was built by John Brown & Company where he was also Technical Director. He also became the Chief Ship Surveyor of Lloyd's Register of shipping (1970–81).

McCallum was born on 13 October 1920, to parents Hugh Beith McCallum (Engineer and Old Contemptible) and Agnes Falconer Wood McCallum (née Walker). He was Educated at Allan Glen's School in Glasgow and at the University of Glasgow, graduating with a First Class degree in Naval Architecture.

McCallum was subsequently apprenticed to John Brown & Co, Clydebank, between 1938 and 1943. He became Junior Lecturer in Naval Architecture at the University of Glasgow during 1943–44. In 1944 he began a long period with Lloyd's Register, first in Newcastle upon Tyne in 1944, Glasgow in 1949 and London in 1953. He was Lloyd's Chief Ship Surveyor from 1970 until his retirement in 1981.
