= John Arnold Cranston =

British research chemist (1891–1972)

John Arnold Cranston FRSE FRIC LLD (15 August 1891 – 25 April 1972) was a British research chemist. He is credited with the development of isotopes and also the co-discovery of protactinium (element 91). However, this credit was claimed by others, not himself directly, and only caused controversy in the scientific world after the publishing of his obituary.

== Life ==
He was born on Yangtse-Poo Road in Shanghai in China on 15 August 1891 the son of David Cranston (1848–1938), a water engineer, and Marion Auld. He attended Allan Glen's School in Glasgow and then Glasgow University where he continued at postgraduate level, obtaining a doctorate (DSc).

He worked with Frederick Soddy as a researcher until interrupted by the First World War. In 1915, he locked up his laboratory and notes and went to join the Royal Scots Fusiliers in France, and was attached to the Royal Engineers specialising in training in gas warfare, and rising to the rank of captain. On his return in 1918, Soddy went to Aberdeen University. Cranston then published their notes on isotopes, including the new element, Protactinium. However, although they claimed this discovery to have been made in 1915, they were usurped in any acclaim as German scientists had by 1918 already come to the same conclusions. He then took a role as senior lecturer in chemistry at the Royal College of Science and Technology in Glasgow where he stayed until retirement in 1957. The college is now known as Strathclyde University.

He was elected a Fellow of the Royal Society of Edinburgh in 1966. His proposers were Lord Alexander Fleck, Peter Pauson, John Monteath Robertson. Manfred Gordon and Patrick Dunbar Ritchie.

He died on 25 April 1972 at the Southern General Hospital in Glasgow.

== Publications ==
- The Structure of Matter (1924)
- Symbols and Formulae in Chemistry (1928)
- The Discovery of Isotopes by Soddy and his School in Glasgow (1958)

== Family ==
He was married to Helen Paton Scott (1891–1968). They had four sons and a daughter: David Scott Cranston, Helen Scott Cranston, William Weir Cranston, Dennis Mitchell Cranston and John Paton Cranston.
