= John Vernon Harrison =

British structural geologist, explorer and cartographer

John Vernon Harrison FRSE FGS (1892-1972) was a British structural geologist, explorer and cartographer.

== Life ==
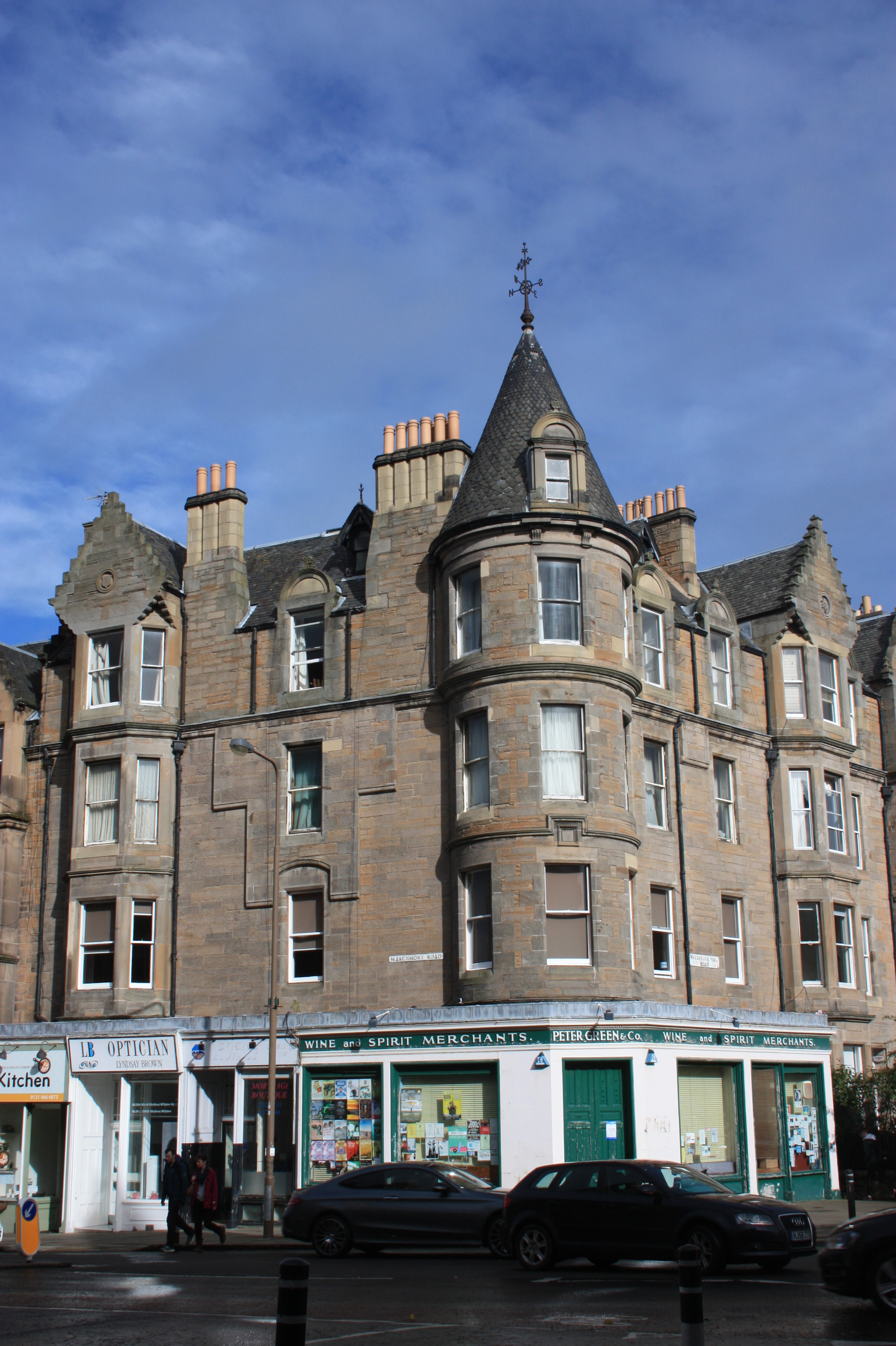
37 Warrender Park Road, Edinburgh

He was born to British parents in Bloemfontein in the Orange Free State on 16 March 1892. His father was John Frederick Harrison, a civil engineer. His family returned to Scotland in his early childhood, living at a flat at 37 Warrender Park Road in Marchmont in Edinburgh and he here attended George Watson's College. Moving to Glasgow around 1905 the family lived first at 32 Hamilton Park Terrace and then 34 Rowallan Gardens in Partick, a pleasant terraced house. In Glasgow he attended Allan Glen's School. In 1910 he began studying Science at Glasgow University. He won many prizes including the Joseph Black Medal and George Roger Muirhead Prize for Chemistry. He was particularly influenced by his Geology teacher, Prof John Walter Gregory. He graduated BSc with distinction in 1914.

His first employment after graduation was as an explosives chemist. Despite this apparent appropriate role his inexperience led him to more standard service during the First World War, during which he served as a lieutenant in the Royal Engineers in Mesopotamia. In 1918 he was transferred to the Anglo-Persian Oil Company to work as a geologist in relation to fuel supplies. He remained in this role after the war ended, working mainly in Persia and Iraq, and being responsible for sourcing many of the oil-fields still in production today. During this period he also mapped an area of 30,000 square miles in the Zagros Mountain Range. In the 1930s he was in great demand from China to South America. In 1938 Oxford University offered him a post lecturing in Structural Geology, being seen as the foremost expert in his field. In 1931 Glasgow University awarded him an honorary doctorate (DSc). In 1934 he was elected a Fellow of the Royal Society of Edinburgh. His proposers were John Smith Flett, Edward Battersby Bailey, Murray Macgregor, and William McLintock.

He enlisted in the Army Reserves at the outset of the Second World War and was called up to work as a geologist for the Admiralty in 1943.

In 1961 the Geological Society of London had awarded him their Lyell Medal for outstanding contributions to geology.

He retired in 1959 and died in Oxford on 30 July 1972.

== Family ==
He married Janet Mitchell Marr Dingwall (d.1971), a fellow geologist, in 1939.

== Publications ==
- A Geological Map of the Amazon Basin (1957)
