= Thomas Phemister =

Scottish geologist (1902–1982)

Professor Thomas Phemister FRSE FGS

Professor of Geology and Mineralogy, University of Aberdeen
- In office 1937–1972

Personal details
- Born: Thomas Crawford Phemister; 25 May 1902 Glasgow, Scotland
- Died: 30 December 1982 (aged 80)
- Occupation: Geologist

Thomas Crawford Phemister (25 May 1902 – 30 December 1982) was a Scottish geologist.

== Life ==
He was born in Glasgow, Scotland on 25 May 1902 the son of John Clark Phemister (b.1858) and his wife, Elizabeth Galbraith Crawford. He was the younger brother of James Phemister. He was educated at Allan Glen's School in Glasgow. He studied geology at Glasgow University then went to the University of Chicago where he obtained a postgraduate MSc, then in 1926 began lecturing as an associate professor at the University of British Columbia. He also studied at St John's College, Cambridge, where he received his PhD.

From 1928 to 1930 he was a Field Officer (Geologist) within the Canadian Geological Survey. In 1933 he returned to Britain as a Demonstrator in Mineralogy and Petrology at Cambridge University. In 1937 he was given the Kilgour Chair in Geology at Aberdeen University.

In 1938 he was elected a Fellow of the Royal Society of Edinburgh. His proposers were Thomas James Jehu, Robert Campbell, Murray Macgregor and Ernest Masson Anderson. He served as the Society's vice president from 1968 to 1971.

In the Second World War he served in the Royal Engineers.

He died on 30 December 1982.

== Family ==
In 1926 he married Mary Wood Reid .
