= James Phemister =

20th-century Scottish geologist

James Phemister FRSE FGS FMS
- Born: 3 April 1893; Govan; Scotland
- Died: 18 May 1986 (aged 93); Edinburgh; Scotland
- Education: University of Glasgow
- Spouse: Margaret Clark
- Children: 2 sons and a daughter
- Parents: John Clark Phemister (father); Elizabeth Galbraith Crawford (mother)
- Relatives: Thomas Phemister (brother)
- Scientific career
- Workplaces: British Geological Survey; Geological Museum
- Thesis: A petrological study of the composite alkaline intrusions of north-west Sutherlandshire (1928)

Dr James Phemister FRSE FGS FMS (3 April 1893 – 18 May 1986) was a 20th-century Scottish geologist.

== Life ==
He was born in Govan on 3 April 1893, the son of John Clark Phemister (b.1858) and his wife, Elizabeth Galbraith Crawford. He was the older brother to Thomas Phemister.

He studied mathematics, natural philosophy and geology at Glasgow University graduating MA BSc in 1915. His career was interrupted by the First World War during which he served in the Royal Garrison Artillery. He was severely wounded in 1917.

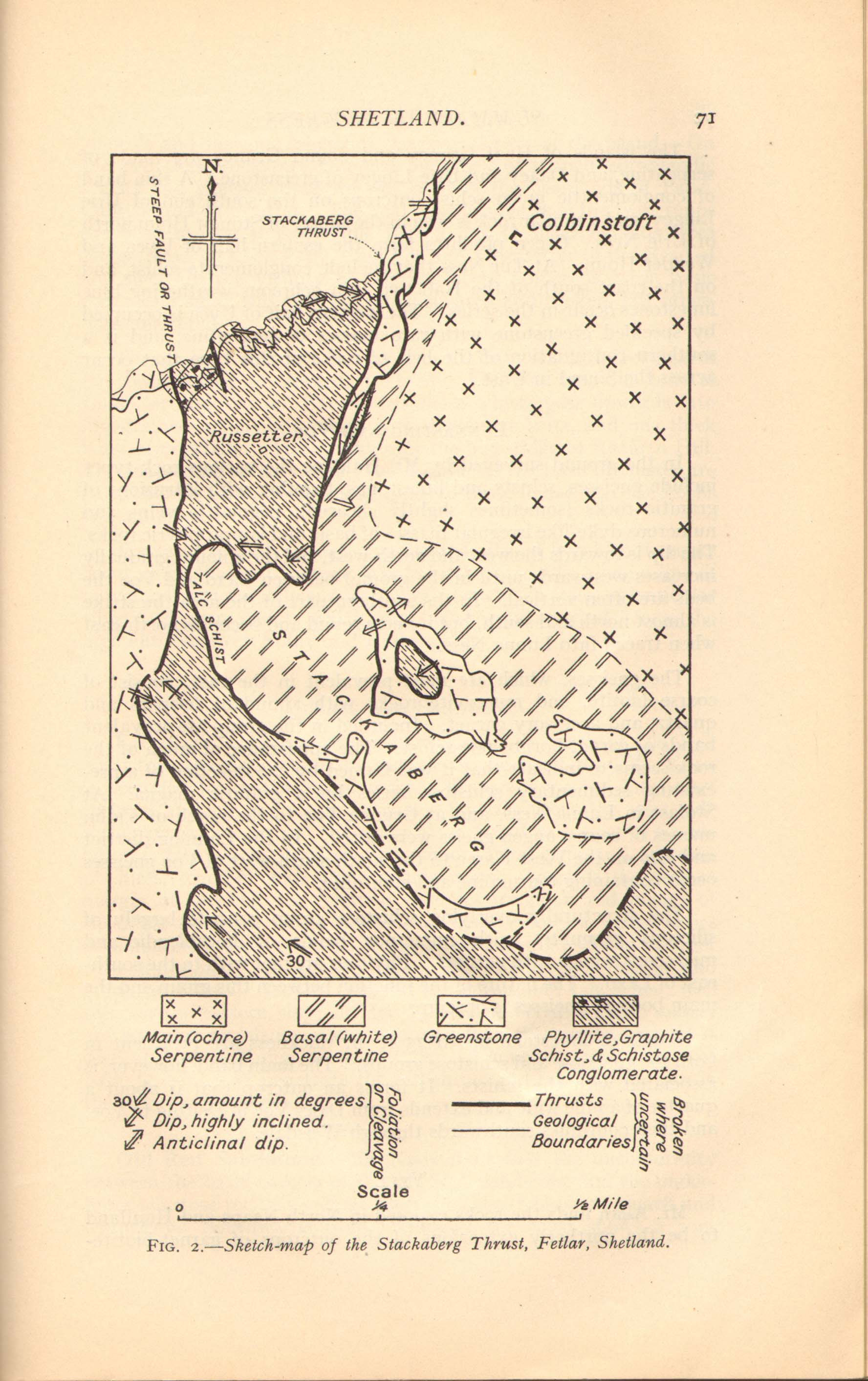
The Stackaberg Thrust, Fetlar, based on work that Phemister carried out in Shetland in 1930

In 1921 he joined the British Geological Survey as a Geologist, mainly working in the Scottish Highlands.

Between 1926 and 1929 he worked in Persia with W. F. P. McLintock, pioneering the use of the gravity torsion balance in oil exploration.

In 1931 he was elected a Fellow of the Royal Society of Edinburgh. His proposers were Murray Macgregor, Sir John Smith Flett, W. F. P. McLintock and Herbert Harold Read. He won the Society's Neill Prize for the period 1959–61.

In 1935 he moved to London as official Petrographer to HM Geological Survey.

In the Second World War he served with the government's Chemist Department, his roles including geological analysis of ballast within the V-1 flying bomb to assess where it might have been launched.

In 1946 he became Assistant Director to HM Geological Survey but gave up the post in 1953 in order to return to Edinburgh, working in the Grange Terrace office with Dr Walter Mykura.

He died in Edinburgh on 18 May 1986.

== Family ==
He was married to Margaret Clark (d.1982). They had two sons and a daughter.

== Selected publications ==
- Phemister, James (1936). Scotland: The Northern Highlands (Report). British Regional Geology. Edinburgh: HMSO. The full text of the Third Edition of this work (1960) is available at "Archive.org". Her Majesty's Stationery Office (HMSO). 1960.
- Kostov, Ivan (1968). Embrey, Peter G.; Phemister, James (eds.). Mineralogy. Translated by Kostov, Ivan. Edinburgh & London: Oliver & Boyd. ISBN 9780050016671. OCLC 42358.
- Mykura, Walter; Phemister, James; Sabine, Peter Aubrey (1976). The geology of Western Shetland: (explanation of One-inch Geological Sheet Western Shetland, comprising Sheet 127 and parts of 125, 126 and 128). Edinburgh: HMSO.
- MacGregor, Malcolm; Phemister, James (1979). Geological Excursion Guide to the Assynt District of Sutherland. Edinburgh: Edinburgh Geological Society. ISBN 978-0-904440-03-4.
