= Luthermuir =

Village in Aberdeenshire, Scotland

Coordinates: 56°48′25″N 2°33′40″W

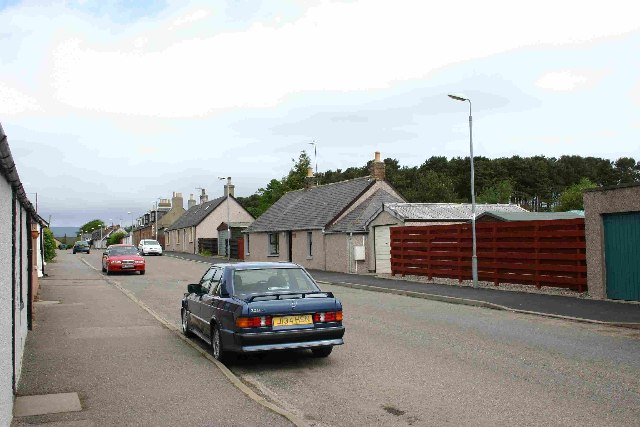
The main street

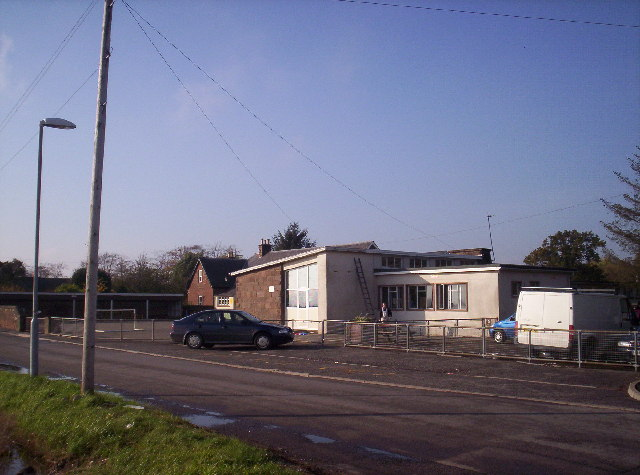
The primary school

Luthermuir is a village in Aberdeenshire, Scotland. In 2022, Aberdeenshire Council estimated the population of Luthermuir to be around 300, with 132 households.

Historically the village was home to weavers and labourers.

== Facilities ==
Luthermuir is home to a primary school and a church. There is a single playground, however, it was deemed unsafe and closed by the council in 2020. Residents are currently raising funds for new play equipment. A registered charity, Luthermuir Hall And Park Committee, is based in the village and aims to improve facilities and meeting places for the benefit of residents of Luthermuir and surrounding places.

== Transportation ==
A bus service connects Luthermuir with Laurencekirk, Auchenblae and Stonehaven. It is situated close to the A90.

== Notable residents ==
Brothers John Souttar and Harry Souttar, both footballers, grew up in the village.
