= Béthencourt-sur-Somme =

- Commune
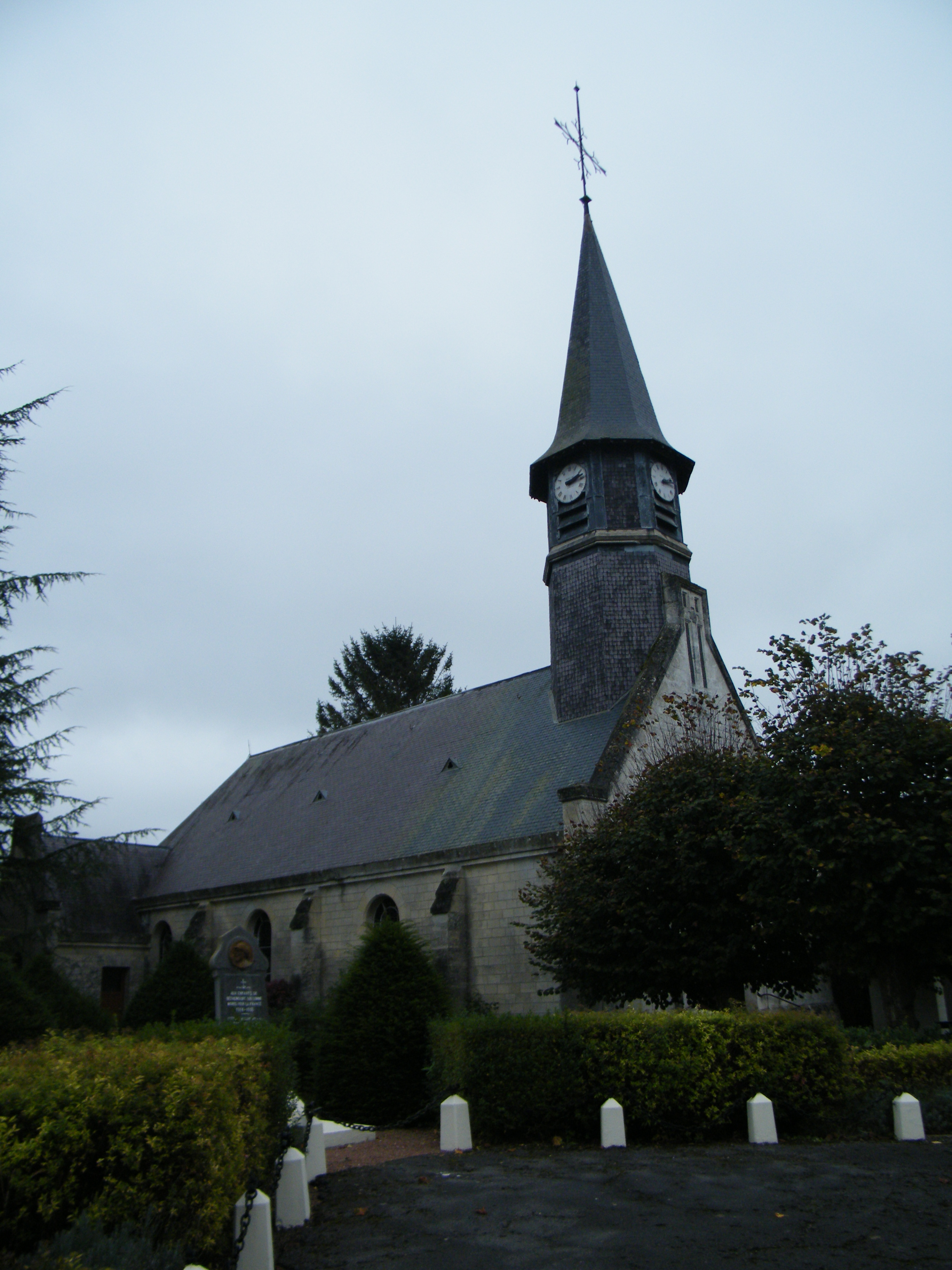
- The church in Béthencourt-sur-Somme

- Coat of arms
- Location of Béthencourt-sur-Somme
- Location within France Location within Hauts-de-France
- Coordinates: 49°47′44″N 2°57′52″E
- Country: France
- Region: Hauts-de-France
- Department: Somme
- Arrondissement: Péronne
- Canton: Ham
- Intercommunality: CC Est de la Somme

Government
  - Mayor (2020–2026): Patricia Poturalski
- Area^{1}: 2.87 km^{2} (1.11 sq mi)
- Elevation: 58 m (190 ft)
- Highest elevation: 83 m (272 ft)
- Lowest elevation: 53 m (174 ft)
- Population (2023): 124
  - Density: 43.2/km^{2} (112/sq mi)
- Time zone: UTC+01:00 (CET)
  - Summer (DST): UTC+02:00 (CEST)
- INSEE/Postal code: 80097 /80190
- ^{1} French Land Register data, which excludes lakes, ponds, glaciers > 1 km^{2} (0.386 sq mi or 247 acres) and river estuaries.

Béthencourt-sur-Somme (French pronunciation: [betɑ̃kuʁ syʁ sɔm], literally Béthencourt on Somme; Picard: Bétencourt-su-Sonme) is a commune in the Somme department in Hauts-de-France in northern France.

== Geography ==
The commune is situated on the D15 and D62 road junction, on the banks of the river Somme, some 16 miles (26 km) west of Saint-Quentin.

== Population ==
Historical population
Year	Pop.	±% p.a.
1968	132	—
1975	118	−1.59%
1982	117	−0.12%
1990	122	+0.52%
1999	110	−1.14%
2007	133	+2.40%
2012	129	−0.61%
2017	129	+0.00%
2023	124	−0.66%
Source: INSEE

== History ==
It was here that King Henry V of England found a crossing point over the Somme on 19 October 1415, just days before the Battle of Agincourt.

== See also ==
- Communes of the Somme department
