= Laurencekirk =

Town in Aberdeenshire, Scotland

Coordinates: 56.83°N 02.46°W

Laurencekirk: Scottish Gaelic: Eaglais Labhrainn/Coinmheadh; Scots: Lowrenkirk
- Location within Aberdeenshire
- Population: 3,140 (2020)
- OS grid reference: NO7171
  - Edinburgh: 67 mi (108 km)
  - London: 380 mi (612 km)
- Council area: Aberdeenshire
- Lieutenancy area: Kincardineshire
- Country: Scotland
- Sovereign state: United Kingdom
- Post town: LAURENCEKIRK
- Postcode district: AB30
- Dialling code: 01561
- Police: Scotland
- Fire: Scottish
- Ambulance: Scottish
- UK Parliament: West Aberdeenshire and Kincardine
- Scottish Parliament: Angus North and Mearns

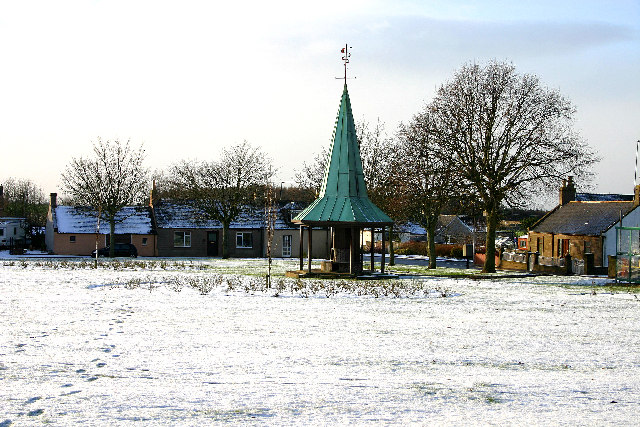
Kinnear Square lies at the south end of Laurencekirk.

Laurencekirk (/ˌlɒrənsˈkɜːrk/, Scots: Lowrenkirk, Scottish Gaelic: Eaglais Labhrainn), locally known as Lournie or simply "The Kirk", is a small town in the historic county of Kincardineshire, Scotland, just off the A90 Dundee to Aberdeen main road. It is administered as part of Aberdeenshire. It is the largest settlement in the Howe o' the Mearns area and houses the local secondary school; Mearns Academy, which was established in 1895 and awarded the Charter Mark in 2003.

Its old name was Conveth, an anglification of the Gaelic Coinmheadh, referring to an obligation to provide free food and board to passing troops. Laurencekirk is in the Howe of the Mearns, a wide valley between the Hill of Garvock and the Cairn O' Mount. The famous landmark of the Johnston Tower can be seen on the peak of the Garvock.

Laurencekirk was, in the past, known for making snuff boxes with a special type of airtight hinge (known as a "Laurencekirk hinge") invented by James Sandy.

The Laurencekirk Golf Club, now defunct, was founded in the early 1900s but by 1951 it had been wound up.

== History ==
=== Parish of Conveth ===
The parish of Conveth is first recorded during the reign of William the Lion with its church dedicated by the Bishop of St Andrews in 1244. The parish church was named Laurence Kirk in honour of either Saint Lawrence or Laurence of Canterbury. A new church building was constructed in 1626.

=== 18 to 19th centuries ===
In 1762, Lord Gardenstone purchased Johnston Estate, the site of the modern village and began a programme of improvement. Prior to this, the settlement consisted of only two or three houses in the vicinity of the kirk and manse. Lord Gardenstone began the construction of a new village in 1765 and encouraged its growth by granting settlers feus on generous terms of only three or four pence. The village grew quickly and by 1810 was home to approximately 600 people. The village's charter was signed in 1781, granting it the status of a burgh of Barony.

Lord Gardenstone also developed the industry of making snuff-boxes in the village with this continuing through the 19th century. He also built a museum next to the village inn to create a tourist attraction.

The 1626 church building was demolished in 1804 to make way for the present building. Some of the stones from the older church were reused in the construction.

=== 20th century to present ===
During the 1908 Kincardineshire by-election campaign, the Women’s Freedom League held a meeting at the Laurencekirk Market Stance as part of a wider campaign by the group to protest the Liberal government's unwillingness to bring in votes for women. Speeches were made by Mary Gawthorpe of the WSPU and Teresa Billington-Greig of the Women’s Freedom League.

Laurencekirk railway station was opened on 1 November 1849 by the Aberdeen Railway, which ran from Aberdeen in the north to Guthrie (just outside Arbroath) to the south. The line joined the North British, Arbroath and Montrose Railway north of Montrose at Kinnaber Junction and Arbroath and Forfar Railway at the triangular junctions at Friockheim and Guthrie.

== Services ==
Laurencekirk has two public houses; The Crown and The Royal.

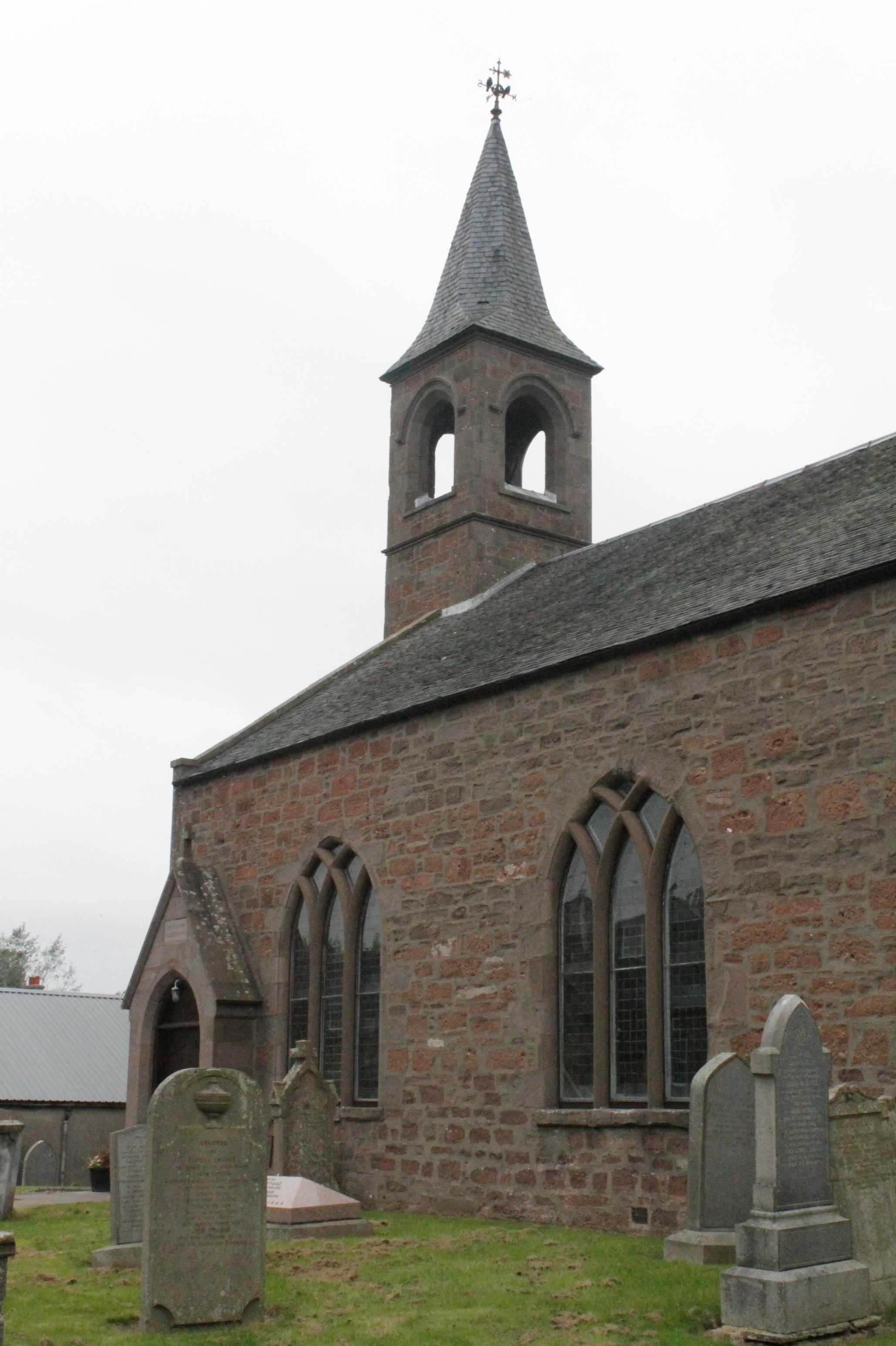
Laurencekirk Parish Church

Laurencekirk Primary School was built in 1999 and Mearns Academy, the senior school, opened in a new building in August 2014, at a cost of £23 million. The Community Centre, Library and Police Station are housed within the Mearns Academy Campus. There are two public parks, both with children's play areas, and in addition the memorial park houses a bowling green and a skate-board facility.

There are three Christian congregations in the town: Laurencekirk Church of Scotland - which is linked with Aberluthnott Parish Church (comprising Marykirk and Luthermuir communities), St Laurence's Church, an Episcopalian Church which is part of the Diocese of Brechin; and also the Mearns congregation of the Catalyst Vineyard Church. In 1693 the Episcopalians had been driven from the parish kirk in the aftermath of the Glorious Revolution. A new meeting house was built at nearby Redmyre, though this was destroyed in 1746.

The Episcopalians built a chapel dedicated to St Laurence in Laurencekirk 1791 which took in the congregations of Redmyre and Luthermuir. The current St Laurence' was opened in 1873 and now also serves the congregations of Drumtochty, Fasque and Drumlithie. its archives are held at the University of Dundee as part of the Brechin Diocese's Archives.

== Local landmarks ==
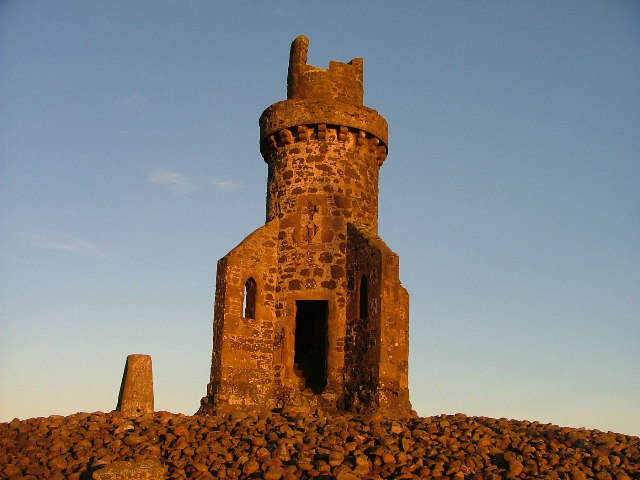
Johnston Tower

Johnston Tower was built to commemorate the Duke of Wellington's victory over Napoleon in the Peninsular War. It is situated on the Garvock Hill alongside a wind farm. The neighbouring residence, Johnston Lodge, was built in 1780 by James Farquhar, MP for Aberdeen Burghs and later for Portalington. The house was later owned by Lord Gardenstone.

== Local radio ==
Alongside the commercial enterprise of the local newspaper, The Kincardineshire Observer (often referred to as The Squeeker) which was first published in 1902, Laurencekirk has a Local Community Radio Station in Mearns FM. Broadcasting from nearby Stonehaven in the Townhall, Mearns FM helps to keep Laurencekirk up to date with local and charity events, as well as playing a wee bit of music. Staffed completely by volunteers, Mearns FM is run as a not for profit organisation, broadcasting under a Community Radio licence, with a remit to provide local focus news events and programming. Jointly funded by local adverts and local and national grants. Mearns FM has one of the largest listening areas of any Community Radio Station owing to the Mearns' distributed population, Mearns FM was set up to try to bring these distant communities together.

== Transport ==
The Dundee–Aberdeen line passes through the town. The railway station, which closed to passengers in 1967, was re-opened on 17 May 2009. The opening of this station has affirmed Laurencekirk's status as a commuter town providing links to Aberdeen, Dundee and beyond.

The Laurencekirk bypass opened in 1985 as part of the project to dual the road between Perth and Aberdeen. The bypass is now part of the A90 where a reduced speed limit is in operation for part of the bypass. A grade-separated (flyover) junction, which has been campaigned for several years by local residents, is planned for access to Laurencekirk, eliminating a flat crossing where numerous accidents have occurred. However, in 2021 it was revealed the project had been delayed indefinitely.

== In literature ==
Lewis Grassic Gibbon wrote much about The Mearns and the surrounding area in his book Sunset Song. A tribute centre can be visited at the Grassic Gibbon Centre at Arbuthnott, a few miles from Laurencekirk.

Fred Urquhart worked on the land in the Laurencekirk district during the Second World War, and his short stories make use of his observations of rural life there.

== Notable residents ==
- James Beattie (1735–1803), poet, moralist, and philosopher was born in Laurencekirk.
- Reverend George Cook (1772–1845), minister of Laurencekirk and Moderator of the General Assembly of the Church of Scotland
- Francis Garden, Lord Gardenstone (1721–1793), founder of Laurencekirk.
- James Henderson (1823–1906), influential newspaper and magazine publisher.
- Sir Robert Pearson (1871–1954), cricketer, advocate and chairman of the London Stock Exchange.
- James Andrew Robbie (1910–1977), geologist.
- Thomas Ruddiman (1674–1757) served as the parish schoolmaster from 1695 to 1700.
- Alexander Charles Stephen (1893–1966), zoologist.
- Fred Urquhart (1912–1995), writer.
- Ryan Gauld (born 1995), Scottish footballer.

== Gallery ==
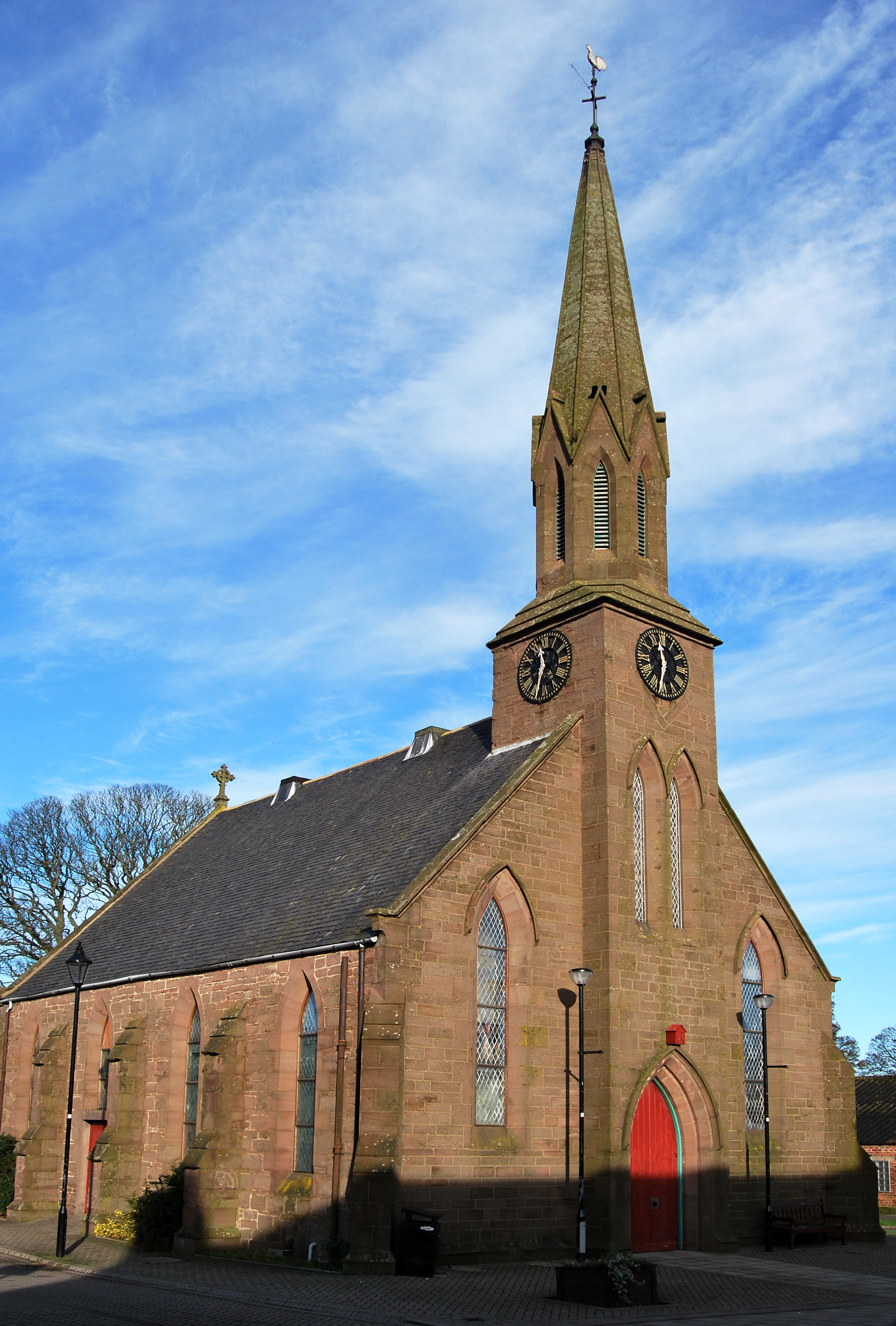
Laurencekirk Masonic Hall (a former church)

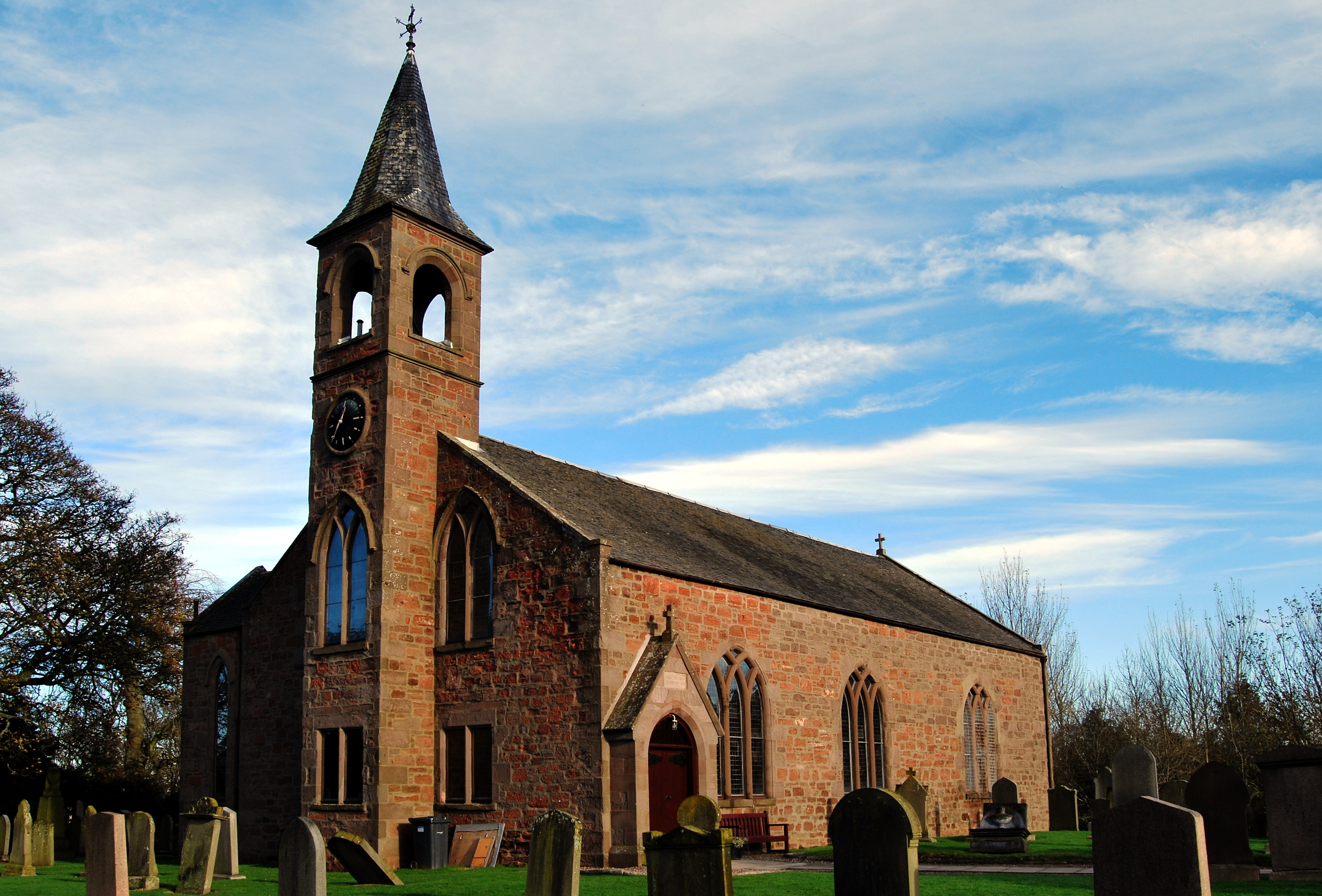
Laurencekirk Church of Scotland

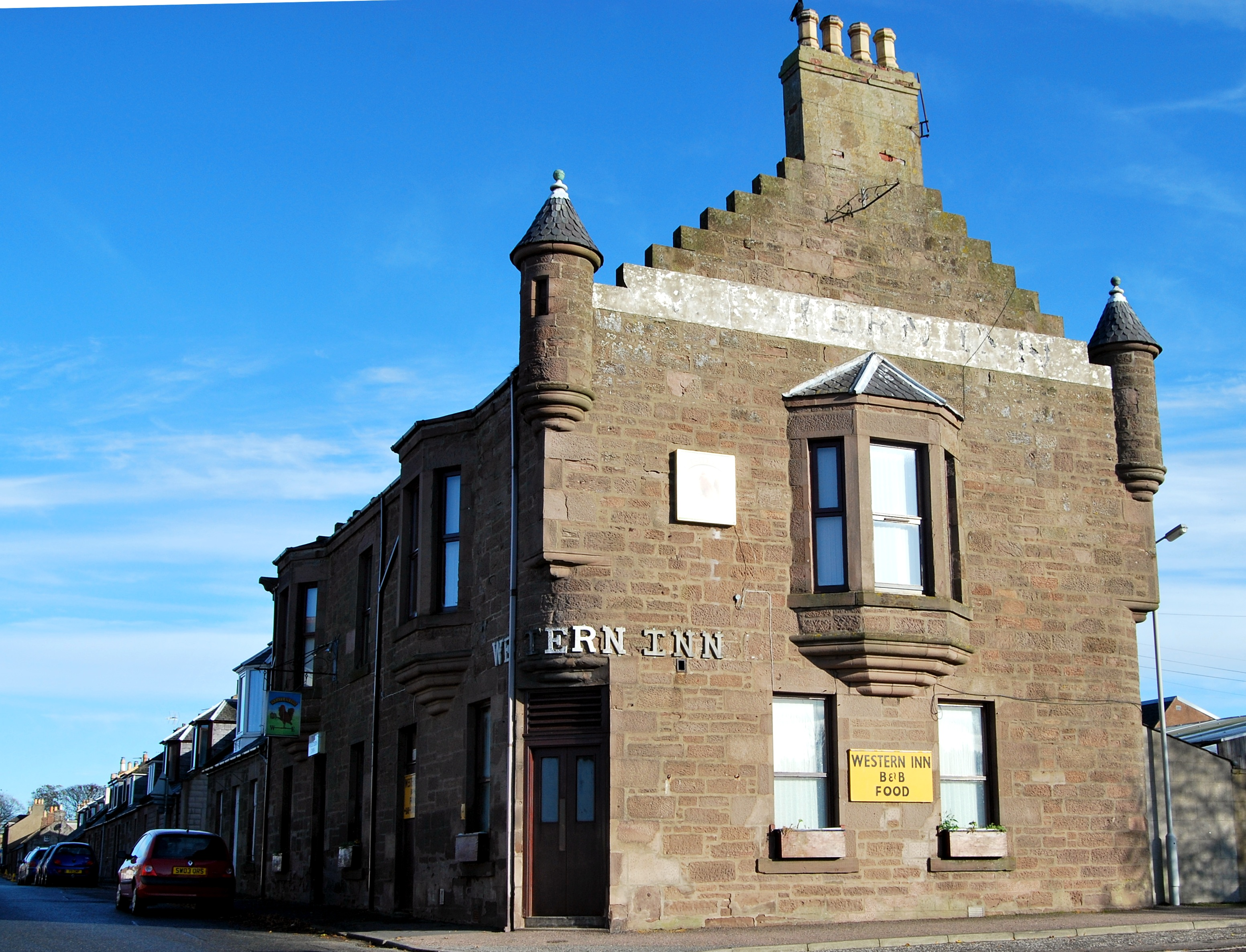
Western Inn Laurencekirk
