= Mason–Stothers theorem =

Theorem about polynomials, analogous to the abc conjecture for integers

The Mason–Stothers theorem, or simply Stothers theorem, is a mathematical theorem about polynomials, analogous to the abc conjecture for integers. It is named after Walter Wilson Stothers, who published it in 1981, and R. C. Mason, who rediscovered it shortly thereafter.

The theorem states:

Let a(t), b(t), and c(t) be relatively prime polynomials over a field such that a + b = c and such that not all of them have vanishing derivative. Then

$$\max\{\deg(a),\deg(b),\deg(c)\} \le \deg(\operatorname{rad}(abc))-1.$$

Here rad(f) is the product of the distinct irreducible factors of f. For algebraically closed fields it is the polynomial of minimum degree that has the same roots as f; in this case deg(rad(f)) gives the number of distinct roots of f.

== Examples ==
- Over fields of characteristic 0 the condition that a, b, and c do not all have vanishing derivative is equivalent to the condition that they are not all constant. Over fields of characteristic p > 0 it is not enough to assume that they are not all constant. For example, considered as polynomials over some field of characteristic p, the identity t^{p} + 1 = (t + 1)^{p} gives an example where the maximum degree of the three polynomials (a = t^{p} and b = 1 as the summands on the left hand side, and c = (t + 1)^{p} as the right hand side) is p, but the degree of the radical is only 2.
- Taking a(t) = t^{n} and c(t) = (t+1)^{n} gives an example where equality holds in the Mason–Stothers theorem, showing that the inequality is in some sense the best possible.
- A corollary of the Mason–Stothers theorem is the analog of Fermat's Last Theorem for function fields: if a(t)^{n} + b(t)^{n} = c(t)^{n} for a, b, c relatively prime polynomials over a field of characteristic not dividing n and n > 2 then either at least one of a, b, or c is 0 or they are all constant.

== Proof ==
Snyder (2000) gave the following elementary proof of the Mason–Stothers theorem.

Step 1. The condition a + b + c = 0 implies that the Wronskians W(a, b) = ab′ − a′b, W(b, c), and W(c, a) are all equal. Write W for their common value.

Step 2. The condition that at least one of the derivatives a′, b′, or c′ is nonzero and that a, b, and c are coprime is used to show that W is nonzero. For example, if W = 0 then ab′ = a′b so a divides a′ (as a and b are coprime) so a′ = 0 (as deg a > deg a′ unless a is constant).

Step 3. W is divisible by each of the greatest common divisors (a, a′), (b, b′), and (c, c′). Since these are coprime it is divisible by their product, and since W is nonzero we get

deg (a, a′) + deg (b, b′) + deg (c, c′) ≤ deg W.

Step 4. Substituting in the inequalities

deg (a, a′) ≥ deg a − (number of distinct roots of a)
deg (b, b′) ≥ deg b − (number of distinct roots of b)
deg (c, c′) ≥ deg c − (number of distinct roots of c)

(where the roots are taken in some algebraic closure) and

deg W ≤ deg a + deg b − 1

we find that

deg c ≤ (number of distinct roots of abc) − 1

which is what we needed to prove.

== Generalizations ==
There is a natural generalization in which the ring of polynomials is replaced by a one-dimensional function field. Let k be an algebraically closed field of characteristic 0, let C/k be a smooth projective curve of genus g, let

$a,b\in k(C)$ be rational functions on C satisfying $a+b=1$,

and let S be a set of points in C(k) containing all of the zeros and poles of a and b. Then

$$\max\bigl\{ \deg(a),\deg(b) \bigr\} \le \max\bigl\{|S| + 2g - 2,0\bigr\}.$$

Here the degree of a function in k(C) is the degree of the map it induces from C to P^{1}. This was proved by Mason, with an alternative short proof published the same year by J. H. Silverman .

There is a further generalization, due independently to J. F. Voloch and to W. D. Brownawell and D. W. Masser, that gives an upper bound for n-variable S-unit equations a_{1} + a_{2} + ... + a_{n} = 1 provided that no subset of the a_{i} are k-linearly dependent. Under this assumption, they prove that

$$\max\bigl\{ \deg(a_1),\ldots,\deg(a_n) \bigr\} \le \frac{1}{2}n(n-1)\max\bigl\{|S| + 2g - 2,0\bigr\}.$$
