= Hong Kong Philharmonic Society (1895–1941) =

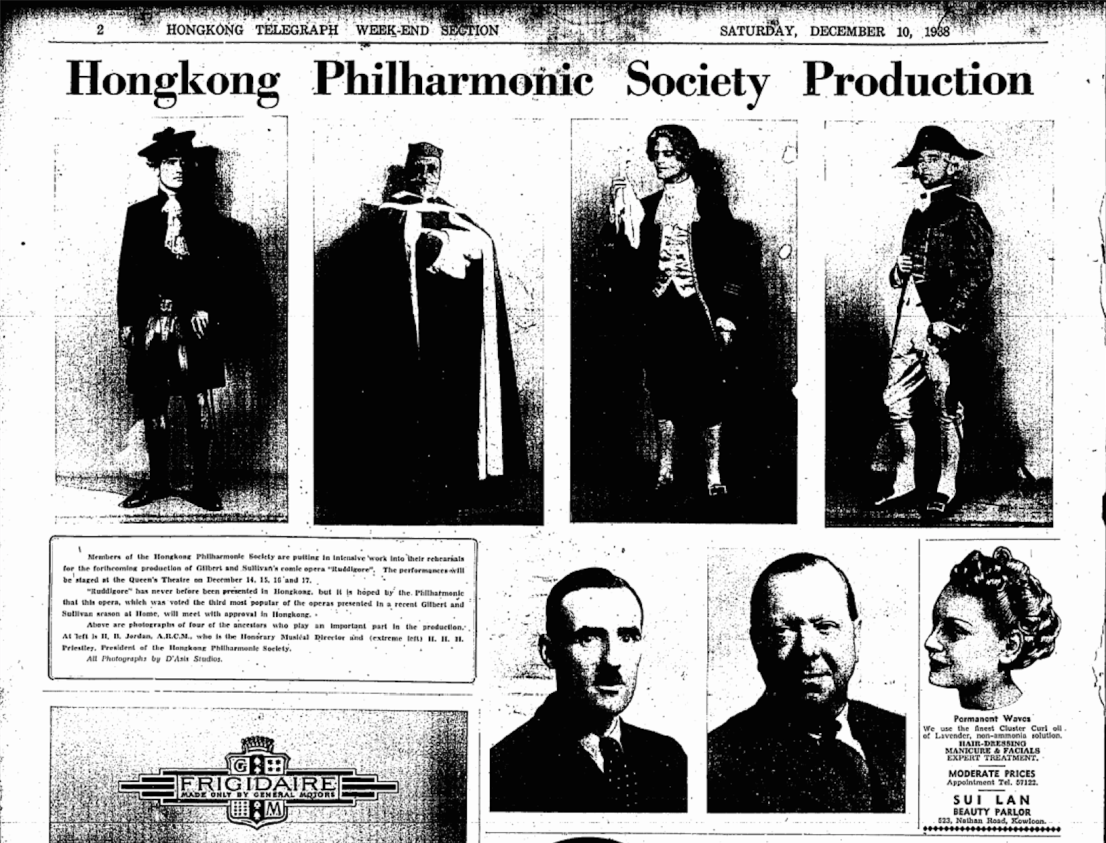
Advertorial of Hong Kong Philharmonic Society's Ruddigore on Hong Kong Telegraph (1938)

Hong Kong Philharmonic Society was an amateur music groups founded by a group of British music lovers in the colonial Hong Kong. Aim at producing various kind of musical performance by the British, later it focus on comic opera and made itself a quasi-theatrical group.

== Origin ==
After the establishment of the colonial Hong Kong, western music was brought to the little South China village by the British. Hong Kong Choral Society was founded in 1861 for the purpose of fund raising to the construction of the old City Hall.

The Choral Society later changed its name to the Hong Kong Philharmonic Society (not to be confused with a later orchestra founded after World War II sharing the same name.) On 23 November 1895, the Society gave their first concert in Theatre Royal of the old City Hall. The programme included solo singing, choral singing, chamber music and orchestral music, the conductor of the concert was George P. Lammert, who was a famous auctioneer in the city.

It organised variety show of music until 1897 and resumed in 1904. Their programme not just concert pieces but they already tried on theatrical works like Edward German's Merry England (1913) and Gilbert and Sullivan's The Yeoman of the Guard (1914).

The Society gone silence again since 1914 because of the First World War.

== Vanguard of English comic operas in Hong Kong ==
In 1923, the Society reactivated again. After two concerts, the Society gave a new trial on comic opera. The Society staged Gilbert and Sullivan's The Yeoman of te Guard in 1924 and got a great success, it motivated the members of the Society to concentrate on English comic operas. Since 1924, they produced 19 operas before the World War II. Below is a list of opera productions by the Society since 1924:

Date	Composer(s)	Repertoire	Producer	Conductor
Dec 1924	Gilbert & Sullivan	The Yeoman of the Guard	W.G. Wheller	Stanley Collett
Mar 1925	Gilbert & Sullivan	The Gondoliers	W.G. Wheller	Stanley Collett
Dec 1925	Gilbert & Sullivan	Iolanthe	R.R. Davies	Stanley Collett
Dec 1926	Gilbert & Sullivan	Pirates of Penzance	R.R. Davies	W.R. Fleming
Mar 1927	Gilbert & Sullivan	H.M.S. Pinafore	R.R. Davies	W.R. Fleming
Dec 1927	Edward German	Merry England	A.S. Bedells	W.H. Fritz Earle
Dec 1928	Edward German	Tom Jones	R.R. Davies	W.H. Fritz Earle
Dec 1929	Gilbert & Sullivan	The Geisha	F.G. Hunt	Bakaleinikoff
Dec 1930	Gilbert & Sullivan	The Yeoman of the Guard	R.R. Davies	F. Mason
Dec 1931	Paul Rubens	Miss Hook of Holland	William Robertson	J.L. Gecks
Jan 1933	Alfred Reynolds	The Fountain of Youth	S.A. Swelt	D.S. Hill
Feb 1934	Gilbert & Sullivan	The Pirates of Penzance	D. Davis	C.S. Trowt
Nov 1934	Edward German	Merry England (concert version)	--	Anderson Miller
Jan 1936	Lionel Monckton	A Country Girl	Rev. Cyril Brown	A.B. Yule
Dec 1936	Harold Fraser-Simson	The Maid of the Mountains	Rev. Cyril Brown	A.B. Yule
Apr 1937	Harold Fraser-Simson	The Street Singers	Rev. Cyril Brown	Lindsay Lafford
Dec 1937	Lionel Monckton & Howard Talbo	The Arcadians	William Robertson	Lindsay Lafford
Dec 1938	Gilbert & Sullivan	Ruddigore	Rev. Cyril Brown	H.B. Jordan
Dec 1939	Vincent Youmans	No, No, Nanette	William Robertson	G.V. Hobbs

== The last concert ==
Though the repertoire of the Society was mainly comic opera after 1924, the Society also performed British composer Samuel Coleridge-Taylor's cantata Hiawatha in March 1935.

The last appearance of the Society was 8 December 1941, that was a concert featured an all-Beethoven programme, consisted of Egmont Overture, Symphony No.5 and Piano Concerto No.5 with Harry Ore as soloist.

Rayson Huang and Solomon Bard were playing in the violin section.

According to Bard's autobiography, the conductor of the concert was killed in the first few days of the Battle of Hong Kong.

The concert marked the end of the Hong Kong Philharmonic Society.

== Historical controversies ==
=== The founding year ===
In 1928, the secretary of the Society T. V. Harmon submitted a letter to the editor of the Hong Kong Telegraph, to clarify the mistakes in an article which introduced a brief history of the Society on 18 August 1928. In Harmon's clarification, he stated that,

The present Hongkong Philharmonic Society is the resuscitation of the Hong Kong Choral Society, which was formed in the year 1861 [...]

This Society continued to prosper until 1894, when a period of inactivity set in. A revival took place at a meeting held in 1903, when the name of the Society was changed to its present one, viz, the H.K. Philharmonic Society.

However, various sources proved that, the Hong Kong Philharmonic Society gave their first public performance on 23 November 1895, records of their performances in 1896 and 1897 can also be found.

=== Falsely related with Hong Kong Philharmonic Orchestra ===
Since 1978, the pre-war Hong Kong Philharmonic Society was mistakenly regarded as the predecessor of the Hong Kong Philharmonic Orchestra, which is registered as Hong Kong Philharmonic Society in 1957, and registered as limited company with same name in 1973.

The Orchestra never made such claim of the succession before 1978. In various publications in 2000's, Solomon Bard stated that the two Philharmonic Societies are not related, the only relation is the similarity of the names.
