= Walter Mykura =

Czech-born geologist working in Britain

Walter Mykura (1926–1988) was a Czech-born British geologist. He served as president of the Edinburgh Geological Society from 1975 to 1977. He was awarded the Clough Medal in 1982 and the T. N. George Medal in 1987.

== Life ==
Mykura was born in Falknov nad Ohří, Czechoslovakia (now Sokolov, Czech Republic) in 1926, the son of Franz Mykura. His family came to Britain in 1938 as refugees.

He was educated at Yardleys Grammar School in Birmingham 1938 to 1941. Walter saw service in the RAF during the Second World War but was too young for active service. He studied Geology at the University of Birmingham from 1946, graduating BSc in 1950. He then joined the Geological Survey group in Edinburgh.

In 1970, he was elected a Fellow of the Royal Society of Edinburgh. In 1976 his alma mater awarded him an honorary doctorate (DSc).

He retired following a stroke in 1985. He died suddenly as the result of being struck by a car on 13 May 1988 in Edinburgh.

== Family ==
Walter was married to Alison. They had three sons and a daughter including Hamish Mykura.

== Publications ==
- The Geology of the Neighbourhood of Edinburgh (1962)
- British Regional Geology: Orkney and Shetland (1976)
- The Geology of Western Shetland (1976)
- Sand and Gravel Resources of the Highland Region (1978)
- Mineral Deposits of Europe (1982)
- The Old Red Sandstone West of Loch Ness (1983)
- Edinburgh Memoir
- West Shetland Memoir
