= Glenbervie (disambiguation) =

Glenbervie is a village and rural area in Scotland.

Glenbervie may also refer to:

- Glenbervie House, a mansion house, incorporating an earlier castle in Kincardine and Mearns, Scotland
- Glenbervie, New Zealand, a settlement in Northland, New Zealand
- Glenbervie railway station, a railway station located on the Craigieburn line in Victoria, Australia
- Glenbervie, any of four ships by that name, all of which were lost to the perils of the sea
