= Bogjurgan Hill =

Coordinates: 56.9576°N 2.3997°W

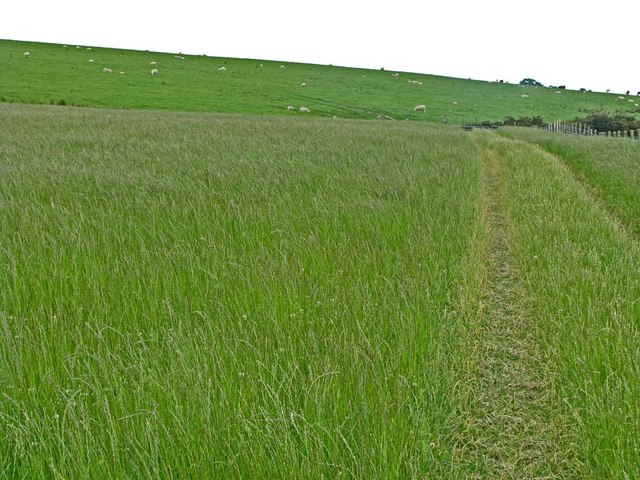
Sheep grazing on southern slopes of Bogjurgan Hill

Bogjurgan Hill is an elevated landform at the southern verge of the Fetteresso Forest in Aberdeenshire, Scotland. Its top is at an elevation of 299 metres (981 ft) above sea level. Historical features in this region of Kincardineshire include Fetteresso Castle, Drumtochty Castle and Muchalls Castle.

== See also ==
- Drumtochty Forest
