= Benholm =

Settlement in Aberdeenshire, Scotland

Coordinates: 56°48′53″N 2°19′21″W

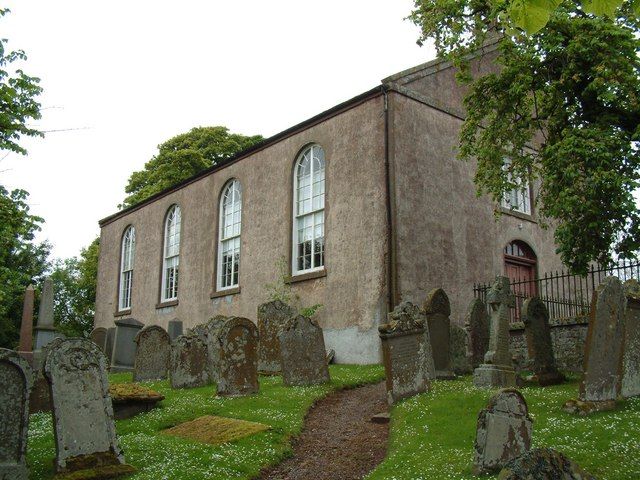
Benholm Parish Church

Benholm is a settlement in Aberdeenshire, Scotland. It is now a conservation area and is home to Benholm Mill.

The A92 passes the eastern edge of Benholm. The settlement was served by Birnie Road Halt railway station from 1865 to 1951.

== Geography ==
Benholm lies near the North Sea coast, to the southwest of Inverbervie, and a little northeast of Johnshaven. It lies within the former boundaries of Kincardineshire.

== History ==
Evidence of a Kirk existing here dates back to 1242 and a history of milling dating back to the 12th century. The kirk was rebuilt in 1832. The area was designated as a conservation area in 2006. The church is no longer in regular ecclesiastical use, and the last service was conducted by Rev. George Hastie in June 2004. In February 2006, with the help of the community, the Kirk was purchased and taken into care by the Scottish Redundant Churches Trust (SCRT) - now called Historic Churches Scotland. The former Benholm Parish area now falls into the wider St Cyrus Church of Scotland parish, also covering Johnshaven and Garvock parishes.

The community hosts the 18th century Benholm Mill, the only surviving water-powered meal mill in the Kincardine area of Aberdeenshire. The ‘Mill of Benholm Enterprise (SCIO)’ is a charity working to find a sustainable use for the site benefiting the community and stop the ongoing deterioration to preserve the Mill of Benholm for generations to come.

Benholm was once a thriving settlement, but with the decline in the importance of agriculture, its fortunes and population declined. During the 1950s, the local smiddy closed. Then, in 1968, Benholm Primary School was also closed, with children going to Johnshaven Primary. By 1972, the village hall was sold and later demolished in 1992. The post office closed in 1988.
