= Fetteresso Forest =

Scottish woodland

Coordinates: 56.974°N 2.397°W

The Fetteresso Forest is a woodland that is principally coniferous situated in the Mounth range of the Grampian Mountains in Aberdeenshire, Scotland. The forest has a number of prominent mountain peaks including the Hill of Blacklodge and Craiginour peak. A good overlook for viewing the forest from the north side lies on an unnamed tarmac road which leads north from the Slug Road to the Raedykes Roman site. The Cowie Water flows through and drains much of the forest. To the north of the easternmost part of the forest is the archaeological site Raedykes Roman Camp, as well as Cowton Burn. The Slug Road runs along much of the northeast perimeter of Fetteresso Forest.

Notable features in this vicinity include Dunnottar Castle, Fetteresso Castle, Bogjurgan Hill and Muchalls Castle.

== Natural features ==
Summer flow rates of the Cowie Water are typically in the range of 150 cubic feet per second (4.2 m^{3}/s) within Fetteresso Forest. July values for pH have been measured at 8.17 or slightly alkaline July water temperatures are about 11.9 degrees Celsius and electrical conductivity at the mouth has been measured at a relatively low value of .06 micro-Siemens per meter. Turbidity measured exactly 24 hours after a moderate rainfall of one centimeter was 19 JTU in a July circumstance.

== See also ==
- Drumtochty Forest
- Tewel
- Ury House
