= Inverbervie railway station =

Disused railway station in Inverbervie, Aberdeenshire

Bervie
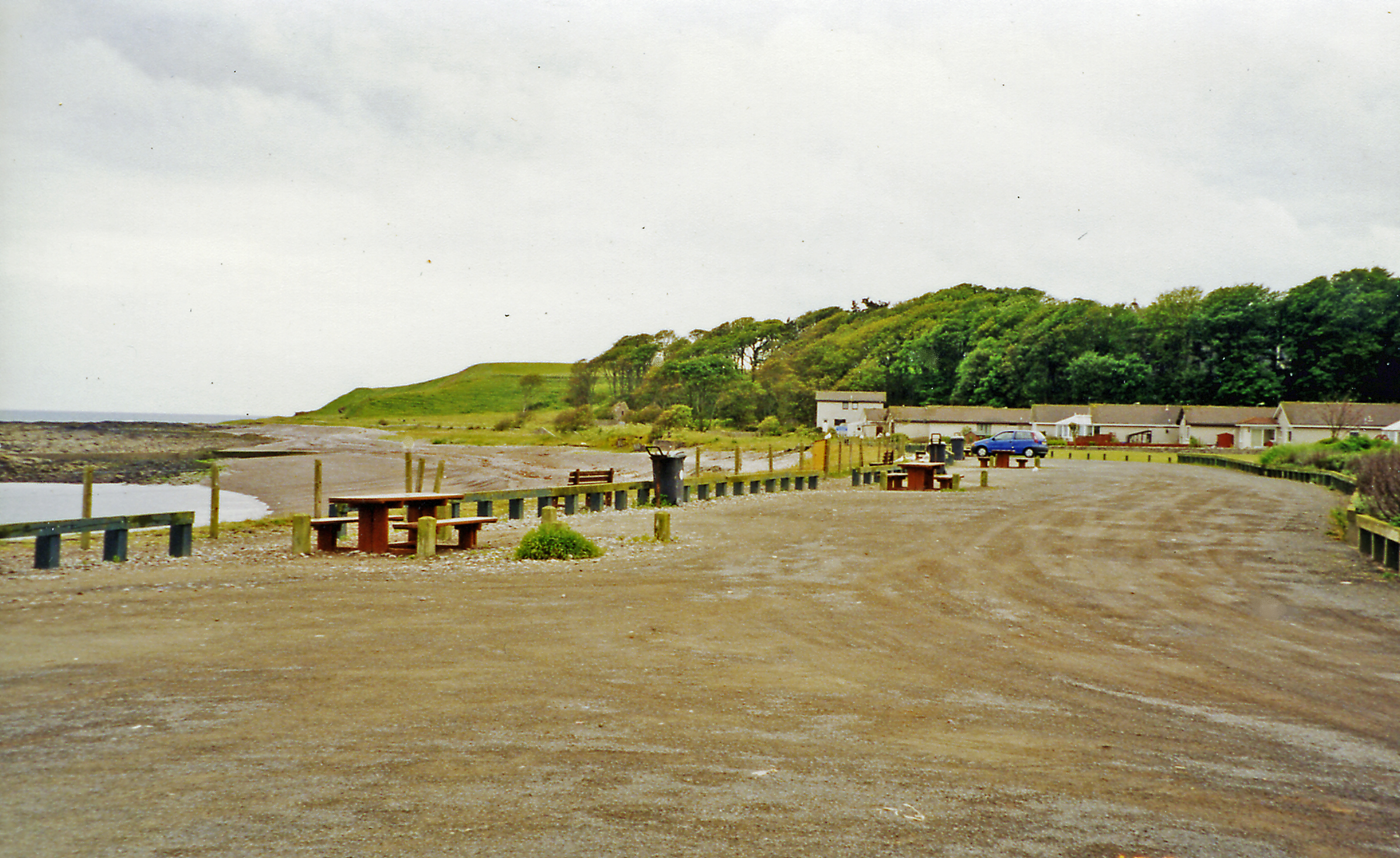
- The site of the station in 2002

General information
- Location: Kirkburn; Inverbervie, Aberdeenshire; Scotland
- Coordinates: 56.8424°N 2.2755°W
- Grid reference: NO832723
- Platforms: 1

Other information
- Status: Disused

History
- Original company: Scottish North Eastern Railway
- Pre-grouping: North British Railway
- Post-grouping: London, Midland and Scottish Railway

Key dates
- 1 November 1865: Opened as Bervie
- 5 July 1926: Name changed to Inverbervie
- 1 October 1951: Closed for passengers
- 23 May 1966: Closed completely
Location

Bervie railway station served the town of Inverbervie, Aberdeenshire, Scotland from 1865 to 1966 on the Montrose and Bervie Railway.

== History ==
The station opened as Bervie on 1 November 1865 by the Scottish North Eastern Railway. It was the northern terminus of the line, situated north of Gourdon station. The goods yard was to the east and there was a locomotive shed nearby as well as a carriage siding to the south of the platform. The station's name was changed to Inverbervie on 5 July 1926. The station closed to regular passenger services in 1951, but continued to be used for goods trains until the last train (which was a passenger train to mark the occasion of the final closure of the station) ran on 22 May 1966.

== Present Day ==
On what was the site of the former Bervie Railway Station is now the beachfront carpark for Bervie Beach, as well as a small recycling amenity area. Heading south, the line of the old railway has been concreted to make a path, providing an accessible and popular walk along beachfront to Gourdon.

In 2014, the sea-front area was overhauled by the local council. Within the site, a local horticultural group, Brighter Bervie (originating from Bervie Church), maintain planters. Some of these are shaped like trains, reflecting the history of the site.

Much of the original platform wall is still in place, marking the edge of the carpark.

Within the ground is also a 7ft long sculpture created by Glasgow-based artist Debbie Ryan. Within the local community, she ran workshop sessions with community groups of all ages, in order to create the art work that was eventually incorporated into the sculpture. It is a mosaic featuring images depicting Inverbervie's marine and land heritage.

Preceding station	Disused railways	Following station
Gourdon; Line and station closed	Scottish North Eastern Railway; Montrose and Bervie Railway	Terminus
