= List of listed buildings in Arbuthnott =

This is a list of listed buildings in the parish of Arbuthnott in Aberdeenshire, Scotland.

== List ==
Name	Location	Date listed	Geo-coordinates	Notes	Category	LB number	Image
Arbuthnott Parish Kirk			56°51′46″N 2°19′38″W		A	2876	Upload another image See more images
Arbuthnott House Sundial			56°51′59″N 2°20′20″W		B	2838	Upload Photo
Arbuthnott House Mains Farm			56°52′09″N 2°20′25″W		B	2839	Upload Photo
Arbuthnott House - East Gate			56°52′20″N 2°20′18″W		B	2841	Upload Photo
House Of Kairs - Mains Farmhouse			56°52′55″N 2°22′46″W		B	2843	Upload Photo
House Of Kairs - Lodge			56°52′20″N 2°23′23″W		B	2844	Upload Photo
Arbuthnott House - Ice House			56°52′00″N 2°20′15″W		B	2881	Upload Photo
Parish Kirk Manse			56°51′46″N 2°19′35″W		C(S)	2877	Upload Photo
Allardyce Castle			56°51′24″N 2°18′04″W		A	2878	Upload Photo
House Of Kairs			56°52′46″N 2°22′52″W		B	2842	Upload Photo
Allardyce Castle - Gate Piers			56°51′23″N 2°18′04″W		A	2879	Upload Photo
Arbuthnott House			56°52′00″N 2°20′16″W		A	2880	Upload another image See more images
Arbuthnott House - Garden House			56°51′59″N 2°20′27″W		B	2837	Upload Photo
Arbuthnott House - Doocot			56°52′10″N 2°20′31″W		C(S)	2840	Upload Photo
Arbuthnott House, North Bridge Over Arbuthnott Burn			56°52′02″N 2°20′16″W		A	31	Upload another image See more images

== Key ==
The scheme for classifying buildings in Scotland is:

- Category A: "buildings of national or international importance, either architectural or historic; or fine, little-altered examples of some particular period, style or building type."
- Category B: "buildings of regional or more than local importance; or major examples of some particular period, style or building type, which may have been altered."
- Category C: "buildings of local importance; lesser examples of any period, style, or building type, as originally constructed or moderately altered; and simple traditional buildings which group well with other listed buildings."

In March 2016 there were 47,288 listed buildings in Scotland. Of these, 8% were Category A, and 50% were Category B, with the remaining 42% being Category C.

== See also ==
- List of listed buildings in Aberdeenshire
