= Allardice Castle =

16th century manor in Kincardineshire, Scotland

Coordinates: 56.85617°N 2.30170°W

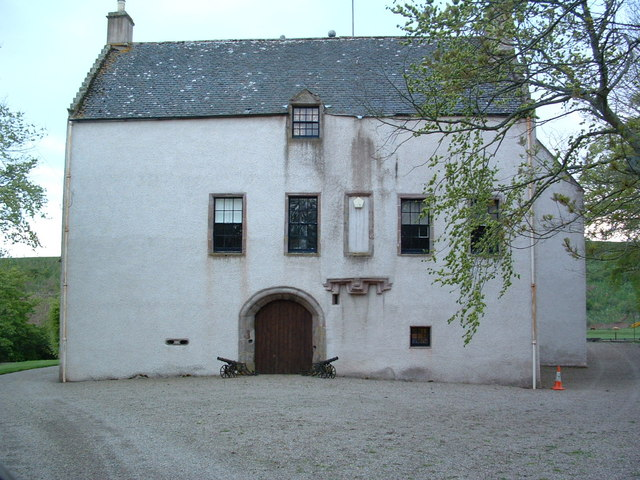
Allardice Castle

Allardice Castle (also spelled Allardyce) is a sixteenth-century manor house in Kincardineshire, Scotland.

== Location ==
It is approximately 1.5 kilometres north-west of the town of Inverbervie. The Bervie Water river flows through the grounds, flowing around Allardice Castle on both sides. Allardice may be viewed as one of a chain of coastal castles; to the north are Dunnottar Castle (ruined), Fetteresso Castle, Cowie Castle (ruined) and Muchalls Castle. The castle is a category A listed building.

== Origins and history ==
Allardice castle was the chief seat of the Barons of Allardice, an ancient family who first appear in an 1197 charter. The lands belonging to the Allardice estate lie within the parish of Arbuthnott, and lie to the south of the land belonging to the Viscount of Arbuthnott's estate. Since 1542 (the time at which the current L-plan building was built) many alterations and changes have been made to the original structure. As such, the original plan is unrecognisable.

== Modern Day ==
The current owners purchased the castle in the 1970s. During this time, an extensive restoration has taken place, upgrading it in many ways. In 2026, the castle was up for sale for an asking price of offers over £950,000.
