= Bervie Water =

River in Aberdeenshire, Scotland

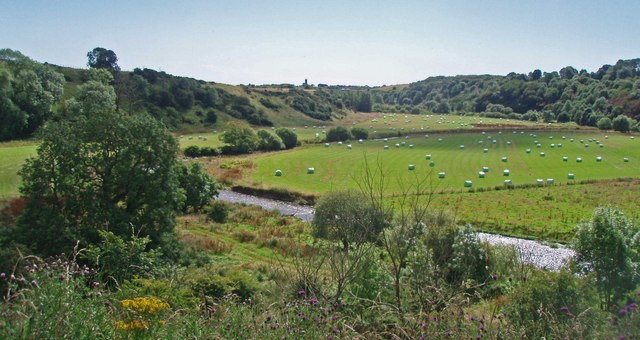
- Bervie Water south of Allardice Castle

Location
- Country: Scotland
- Council: Aberdeenshire

Physical characteristics
- Source
  - location: Drumtochty Forest
- Mouth: North Sea
  - location: Inverbervie, Scotland
  - coordinates: 56.84391°N 2.27130°W
  - elevation: 0ft
- Length: 18.8 m (62 ft)
- Basin size: 50.7 square miles

Bervie Water (Scottish Gaelic: Uisge Bhiorbhaigh) is a river in Aberdeenshire, Scotland which rises in the eastern Grampians in the Drumtochty Forest and flows in an s-shape across The Mearns to reach the North Sea at Inverbervie.

The river is about 18.8 miles long, with the area of the basin being about 50.7 square miles.

The source is at the Hill of Gothie, approximately 1527 ft above sea level, where it comes down from the Braes of Fordoun. Approximately 2 kilometres (1.2 mi) upstream of the North Sea, the Bervie Water flows through the grounds of Allardice Castle. The Bothenoth Burn (Burn of Healing) joins the Bervie Water to the east of Arbuthnott House. At Arbuthnott the river forms a steep-sided valley where gardens were laid out on the south-facing slope. It is a series of four terraces across which run diagonal intersecting grass paths.

Near to where it flows into Bervie Bay, it is crossed by the Bervie Jubilee Bridge (1935) which carries the A92 into Inverbervie. The bridge replaced the earlier single-arched masonry bridge built in 1799, which still survives adjacent to the north abutment.

== See also ==
- Carron Water, Aberdeenshire
