= Inverbervie Town House =

Municipal building in Inverbervie, Scotland

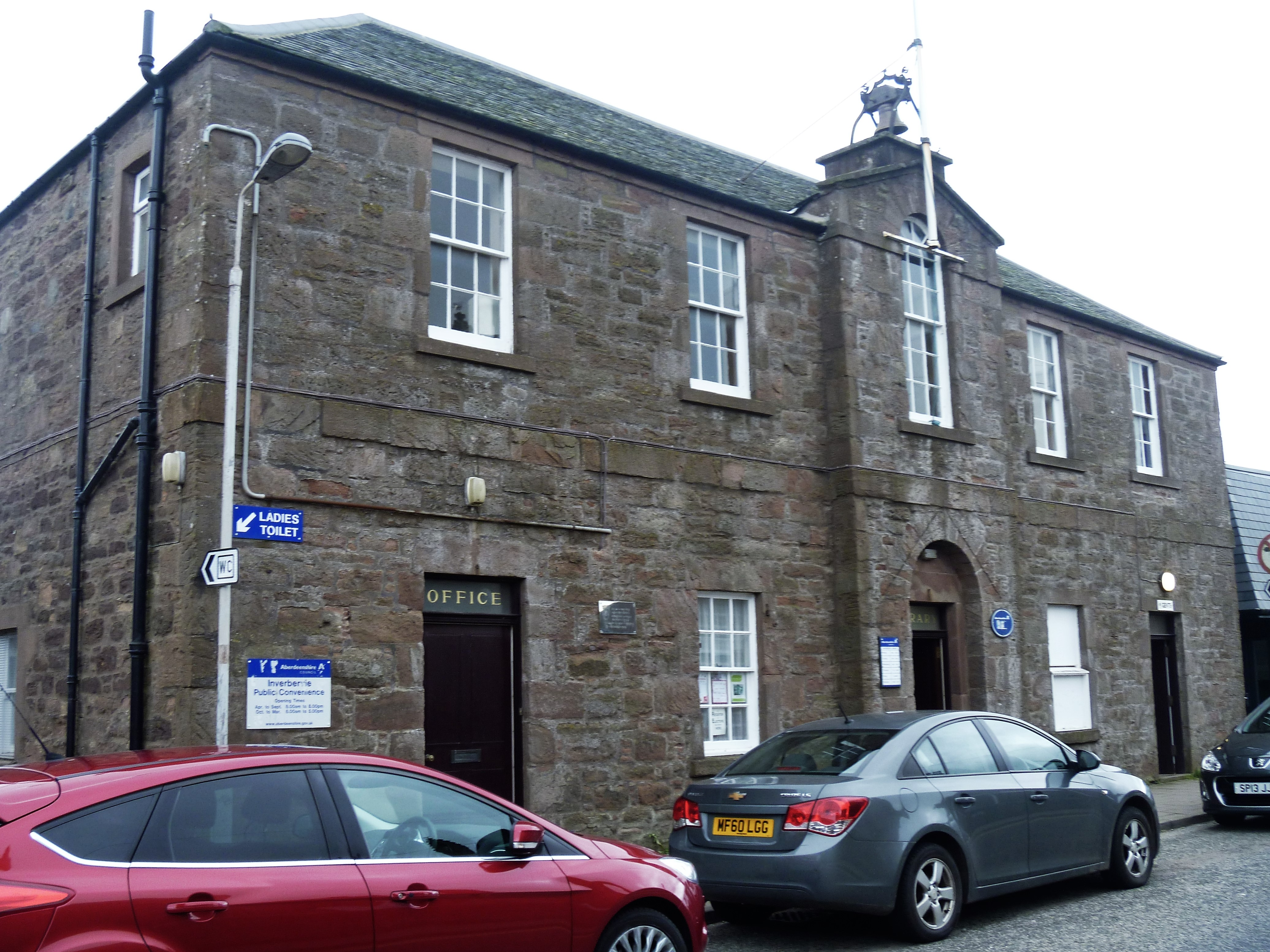
- Inverbervie Town Hall

- Shown in Aberdeenshire
- 56.8448°N 2.2806°W
- Location: Church Street, Inverbervie

History
- Built: 1840

Site notes
- Architectural style: Scottish medieval style

Listed Building – Category B
- Official name: Town House, Church Street
- Designated: 18 August 1972
- Reference no.: LB35065

Inverbervie Town House is a municipal structure in Church Street in Inverbervie, Aberdeenshire, Scotland. The structure, which is primarily used as a public library, is a Category B listed building.

== History ==
The first municipal building in the town was a tolbooth which was erected in the Market Place in 1569.

After the tolbooth became dilapidated, it was demolished, and a new town house was erected in Church Street: it was built in the Scottish medieval style using rubble masonry and was completed in 1720. The date stone from the old tolbooth was recovered and inserted into the wall of the new building. On the ground floor there was a market hall and, adjacent to it, a vaulted cell which was used for the incarnation of petty criminals. On the first floor, there was an assembly hall and a small council chamber for the burgh council and, at roof level, there was an ornate belfry. By the early 19th century the building was in a poor state: the cell was described as "quite unfit for the regular confinement of prisoners" and was locally known as the "Black Hole". The conditions were so bad that, by the early 19th century, no criminals had been incarcerated in the cell within living memory.

In the light of these critical reports, the burgh council had the building substantially remodelled in 1840. The new design involved a symmetrical main frontage with five bays facing onto Church Street; the central bay, which slightly projected forward, featured round headed opening with voussoirs enclosing a doorway, and, on the first floor, there was a tall round headed sash window which rose into the pediment above. The outer bays contained doorways on the ground floor, while the other bays on both floors were fenestrated by standard sash windows. At roof level, the belfry was replaced by a simple bellcote, at sometime in the 1960's. Internally, the principal room was the burgh council chamber on the first floor.

The building continued to serve as the meeting place of the burgh council for much of the 20th century, but ceased to be the local seat of government when the enlarged Kincardine and Deeside District Council was formed in 1975. The building was subsequently converted for use as a public library and, in 2018, was the venue for the launch of the new Inverbervie Folk Museum.

== See also ==
- List of listed buildings in Inverbervie, Aberdeenshire
