= Arbuthnott =

Coordinates: 56.871083°N 2.324027°W

Arbuthnott: Scottish Gaelic: Obar Bhuadhnait
- Village
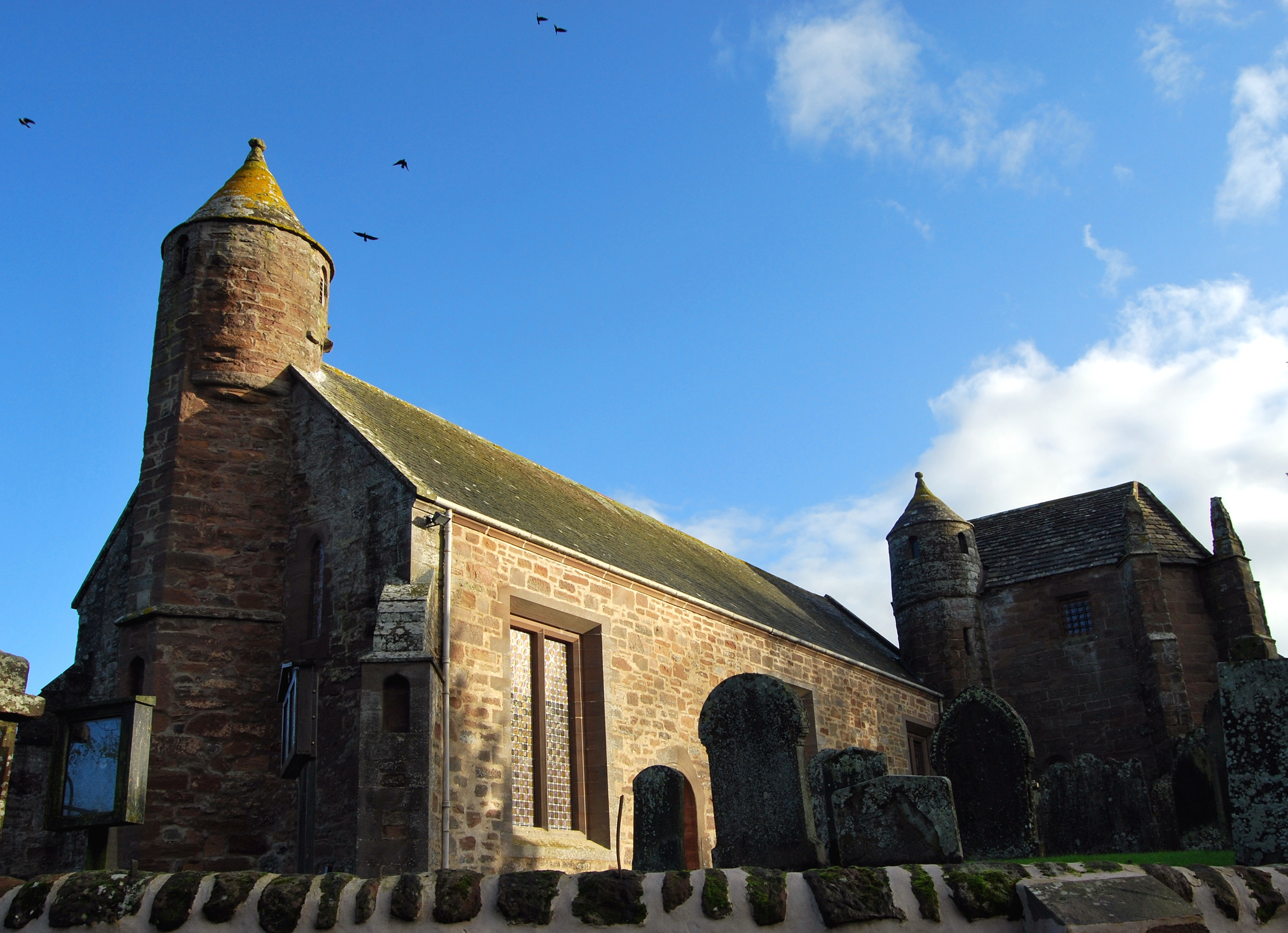
- Arbuthnott Parish Church

- Location within Aberdeenshire
- OS grid reference: NO8024975550
- Council area: Aberdeenshire
- Country: Scotland
- Sovereign state: United Kingdom
- Post town: LAURENCEKIRK
- Postcode district: AB30
- Dialling code: 01561; 01569
- Police: Scotland
- Fire: Scottish
- Ambulance: Scottish
- UK Parliament: West Aberdeenshire and Kincardine
- Scottish Parliament: Angus North and Mearns

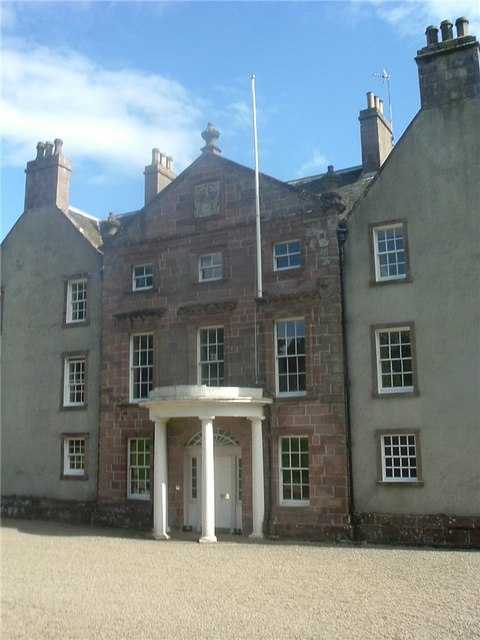
Arbuthnott House

Arbuthnott (Scottish Gaelic: Obar Bhuadhnait, "mouth of the Buadhnat") is a hamlet and parish in the Howe of the Mearns, a low-lying agricultural district of Aberdeenshire, Scotland. It is located on the B967, east of Fordoun (on the A90) and north-west of Inverbervie (on the A92). The nearest railway station is Laurencekirk.

The most salient feature of the hamlet is the 13th century Parish Church of St Ternan, in which the Missal of Arbuthnott was written. Today the church congregation is part of the combined Church of Scotland parish of Arbuthnott, Bervie and Kinneff. The Church had its final services on 31st May 2026, and is now in private ownership.

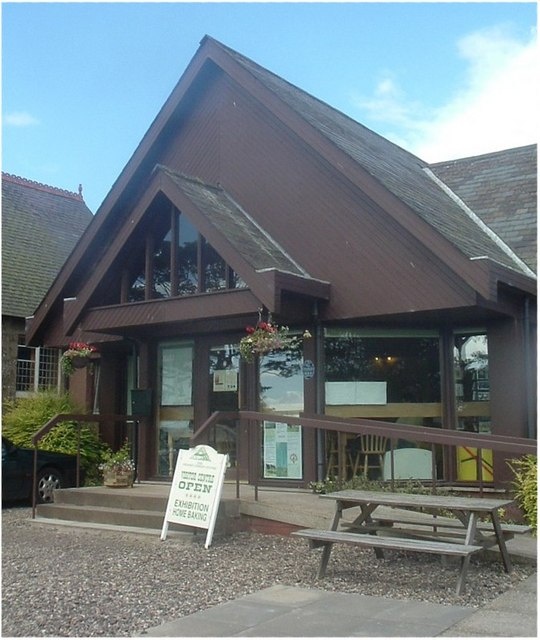
The Grassic Gibbon Centre

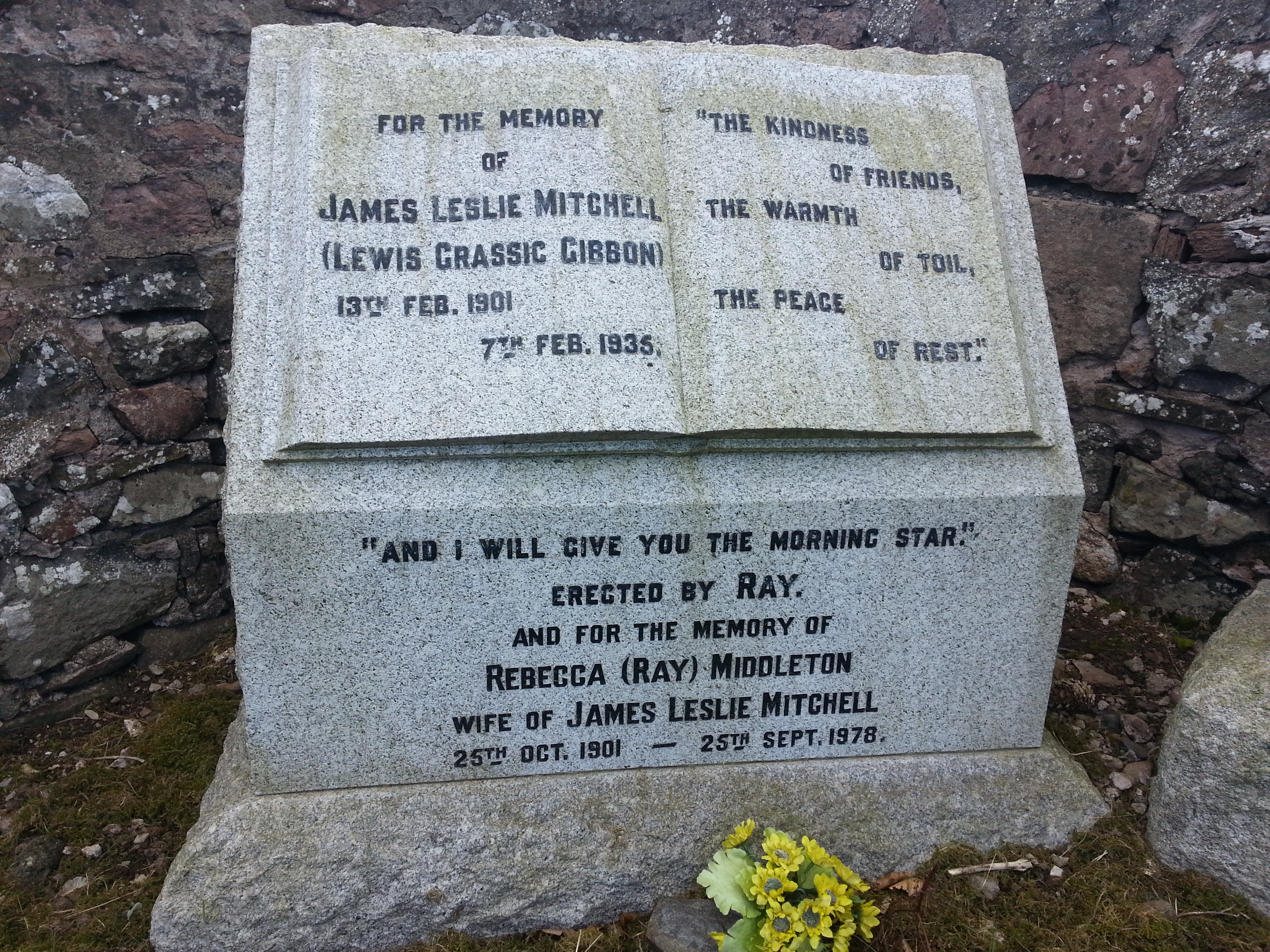
Memorial to Gibbon in Arbuthnott kirkyard

Lewis Grassic Gibbon, an author remembered for his novels about life in the Mearns, grew up at Bloomfield in the parish of Arbuthnott. His grave lies in the corner of the Arbuthnott Church graveyard. A small museum in the hamlet is dedicated to him, named the Lewis Grassic Gibbon Centre. This is built as an extension to the village hall, and contains an exhibition about the author and his work. The centre also contains a café, and post office facilities.

Arbuthnott House, the seat of the Viscount of Arbuthnott, is near the hamlet.

== Prehistory and archaeology ==
In 2004, CFA Archaeology conducted archaeological investigations next to the hamlet in advance of the construction of the Aberdeen to Lochside natural gas pipeline. There they discovered the remains of four Middle Bronze Age roundhouses, one Iron Age post-built roundhouse with a souterrain entered from the house, and two medieval/post-medieval corn-drying kilns. It is thought that more houses might exist but they were outside the area that would be impacted by the pipeline and so were not excavated.

== History ==
Due to its rural location, electric lighting only came to the community in 1954.

Being situated close to the larger community of Bervie, and with a small population locally in Arbuthnott, most of the amenities in the area have closed. These include the former Arbuthnott Economic Store, the local post office and primary school. The local shop closed in December 1995, with the post office services being incorporated into the Grassic Gibbon Centre in September 1997. Arbuthnott Primary School closed in November 1973.

The Arbuthnott Village Hall was opened in 1908. The hall was further extended with the building of the Grassic Gibbon Centre in 1992. It was officially opened on 11th September 1992.

There is the ruins of the Arbuthnott Mill located near Arbuthnott Church. It was built in 1839, and was working until the beginning of the 1900s. The mill wheel was removed in the mid-1990s and is now situated in front of the Old School.

== Arbuthnott House ==
Designations

Inventory of Gardens and Designed Landscapes in Scotland
- Official name: Arbuthnott House
- Designated: 30 June 1987
- Reference no.: GDL00016

The existing house incorporates sections of a 13th/14th century castle built by the Arbuthnott family, and was greatly expanded in the 15th century when a courtyard was created at its base. A range was built on the side of the courtyard in the 16th century. In the 1750s the entrance was adjusted and the overall composition remodelled to create a symmetrical arrangement. A fine plaster ceiling of 1685 is one of the more important internal features.

== Notable people ==
- John Arbuthnot (1667–1735), often known simply as Dr Arbuthnot, Scottish physician, satirist and polymath
- The Most Rev. George Gleig (1753–1840), Primus of the Scottish Episcopal Church
- The Very Rev. Samuel Trail (1806–1887), minister of the parish 1841–44 and Moderator of the General Assembly in 1874
- The Very Rev. Alexander Arbuthnot (poet), minister of the parish and Moderator of the General Assembly in 1573 and 1577.

== Listed buildings ==
Within the community of Arbuthnott, there are a number of listed buildings and structures:

1. Arbuthnott House - category A
2. Arbuthnott House - Doocot - category C(s)
3. Arbuthnott House - East Gate - category B
4. Arbuthnott House - Garden House - category B
5. Arbuthnott House - Ice House - category B
6. Arbuthnott House Mains Farm - category B
7. Arbuthnott House Sundial - category B
8. Arbuthnott House, North Bridge over Arbuthnott Burn - category A
9. Arbuthnott Parish Kirk - category A
10. Former Arbuthnott Church Manse (Kilternan) - Category C

More broadly, within the former parish boundaries, there are a futherer four buildings and structures which have listed status:

1. Allardyce Castle - Category A
2. Allardyce Castle - Gate Piers - Category A
3. House of Kairs - Category B
4. House of Kairs Main Farmhouse - Category B

== See also ==
- Aber and Inver as place-name elements
