= Glenbervie =

Village in Aberdeenshire, Scotland, UK

Coordinates: 56°55′N 2°23′W

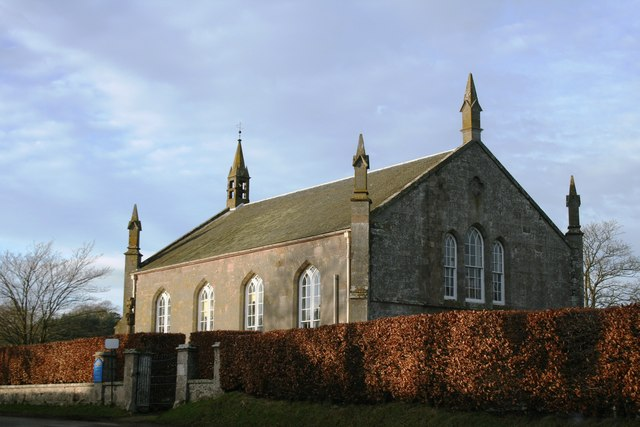
Glenbervie church

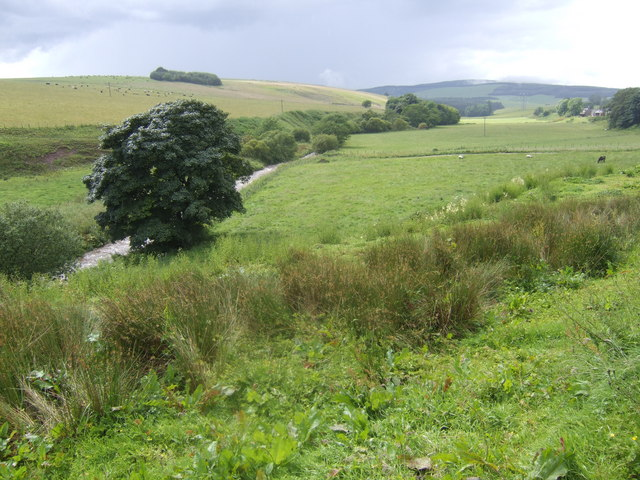
Bervie Water

Glenbervie (Scottish Gaelic: Gleann Biorbhaidh) is located in the north east of Scotland in the Howe o' the Mearns, one mile from the village of Drumlithie and eight miles south of Stonehaven in Aberdeenshire. The river Bervie runs through the village. The rural area is the location of Glenbervie House and estate. The parish was formerly named Overbervie.

The population fell from a peak of 1307 in 1796 to 887 in 1895. Many of the villagers had immigrated, especially the young to the nearby cities and towns.

The kirkyard in Glenbervie is the final resting place of the great grandparents of the noted Scottish poet Robert Burns.

== See also ==
- Droop Hill
- Drumtochty Forest
- Monboddo House
- Drumlithie
