= List of listed buildings in Inverbervie, Aberdeenshire =

This is a list of listed buildings in the parish of Inverbervie in Aberdeenshire, Scotland.

== List ==
Name	Location	Date listed	Geo-coordinates	Notes	Category	LB number	Image
Bervie Parish Kirk			56°50′42″N 2°16′49″W		B	35062	Upload another image See more images
Market Cross, Market Square			56°50′43″N 2°16′40″W		B	35066	Upload Photo
Parish Kirk - Entrance Gates			56°50′42″N 2°16′47″W		B	35063	Upload Photo
Parish Kirk Manse, King Street			56°50′42″N 2°16′47″W		C(S)	35064	Upload Photo
"Kincraig", 1 And 3 David Street			56°50′40″N 2°16′35″W		B	35068	Upload Photo
4 Market Square			56°50′44″N 2°16′39″W		C(S)	35067	Upload Photo
Old Bervie Bridge Over Bervie Water			56°50′50″N 2°16′40″W		A	35070	Upload another image See more images
Cowgate, Bridgend Including Boundary Railings			56°50′47″N 2°16′39″W		C(S)	35071	Upload Photo
Bervie Old Parish Kirk			56°50′38″N 2°16′46″W		C(S)	35069	Upload Photo
Town House, Church Street			56°50′42″N 2°16′50″W		B	35065	Upload another image See more images

== Key ==
The scheme for classifying buildings in Scotland is:

- Category A: "buildings of national or international importance, either architectural or historic; or fine, little-altered examples of some particular period, style or building type."
- Category B: "buildings of regional or more than local importance; or major examples of some particular period, style or building type, which may have been altered."
- Category C: "buildings of local importance; lesser examples of any period, style, or building type, as originally constructed or moderately altered; and simple traditional buildings which group well with other listed buildings."

In March 2016 there were 47,288 listed buildings in Scotland. Of these, 8% were Category A, and 50% were Category B, with the remaining 42% being Category C.

== See also ==
- List of listed buildings in Aberdeenshire
