= Glenbervie (ship) =

List of ships with the same or similar names

Several vessels have been named Glenbervie for Glenbervie:

- Glenbervie (1815 ship) was launched at Glasgow. Initially, she was a constant trader between Greenock and Demerara. In 1839, the New Zealand Shipping Company chartered her to carry supplies to support immigration to New Zealand. In the 1840s and 1850s, she traded more widely, sailing to Australia, the Caribbean, and South America. A fire destroyed her in August 1860.
- Glenbervie (1866 ship) was a three-masted, barque-rigged iron sailing ship launched by J.&A. Allan & Co., Glasgow. She wrecked on 13 January 1902 at Cornwall while sailing from London for Algoa Bay with general cargo.
- Glenbervie (1878 ship) was launched by Palmer's Ship Building & Iron Co., at Jarrow. In 1894 she was purchased at Kiel and renamed Sprott. In 1897, she went missing after sailing from Newport News, Virginia, for Hamburg.
- Glenbervie (1915 ship) was a steam trawler launched at Aberdeen by Hall, Russell & Company. The Admiralty requisitioned her in 1915 for service as a minesweeper. It returned her to her owners in 1919. Circa 1928 she was renamed Conquistador. The Admiralty again requisitioned her in 1939, and used her as an armed patrol vessel and then minesweeper. In 1940, she was sunk in a collision on the Thames.
