= Birnie Road Halt railway station =

Disused railway station in Benholm, Aberdeenshire

Birnie Road Halt
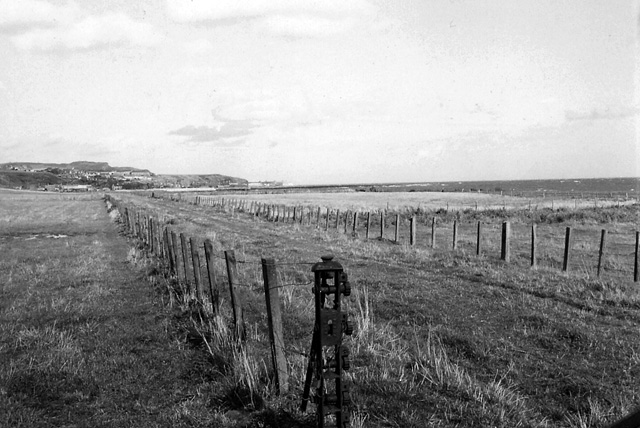
- The site of the station in 1974

General information
- Location: Benholm, Aberdeenshire; Scotland
- Coordinates: 56.8065°N 2.3126°W
- Grid reference: NO810683
- Platforms: 1

Other information
- Status: Disused

History
- Original company: Scottish North Eastern Railway
- Pre-grouping: North British Railway
- Post-grouping: London, Midland and Scottish Railway

Key dates
- 1 November 1865: Opened
- 1 October 1951: Closed to passengers
- 23 May 1966: Closed to goods
Location

Birnie Road Halt railway station served the settlement of Benholm, Aberdeenshire, Scotland from 1865 to 1966 on the Montrose and Bervie Railway.

== History ==
The station opened on 1 November 1865 by the Scottish North Eastern Railway. It was a request stop and trains only called on Fridays. It closed to both passengers on 1 October 1951 and closed to goods on 23 May 1966.

Preceding station	Disused railways	Following station
Johnshaven; Line and station closed	Scottish North Eastern Railway; Montrose and Bervie Railway	Gourdon; Line and station closed
