= Droop Hill =

Coordinates: 56.9241°N 2.4026°W

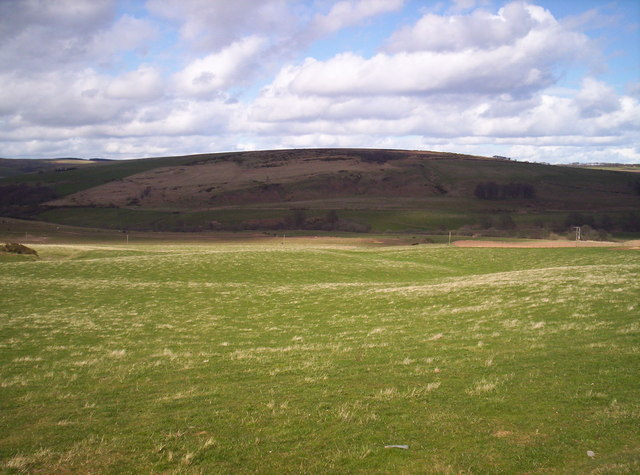
Droop Hill, Aberdeenshire. Courtesy: Dominic Dawn Harry and Jacob Paterson

Droop Hill is a mountain landform in the Kincardine and Mearns region of Aberdeenshire, Scotland. The locale had been featured in a windfarm proposal submitted to the Aberdeenshire Council.

== See also ==
- Drumtochty Castle
- Glenbervie
