= Douglas Young (solicitor) =

Douglas Young FRSA TD DL WS (born October 1948), also known as Doug Young, is a former Scottish solicitor and reserve British Army officer.

Young was born in Inverness, Scotland, and educated at Inverness Royal Academy (when that school had a primary department), Drumtochty Castle School, Fettes College, and the University of Aberdeen.

Young was a practising solicitor from 1973 to 2002, both in local government (Moray District Council and Highland Regional Council) and in private practice. He has been a Member of the Council of the Scottish Law Agents' Society. He remains a non-practising Writer to the Signet.

Young enlisted in the British Territorial Army in 1966, being commissioned into the Scottish Division in 1970. He served in the 52nd Lowland Volunteers (now 52nd Lowland, 6th Battalion The Royal Regiment of Scotland) from 1970 to 1973, the 51st Highland Volunteers (now 51st Highland, 7th Battalion The Royal Regiment of Scotland) from 1973 to 1989, and a central pool of staff officers from 1989 to 2002, assigned for much of that period to 20th Armoured Brigade.

In December 1990 Young was granted a Short Service Volunteer Commission in his affiliated regiment the Queen's Own Highlanders (Seaforth and Camerons), serving in the Headquarters of 1st Armoured Division throughout Operation Granby in Saudi Arabia, Iraq and Kuwait.

In 1996 he served in IFOR with HQ ARRC based in Sarajevo, Bosnia and Herzegovina. He was promoted to the rank of Lieutenant Colonel the same year, and served 1996-97 as a senior liaison officer to HQ SFOR in Sarajevo.

In 1998 Young returned to the Balkans for elections in Bosnia and Herzegovina, and again as a member of the United Kingdom Kosovo Diplomatic Observer Mission, subsequently merged in the Kosovo Verification Mission of the Organization for Security and Co-operation in Europe (OSCE). He worked mainly in the Orahovac and Mališevo municipalities. He was the originator of a plan to take local staff of any ethnicity, such as interpreters, to their nominated places of safety in the event of the Mission's withdrawal to Macedonia. This duly took place in March 1999. Young then became an OSCE Human Rights officer working with refugees and potential witnesses near the Macedonia/Kosovo border, and in Skopje.

Before retiring from the reserve forces in 2002, Young served a final tour with KFOR as a senior liaison officer to the Kosovo Protection Corps.

He has given evidence as a certified expert witness before the Immigration Appeal Tribunal.

Young is the author of "Silence in the Ranks", an analysis of difficulties encountered by members of the British Armed Forces and their families in participating in the UK General Election of 2005, with recommendations which were largely reflected in the Electoral Administration Act 2006.

Young was one of the founders of the British Armed Forces Federation (BAFF) in late 2006, and was a frequent spokesperson on behalf of that organisation. In 2007 he co-authored an article which highlighted the Military Covenant between the Nation and the Army and, by extension, the Royal Navy and Royal Air Force. He participated in a Council of Europe working group on Human Rights of Members of the Armed Forces.

Young was appointed Vice Lord-Lieutenant of the Inverness Lieutenancy (Inverness, Badenoch, Lochaber and Strathspey) on 24 July 2015.

== See also ==
- "Fighting for Soldiers on the Front Line", The Inverness Courier, 14 March 2008 (accessed Mar 2008)
