= Reg Morrison =

Scottish footballer

Personal information
- Date of birth: 14 September 1932
- Place of birth: Gourdon, Scotland
- Date of death: 28 November 2006 (aged 74)
- Place of death: Aberdeen, Scotland
- Position: Goalkeeper

Senior career*
Years	Team	Apps	(Gls)
- Lewis United
1951–1959	Aberdeen	66	(0)
1959	Dundee	0	(0)
1959–1960	Stirling Albion	29	(0)
- Deveronvale
Total		282	(0)

International career
1956	Scotland U23	1	(0)
- * Club domestic league appearances and goals

Reginald Low Morrison (14 September 1932–28 November 2006) was a Scottish professional footballer who played as a goalkeeper.

== Career ==
Born in Gourdon, Morrison played for Lewis United, Aberdeen, Dundee, Stirling Albion and Deveronvale.

He was capped at under-23 level by Scotland, playing a friendly away game against England at Hillsborough on 8 February 1956. This was to be his only cap for the national team.

== Personal life ==
He died in Aberdeen on 28 November 2006.

== Career statistics ==
Appearances and goals by club, season and competition
Club	Seasons	League			Scottish Cup		League Cup		Europe		Total	
Club	Seasons	Division	Apps	Goals	Apps	Goals	Apps	Goals	Apps	Goals	Apps	Goals
Aberdeen	1952–53	Scottish Division One	2	0	0	0	0	0	0	0	2	0
Aberdeen	1953–54	Scottish Division One	5	0	0	0	3	0	0	0	8	0
Aberdeen	1954–55	Scottish Division One	2	0	0	0	0	0	0	0	2	0
Aberdeen	1955–56	Scottish Division One	2	0	0	0	0	0	0	0	2	0
Aberdeen	1956–57	Scottish Division One	8	0	2	0	4	0	0	0	14	0
Aberdeen	1957–58	Scottish Division One	24	0	3	0	0	0	0	0	27	0
Aberdeen	1958–59	Scottish Division One	23	0	1	0	6	0	0	0	30	0
Aberdeen	Total		66	0	6	0	13	0	0	0	85	0
