= Gourdon railway station (NBR) =

Disused railway station in Gourdon, Aberdeenshire

Gourdon

General information
- Location: Gourdon, Aberdeenshire; Scotland
- Coordinates: 56.8286°N 2.2846°W
- Grid reference: NO827708
- Platforms: 1

Other information
- Status: Disused

History
- Original company: Scottish North Eastern Railway
- Pre-grouping: North British Railway
- Post-grouping: London, Midland and Scottish Railway

Key dates
- 1 November 1865: Opened
- 1 October 1951: Closed
Location

Gourdon railway station served the village of Gourdon, Aberdeenshire, Scotland from 1865 to 1951 on the Montrose and Bervie Railway.

== History ==
The station opened on 1 November 1865 by the Scottish North Eastern Railway. It closed to both passengers and goods traffic on 1 October 1951.

Preceding station	Disused railways	Following station
Birnie Road Halt; Line and station closed	Scottish North Eastern Railway; Montrose and Bervie Railway	Bervie; Line and station closed
