= Alexander Arbuthnot (poet) =

Scottish poet

- Born: 1538; Aberdeenshire
- Died: 16 October 1583 (aged 44–45)
- Resting place: King's College Chapel, Aberdeen, Scotland
- Education: University of St Andrews University of Bourges
- Occupations: Poet, clergyman and academic
- Movement: Scottish Reformation

Alexander Arbuthnot (1538–16 Oct 1583) was a Scottish ecclesiastic poet, "an eminent divine, and zealous promoter of the Protestant Reformation in Scotland". He was Moderator of the General Assembly of the Church of Scotland (the highest position in the Church of Scotland) in both 1573 and 1577.

== Family life ==
He was the third son of Andrew Arbuthnot of Pitcarles Farm, who in turn was the fifth son of Sir Robert Arbuthnot of Arbuthnot (died 1505/1506) - the 12th laird of Arbuthnott. His mother was Elizabeth Strachan (died 23 July 1542), daughter of Alexander Strachan of Thornton. He had three siblings, Robert, George and Katherine.

== Career ==
After having studied languages and philosophy at the University of St Andrews, and civil law under the noted Jacques Cujas at the University of Bourges in France, Arbuthnot took ecclesiastical orders, and became in his own country a zealous supporter of the Reformation.

He was declared apt and able to teach by the first General Assembly of the Church of Scotland on 20 December 1560.

On 7 July 1568, the General Assembly commissioned him to revise a book called the 'Fall of the Roman Kirk,' which had been suppressed (pending certain amendments) by the ecclesiastical authorities, as containing matters injurious to the interests of the kirk. Later that month, on 15 July 1568, he became minister of Logie-Buchan.

A year later, on 23 July 1569 he was elected principal of King's College, Aberdeen, in place of Alexander Anderson who had been rejected for popery. This was an office he retained until his death. It is recorded that he was also minister at Forvie, and Arbuthnott two days later on 25 July 1569.

On 6 August 1573, he was elected Moderator of the General Assembly, and was again elected to the position when the General Assembly met in Edinburgh on 1 April 1577.

From his previous charges, he translated to Old Machar Church in 1574. In late 1582, or early 1583, he moved to become Minister of St Andrews.

He played an active part in the church politics of the period, and was twice Moderator of the General Assembly of the Church of Scotland, and a member of the commission of inquiry into the condition of the University of St Andrews (1583).

His attitude on public questions earned him the condemnation of Catholic writers. He is not included in Nicol Burne's list of periurit apostatis, but his policy and influence were disliked by James VI, who, when the Assembly had elected Arbuthnot to the charge of the kirk of St. Andrews, ordered him to return to his duties at King's College.

== Death and legacy ==
It is thought that this displeasure by the King was a cause for his decline in health. He died, unmarried, aged forty-four on 16 October 1583 and is buried in the Kirk of St Nicholas in central Aberdeen just in front of the pulpit. Andrew Melville wrote his epitaph.

There is a memorial stone dedicated in memory to him on the north wall of Arbuthnott Church close to the pulpit.

== Works ==
He was a zealous patron of learning, a poet and mathematician. He strived to promote literature among those he ministered to. His extant poetical works are three poems, The Praises of Wemen (4 lines), On Luve (10 lines), and The Miseries of a Pure (poor) Scholar (189 lines). The praise of women in the first poem is exceptional in the literature of his age; and its geniality helps us to understand the author's popularity with his contemporaries.

He wrote a volume entitled 'Orations on the Origins and Dignity of the Law', Orationes de origine et dignitate juris, 4to. (Edinburgh, 1572).

In around 1567, he also wrote a Latin account of the history of the Arbuthnott family, Originis et Incrementi Arbuthnoticae Familiae Descriptio Historica, held in Aberdeen University Library in a volume containing a contemporary translation into Scots by William Morrison. An English continuation of the Arbuthnott history, by Dr John Arbuthnot, is preserved in the Advocates Library, Edinburgh.
