= Glenbervie House =

House in Aberdeenshire, Scotland

- Glenbervie Castle
- Glenbervie, Kincardine and Mearns, Scotland

Site information
- Open to the public: Unknown

Location
- Coordinates: 56.914°N 2.383°W

Designations

Inventory of Gardens and Designed Landscapes in Scotland
- Official name: Glenbervie House
- Designated: 1 July 1987
- Reference no.: GDL00194

Glenbervie House is a mansion house, which has incorporated parts of an earlier castle, located near Glenbervie, Kincardine and Mearns, Scotland.

== History ==
A castle existed in the 13th century, owned by the Melville family which originally controlled a number of trackways over the Mounth. King Edward I of England stayed one night in 1296 at the castle, during his invasion of Scotland on his way to Aberdeen. Alterations were undertaken in the 14th century. The castle passed by the heiress Elizabeth Melville to the Auchinleck family in 1468 and by the heiress Elizabeth Auchinleck to the Douglas family in 1496.

Further alterations were undertaken in the 15th century. Adam Gordon of Auchindoun laid siege to Glenbervie in 1572 and captured the castle during the Marian civil war. The castle was sold in 1675 to Robert Burnett of Leys. Further alterations were undertaken in 1700, as well as 1854.
