= Craiginour =

Hill

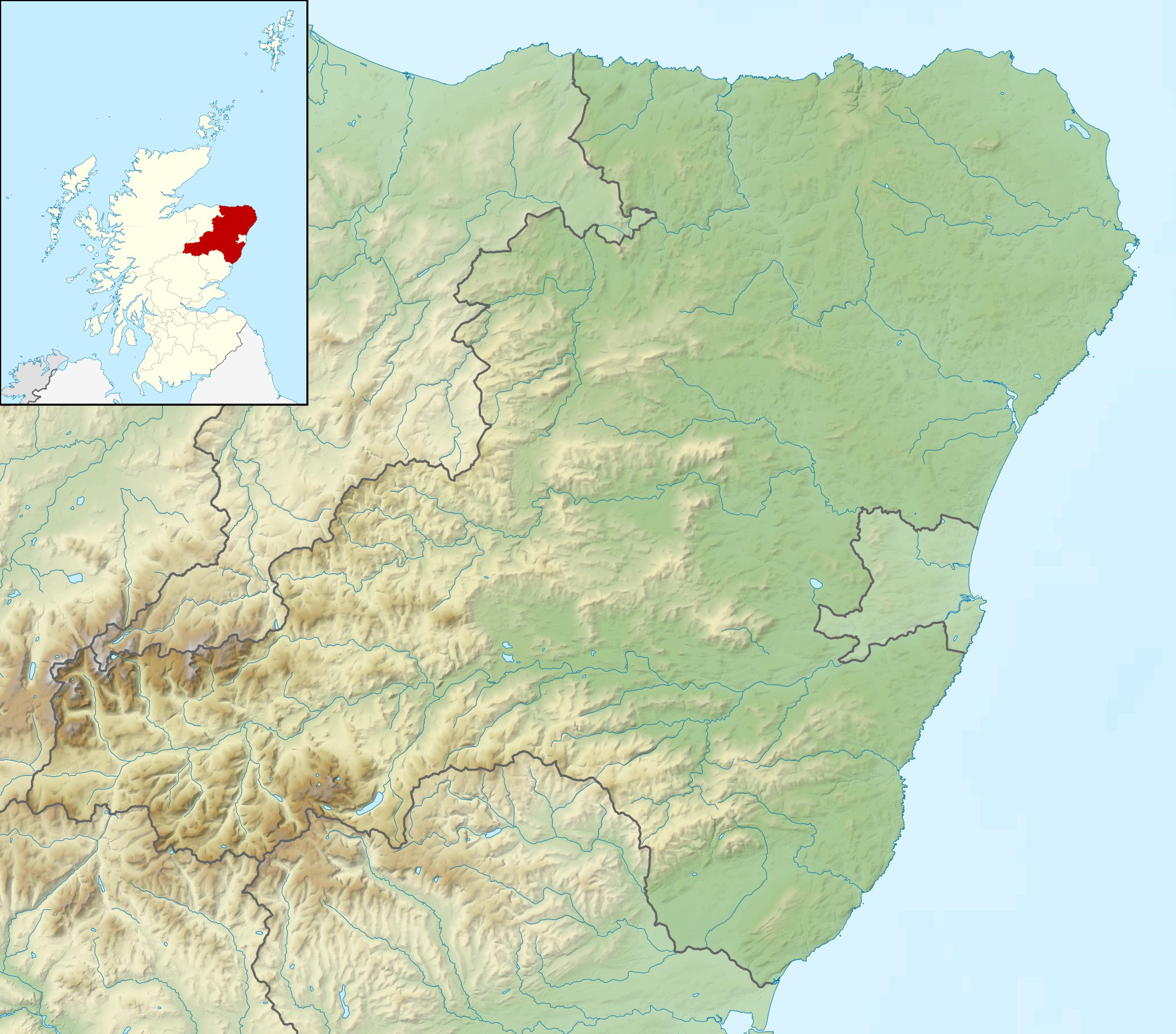
- Location within Aberdeenshire

Highest point
- Elevation: 355 m (1,165 ft)
- Coordinates: 56.9714°N 2.4203°W

Geography
- Location: Aberdeenshire, Scotland, UK

Craiginour is a hill located near Cowie Water in Stonehaven, Aberdeenshire, Scotland. Its summit is at 355 metres (1,165 ft).

Its nearest city is Aberdeen
