= Benholm Mill =

Mill in Aberdeenshire, Scotland

Coordinates: 56°48′46″N 2°19′08″W

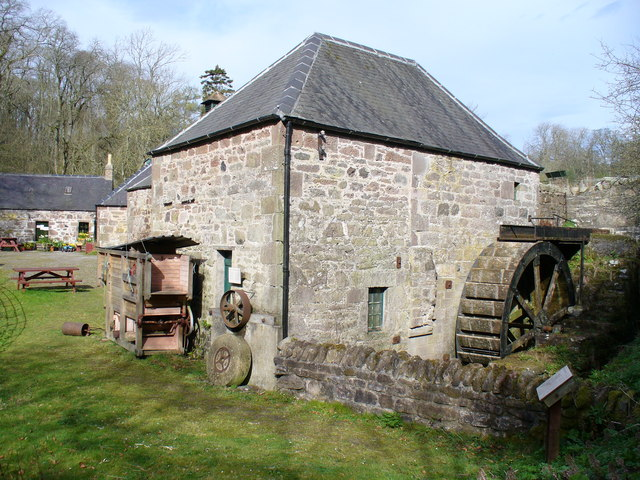
The Mill of Benholm

Mill of Benholm in Kincardineshire, Scotland, is a restored and fully working water-powered meal mill. It is sited in ancient woodland near Johnshaven (13 miles south of Stonehaven), by the farmlands of Sunset Song country, made famous by local author Lewis Grassic Gibbon. It featured as Long Rob's Mill in the television serialisation of this novel. It is a category A listed building. It is owned by the Mill of Benholm Enterprise, and formally by Aberdeenshire Council.

== History ==
Benholm is now the only surviving traditional water-powered meal mill in this part of Aberdeenshire. For hundreds of years it and numerous similar mills throughout Scotland were of vital importance to the rural community as the suppliers of the main food item. At its peak it produced oatmeal, bruised oats and hashed oats for an area extending from Montrose in the south to Barras and Catterline in the north and inland to Laurencekirk and Fordoun.

== Current status ==
The mill building was in partial use until 1982 and was gradually restored to its present state from 1986 onwards. Parts of it date back to the 18th century, though there are records of milling at Benholm as early as the 13th century. Other buildings on site are of mainly Victorian origin. The whole complex, with mill dam, reed bed, miller's croft and woodland walk, is now a local heritage visitor centre. The mill used to belong to Mr Lindsay Watson. Benholm itself today is a small hamlet made up of the former Benholm Parish Church (which is open to the public to view), the mill visitor centre & cafe and private dwellings.

The Mill of Benholm Trust worked with Aberdeenshire Council to provide work experience and training for adults with special needs, in catering, horticulture, furniture restoration, shop and office work. In 1995, the Mill of Benholm opened to the public as a visitor attraction. However, in April 2014 the mill closed due to a number of health and safety issues. Since 2014, it has been largely mothballed.

The Mill of Benholm Enterprise (SCIO), a local charity organisation, has worked together with the North East Scotland Preservation Trust (NESPT) to achieve an asset transfer from Aberdeenshire Council with the purpose of reopening this jewel of Mearns and Kincardineshire to the public once again and to stop any further deterioration of this A listed mill site, which was described by Historic Environment Scotland as "an exceptional and rare survival".

On 30 April 2024, the ownership of the Mill of Benholm was transferred from Aberdeenshire Council to the Mill of Benholm Enterprise, which concluded the successful Community Asset Transfer of this heritage site. An Official Handover Ceremony is due to take place at the Mill on 8 June 2024.
