= Arbuthnott, Bervie & Kinneff Parish Church =

Arbuthnott, Bervie and Kinneff Church
- ABK Church
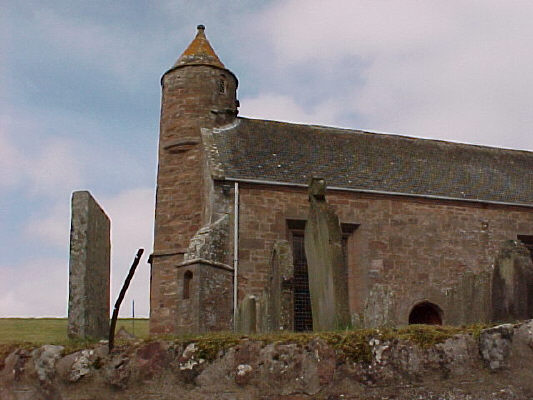
- Arbuthnott church in 2000
- Arbuthnott, Bervie and Kinneff Church
- Location: Inverbervie (Arbuthnott and Old Kineff churches solely located within namesake areas)
- Denomination: Church of Scotland
- Tradition: Evangelical
- Churchmanship: Reformed
- Website: http://www.arbuthnottbervieandkinneff.org.uk/

History
- Former name: Bervie Church
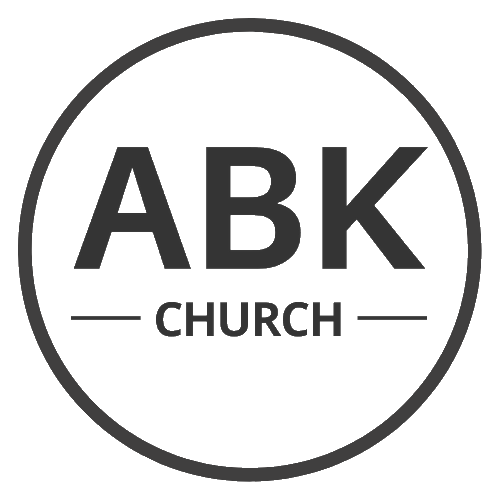

Arbuthnott, Bervie and Kinneff Church (known as ABK Church) is a Christian community in the south of Aberdeenshire. It includes the town of Inverbervie, the villages of Catterline, Gourdon and Kinneff in addition to the area of Arbuthnott. The Church Minister is Andrew Morrison

== Formation ==
Originally the three churches were entirely separate parishes, however Arbuthnott and Bervie have shared a minister before having a joint Kirk Session in the last decade. Kinneff was linked with Stonehaven South Parish Church before joining Arbuthnott and Bervie in order for Stonehaven South Parish Church to be linked with Stonehaven Dunnottar Parish Church..

== Arbuthnott Church ==
Located in the estate of Arbuthnott, the church is one of the oldest churches still in use for regular public worship in Scotland dating back to the pre-reformation days. Consecrated in 1242 the church was dedicated to the memory of St Ternan. The oldest part of the building is the chancel, with the rest of the building added around 1500. After the reformation the first minister was a member of the Arbuthnott family, who later went on to become a moderator of the Church of Scotland.

== Bervie Church ==
Inverbervie is the largest church within the parish with around 70 people attending worship every Sunday. The current church building, located in the centre of town, opened in 1837. The pipe organ was installed in 1904 and new stained glass doors designed by the pupils of Bervie School were added to mark the millennium.

== Kinneff Church ==
Kinneff, despite its relatively small size, is home to two church buildings. The Kinneff Old Church, now owned and managed by Kinneff Old Church Trust, as well as the newer Kinneff Church, built originally as a Free Church. The former was closed in the middle of the 20th Century. After a congregational meeting in April 2010 it was decided to close the newer Kinneff Church also. Kinneff Church closed on Sunday 13 June 2010, and has now been converted into residential housing.
