= Arbuthnott Parish Kirk =

- St. Ternan's Kirk
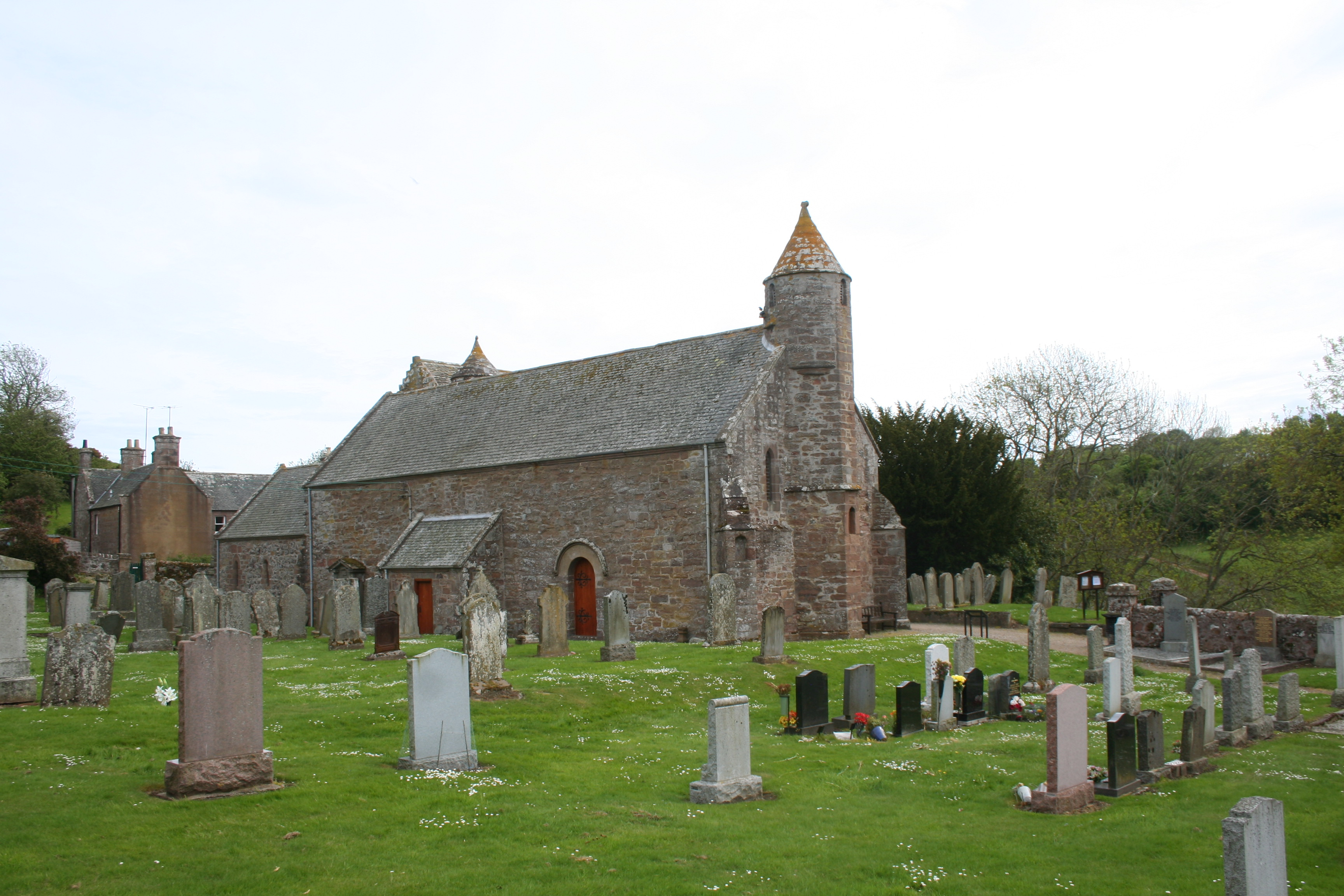
- The church in 2011
- Arbuthnott Parish Kirk
- 56°51′46″N 2°19′38″W
- Location: Arbuthnott, Aberdeenshire
- Country: Scotland
- Denomination: Church of Scotland
- Previous denomination: Catholic Church
- Website: www.abkchurch.co.uk

History
- Status: Open

Architecture
- Functional status: Active
- Heritage designation: Grade A listed
- Completed: 13th century

Specifications
- Capacity: Approx 80

Administration
- Parish: Arbuthnott

Arbuthnott Parish Kirk is a church in Arbuthnott, Aberdeenshire, Scotland. Now a Category A listed building, it was built in at least the 13th century, from which time the nave and chancel survive. A west front and bell turret were added later. It was restored in 1896 by Alexander Marshall Mackenzie.

The congregation is part of the combined parish of Arbuthnott, Bervie and Kinneff Parish Church. Worship takes place in Arbuthnott Church every Sunday at 9:30am.
