= Gourdon, Aberdeenshire =

Coordinates: 56°49′42″N 2°17′10″W

Gourdon: Scots: Gurdin
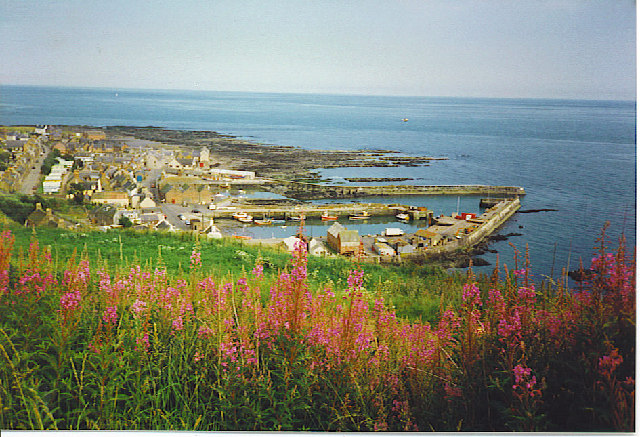
- Gourdon overlook

- Location within Aberdeenshire
- Population: 850 (2020)
- OS grid reference: NO825707
- Council area: Aberdeenshire
- Lieutenancy area: Kincardineshire
- Country: Scotland
- Sovereign state: United Kingdom
- Post town: MONTROSE
- Postcode district: DD10
- Police: Scotland
- Fire: Scottish
- Ambulance: Scottish
- UK Parliament: West Aberdeenshire and Kincardine
- Scottish Parliament: Angus North and Mearns

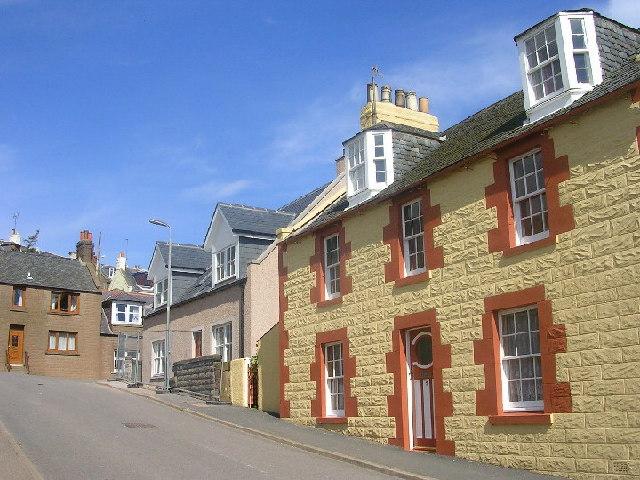
Gourdon homes

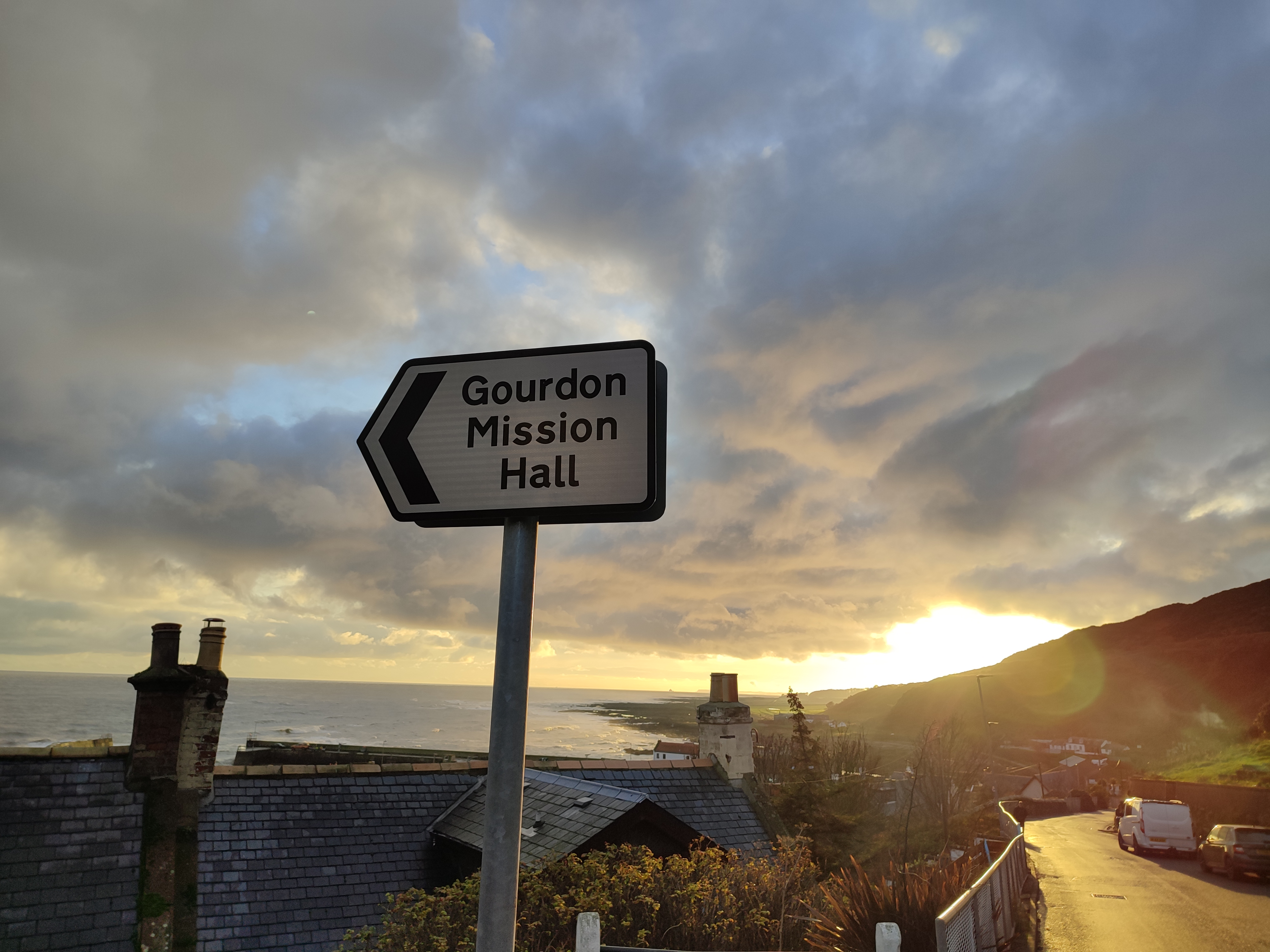
Gourdon Mission Hall signpost

Gourdon (/ˈɡʊərdən/) nicknamed Gurdin by the population, is a coastal fishing village in Aberdeenshire, Scotland, south of Inverbervie and north of Johnshaven, with a natural harbour. Its harbour was built in 1820. It was formerly in Kincardineshire. It is known for its close community and unique local dialect. It is a picturesque harbour village that boasts lovely views along the pathway to Inverbervie.

== History ==
=== Fishing ===
Gourdon was a thriving fishing community.

Fishery Statistics

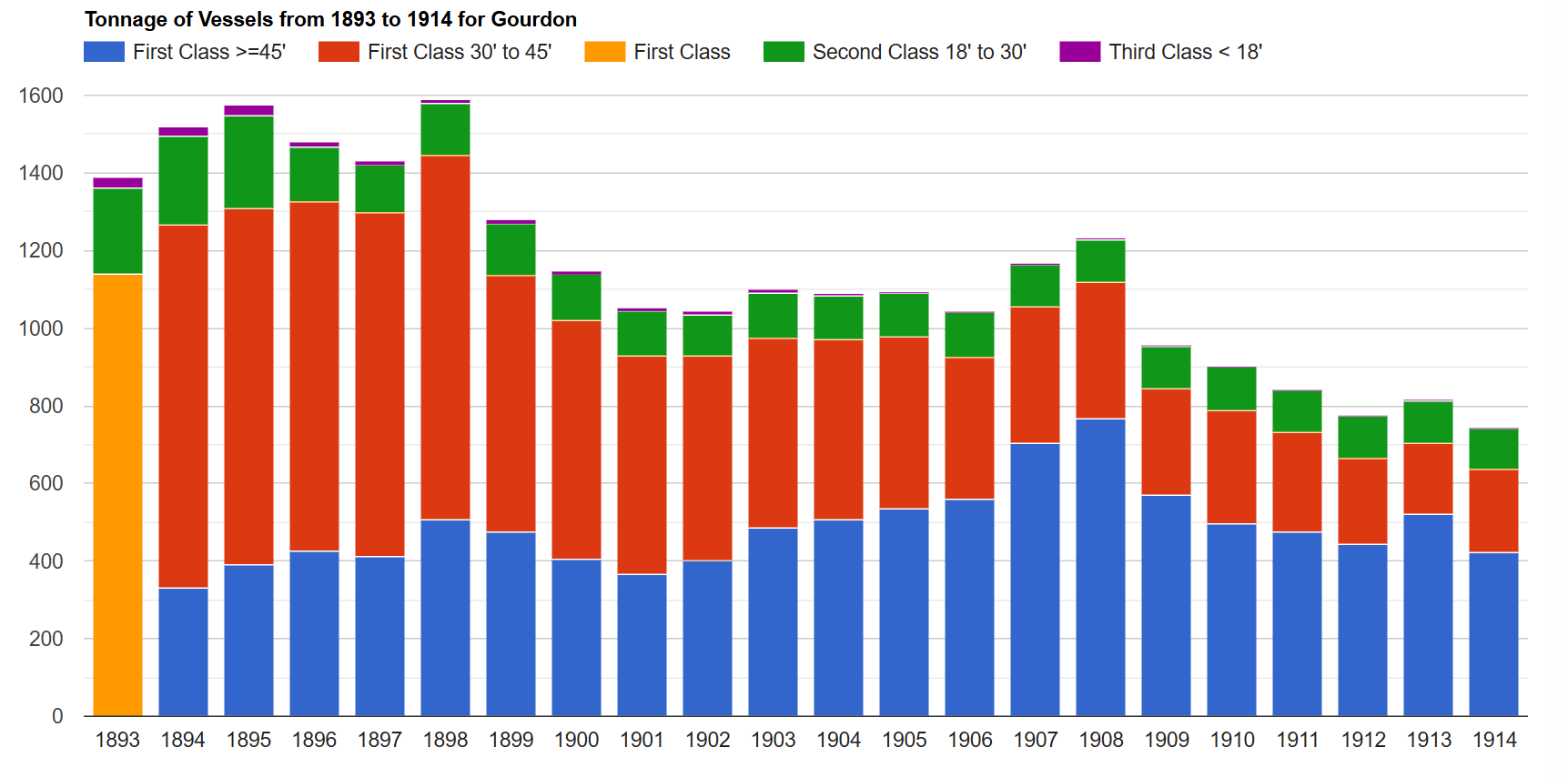
Tonnage of vessels

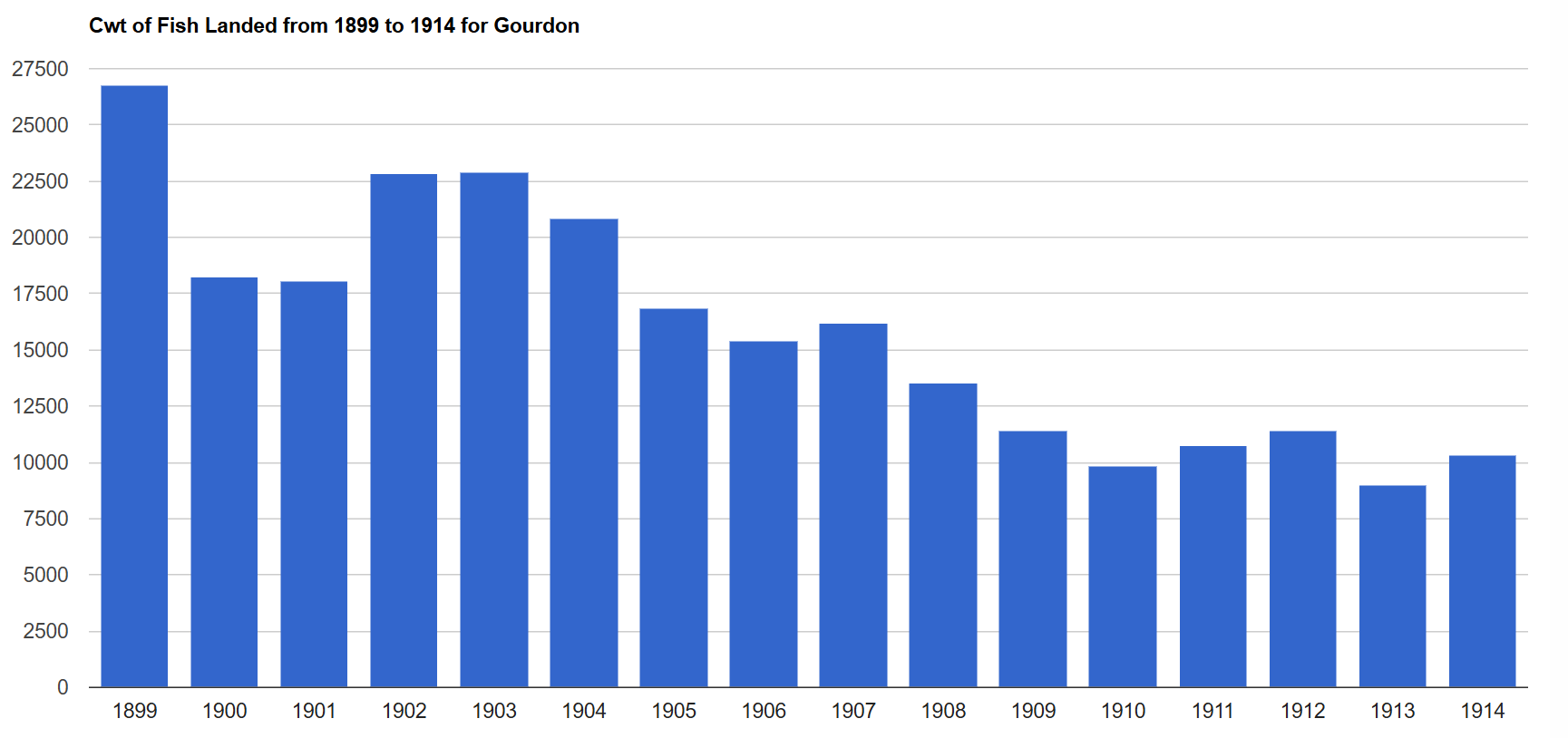
Cwt of fish landed (excluding shellfish)

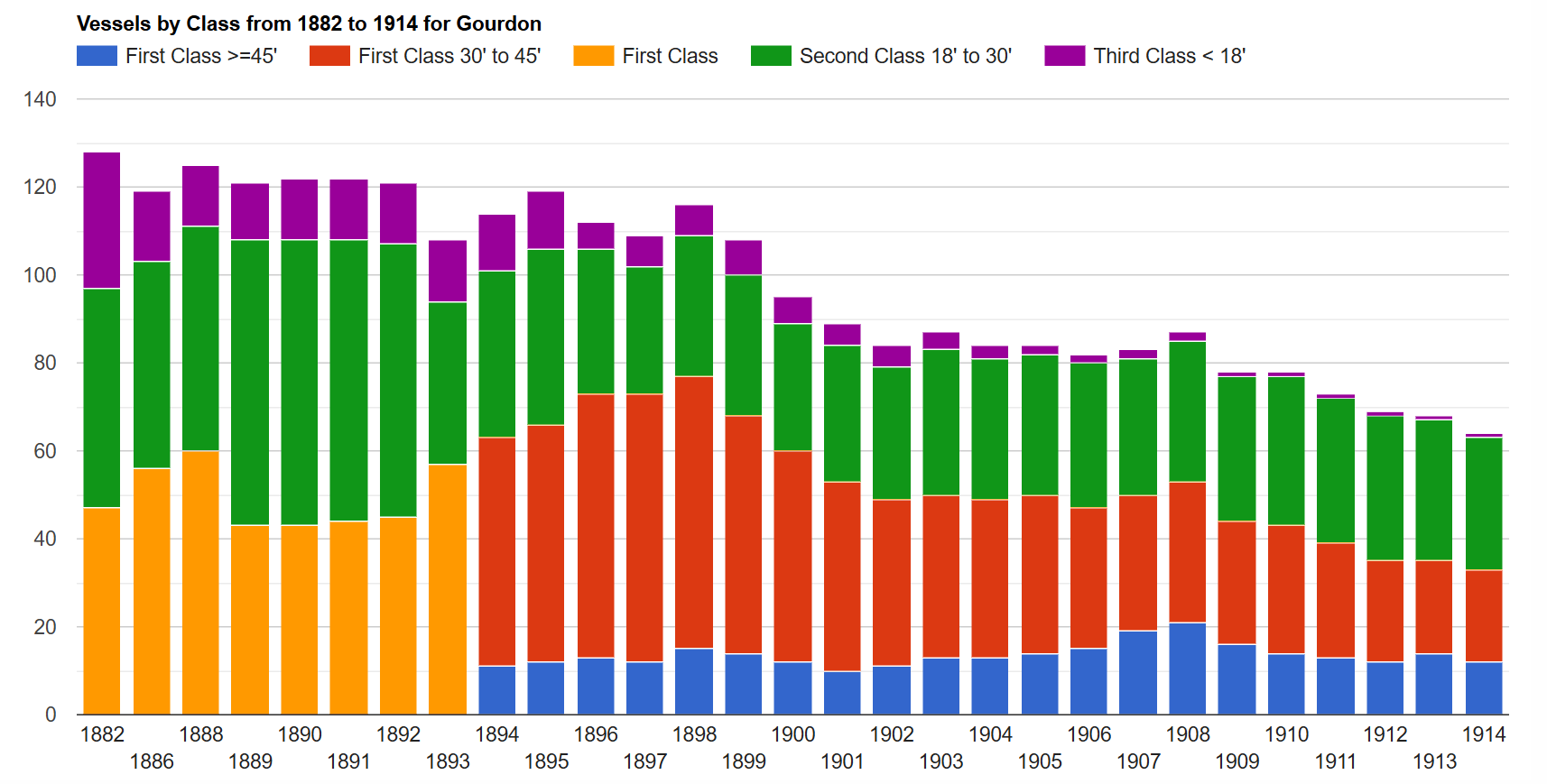
Vessels by class

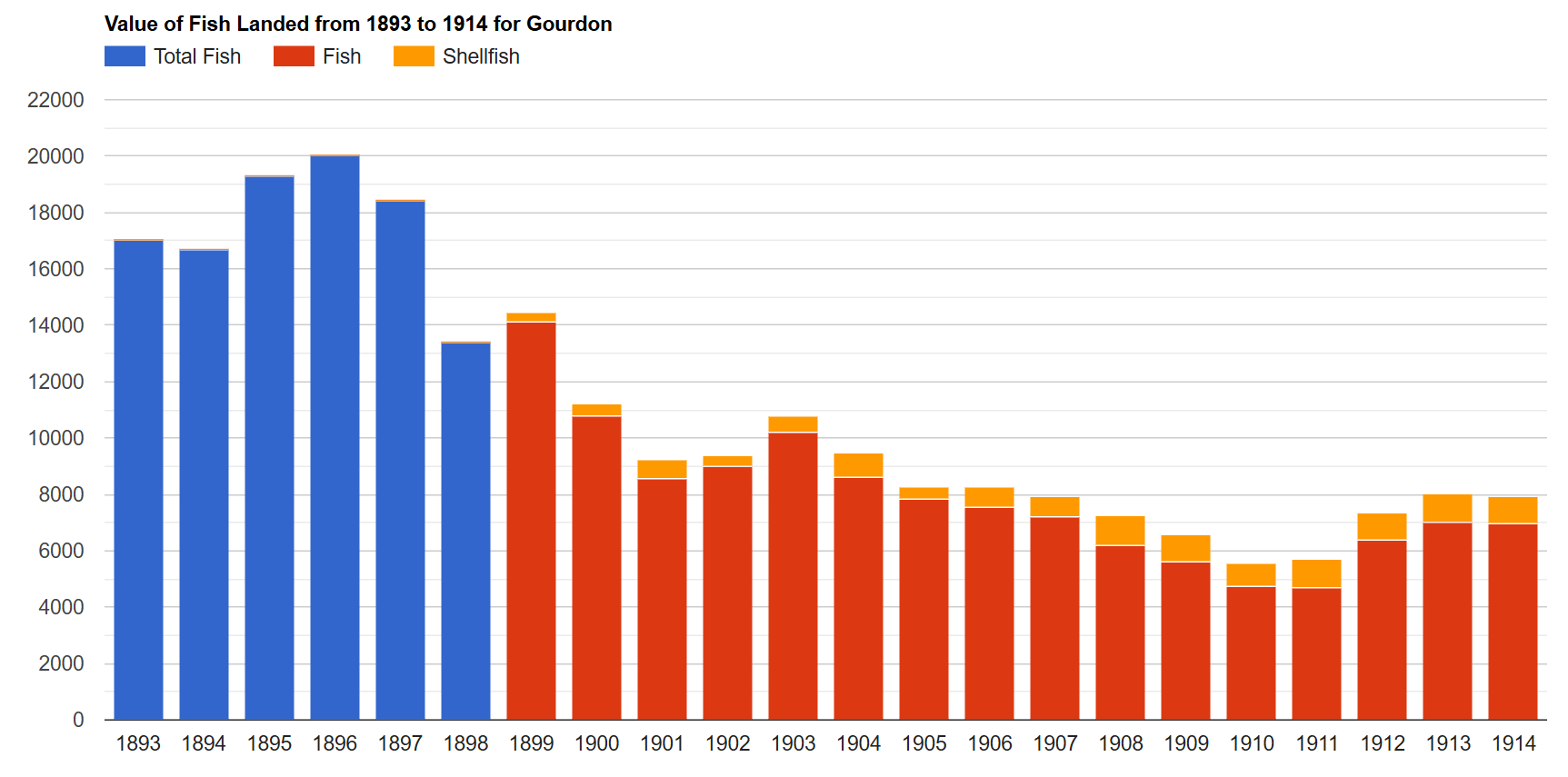
Value (£) of fish landed

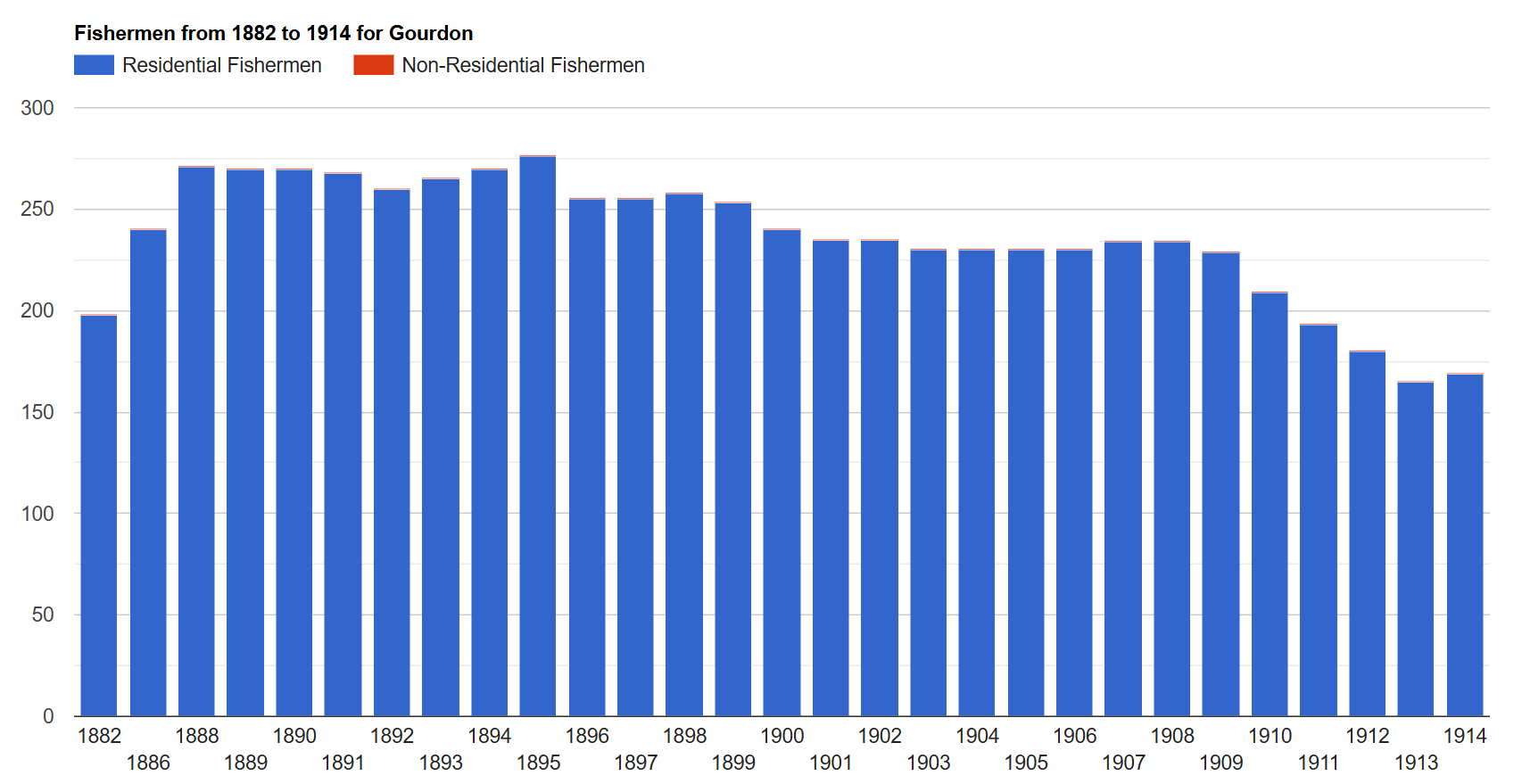
Fishermen

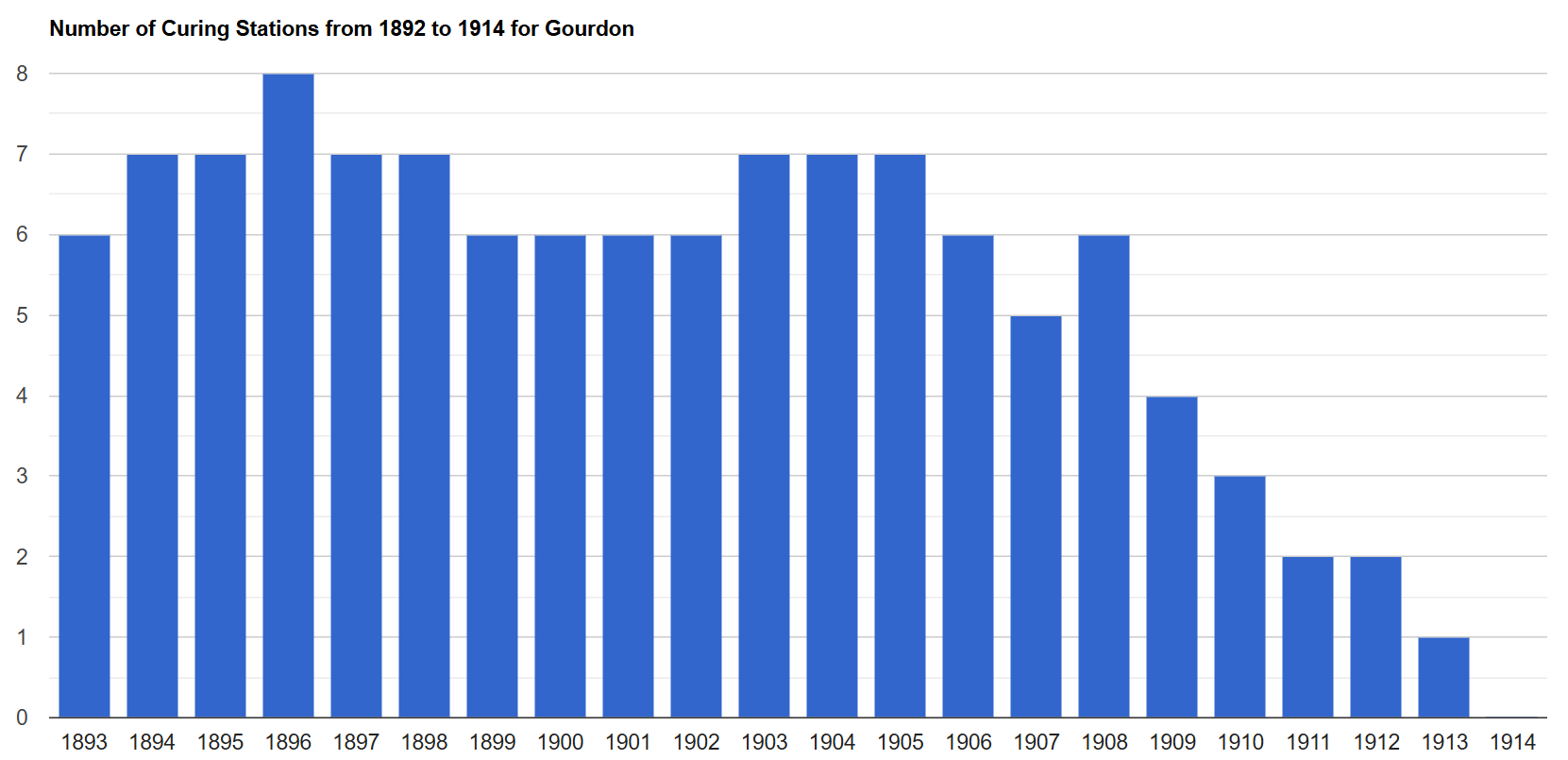
Number of curing stations

=== Lifeboats ===
The last rowing and sailing lifeboat was 'Moss; (1915-1936). in the centre of the village lies the Maggie Law Museum, named after the Maggie Law (built in 1890), which was one of the first inshore lifeboats. She was in service for 40 years and saved 36 lives. The lifeboat station closed in 1969. In 1997, the former lifeboat station opened as a museum.

=== Mills ===
The last surviving flax mill in the United Kingdom was located at Selbie Mill in Gourdon. It had formally been owned by the Sidlaw group of companies, but was latterly owned by London-based company G and F Spinners. It had opened in 1902, and it closed on 30 May 1997. At its peak, it had employed over 200 people, but was down to about 40 when it shut its doors.

=== Railway ===
Gourdon was served by Gourdon railway station, on the Montrose and Bervie Railway from 1865 to 1951.

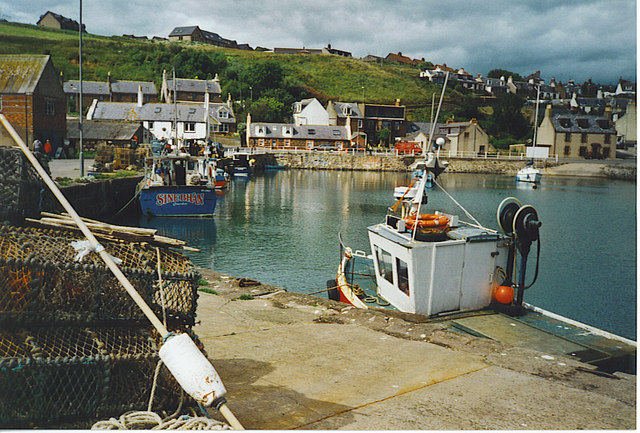
Gourdon harbour with fishing boats docked

The last corner shop in Gourdon closed in 2022. It also served as the local Post Office.

== Notable residents ==
- John Ritchie Cargill, 1892–1981, able seaman on the RMS Carpathia during the rescue after the sinking of the Titanic.
- Reg Morrison, 1932–2006. Aberdeen Football Club goalkeeper.

== Local radio ==
Alongside the commercial enterprise of the local newspaper, The Mearns Leader, Gourdon has a Local Community Radio Station in Mearns FM. Broadcasting from nearby Stonehaven in the Townhall, Mearns FM helps to keep Gourdon up to date with local and charity events, as well as playing a wee bit of music. Staffed completely by volunteers, Mearns FM is run as a not for profit organisation, broadcasting under a Community Radio licence, with a remit to provide local focus news events and programming. Jointly funded by local adverts and local and national grants. Mearns FM has one of the largest listening areas of any Community Radio Station owing to the Mearns' distributed population, Mearns FM was set up to try to bring these distant communities together.
