= Drumtochty Castle =

Castle in Aberdeenshire, Scotland

Coordinates: 56.9109°N 2.4947°W

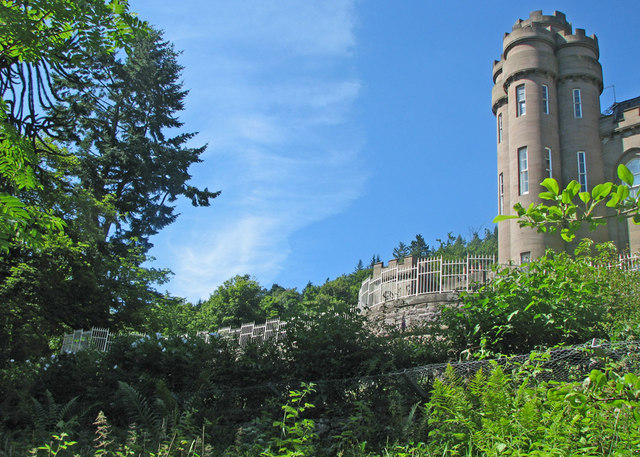
- Southwest tower of the castle in 2008

General information
- Location: Scotland

Drumtochty Castle is a neo-gothic style castellated mansion erected in 1812 approximately three kilometres north-west of Auchenblae, Kincardineshire, Scotland. This building stands on the southern edge of Drumtochty Forest.

== History ==
Drumtochty Castle was built in 1812 by the Drummond family. It was built to the designs of James Gillespie Graham with further extensions c. 1815. Although the design for the extensions was again commissioned from Gillespie Graham, the work was undertaken by the Aberdeen City Architect John Smith. Miller speculates Gillespie Graham could have had a dispute with George Drummond, the owner, but considers Smith’s closer proximity to the site is a more plausible scenario. Gillespie Graham was involved with further additions c. 1839.

The Castle was bought by Greenock Engineer James Gammell in 1822.

During the Second World War, Drumtochty Castle was bought by the Norwegian government-in-exile and used as a boarding school for Norwegian children who were refugees from the German occupation of Norway.

On 1 May 1947, Robert and Elizabeth Langlands opened a boys’ preparatory school at the Castle, having bought Drumtochty from the Norwegian government. The school closed in 1971.

Historic Scotland included the castle on the list of category A listed buildings in August 1972.

A major restoration project undertaken by Charlie and Dot Anderson over 20 years ago transformed Drumtochty Castle into a fully restored historic property. Following the completion of the works, the castle was redeveloped as a luxury venue and has since become a well established wedding destination in Scotland.

It is currently managed by Nikki Curran and Tamsin Davidson.

== School alumni ==
- Elspeth Barker (1940–2022), novelist and journalist. (One of five Langlands children)
- Ross Leckie (born 1957), writer.
- David MacLennan (1948–2014), actor, writer and producer.
- Allan Massie (born 1938), novelist, sports writer and journalist.
- Douglas Young (born 1948), solicitor.
