= Inverbervie =

Coordinates: 56.84334°N 2.28164°W

Inverbervie: Scottish Gaelic: Inbhir Bhiorbhaidh
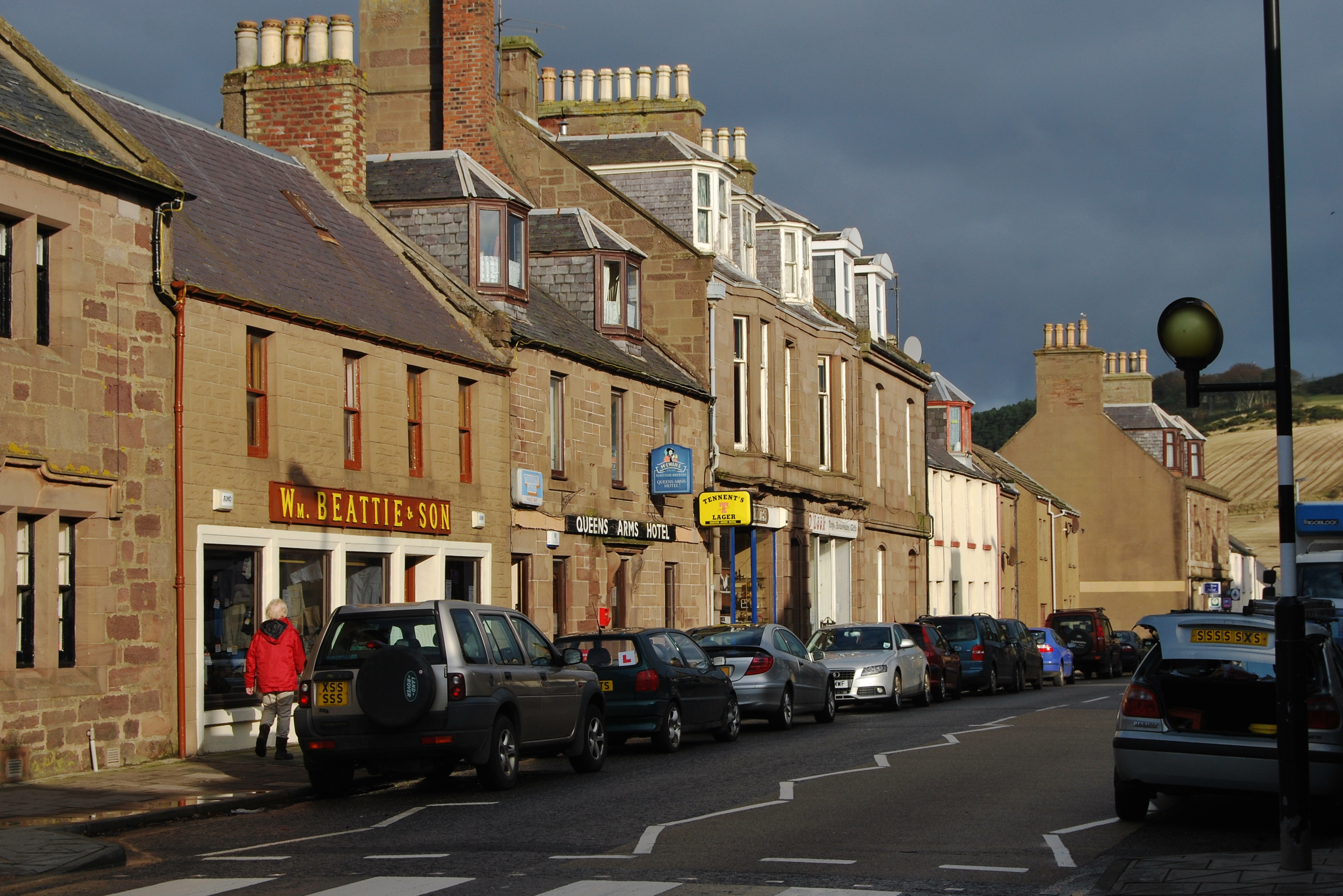
- King Street, Inverbervie

- Location within Aberdeenshire
- Population: 2,300 (2020)
- OS grid reference: NO830726
- Council area: Aberdeenshire
- Lieutenancy area: Kincardineshire
- Country: Scotland
- Sovereign state: United Kingdom
- Post town: MONTROSE
- Postcode district: DD10
- Dialling code: 01561
- Police: Scotland
- Fire: Scottish
- Ambulance: Scottish
- UK Parliament: West Aberdeenshire and Kincardine
- Scottish Parliament: Angus North and Mearns

Inverbervie (Scottish Gaelic: Inbhir Bhiorbhaidh), also known simply as Bervie, is a small town on the north-east coast of Scotland, south of Stonehaven, in the Mearns.

== Etymology ==
The name comes from Gaelic and means "mouth of Bervie Water". Historical forms, such as Haberberui, recorded in 1290, show that the Gaelic element inbhir, meaning "river mouth", has succeeded the original Brittonic element aber, with the same meaning (cf. Welsh aber). Alternative names existed for the community in earlier part of the 1200s. There was Inuirberuyn used 1204-1214, Inuerberuyn 1232-1237, Inirbervyn 1266, and Inuerberuy 1287. The name of the Bervie Water might derive its name from the Old Irish language and the word berbaim meaning 'I boil', or from Pictish analog of the root, compare Welsh berw 'boiled, boiling'. However, this may be a translation or an adaptation of an earlier pre-Celtic name.

== History ==
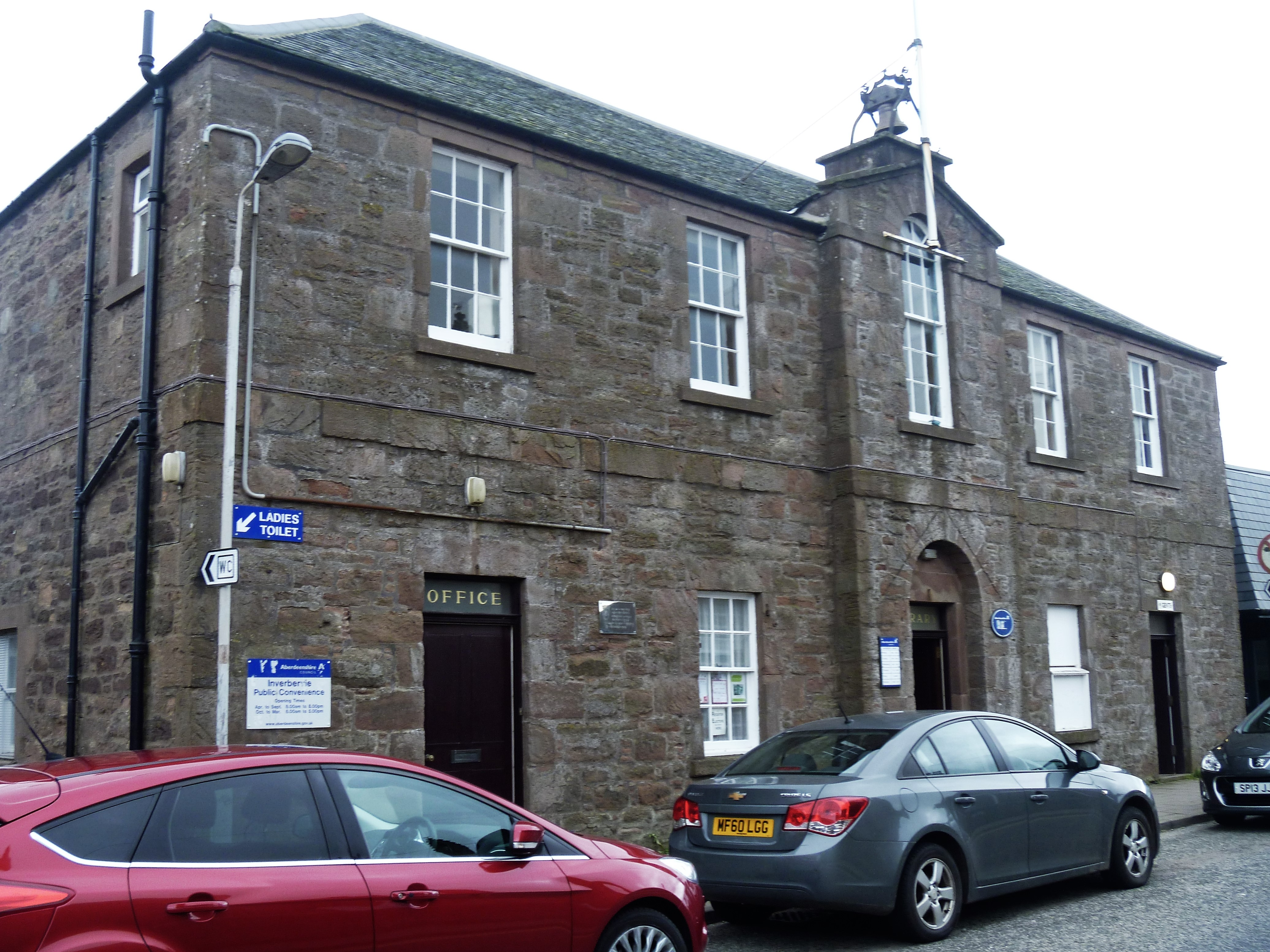
Inverbervie Town House

Inverbervie appears in written history at least as far back as the 12th century AD; in a document relating to Arbroath Abbey, Simon of Inverbervie is noted as having witnessed a charter transferring the lands of Balfeith to the Abbey. The settlement was formerly a royal burgh from 1342 to 1975 and a parliamentary burgh from 1708 to 1950, the former status being conferred by David II of Scotland for hospitality he and his Queen received when shipwrecked there the previous year when returning from exile.

The 650th anniversary celebrations of Inverbervie’s royal burgh status was held on 22 June 1992, and marked the 1342 charter traditionally linked to the storm‑driven landing of David II and Queen Margaret.

The burgh council was based at Inverbervie Town House which was rebuilt in 1840.

The town would have centered around the town square. In the centre lies the Market Cross, which was erected in 1737.

A small harbour in the town was important in early years but despite improvements by Thomas Telford in 1819, disappeared by 1830 owing to the build-up of the shingle bar at the river mouth. The first flax spinning mill in Scotland was established here at the Haughs Mill in 1787 - utilising the Bervie Water which flowed alongside them for power. By 1910, at their peak, there were eight in operation in the area - two at Haughs, Laurel Mill, two at Springworks, Lint Mill, Pitcarry and Craigview - employing up to 600 workers. The Gourdon and Inverbervie area was a hub of textile manufacturing for much of the 20th century. As a result of this, the population of the settlement peaked at over 2,500 around the turn of the 20th century but has since declined owing the downturn in that industry. The final mill in Inverbervie was the Craigview Mill which lasted until 1993, until it was closed by the Sidlaw Group. Nearby Gourdon was host to the final flax mill in the UK, closing on 30 May 1997. Much of where the former mills were are now replaced by housing, with some streets bearing the names of the former mills on the site they were built upon (e.g. Laurel Crescent and Craigview)

The town was within the county of Kincardineshire until 1975, when the county was merged into the Grampian Region. The Aberdeenshire unitary council area, which now includes Inverbervie, was created when the region system was eradicated in 1996. Aberdeenshire is also the name of another former county which was merged into the Grampian Region in 1975.

Prominent local buildings include Hallgreen Castle, founded in 1376, standing on a bluff overlooking the sea towards the southern end of the town.

The town has had a large number of houses built over the previous 25 years. Two new estates have sprung up in this time frame – the West Park Estate, and also the Brighead Estate.

== Governance ==
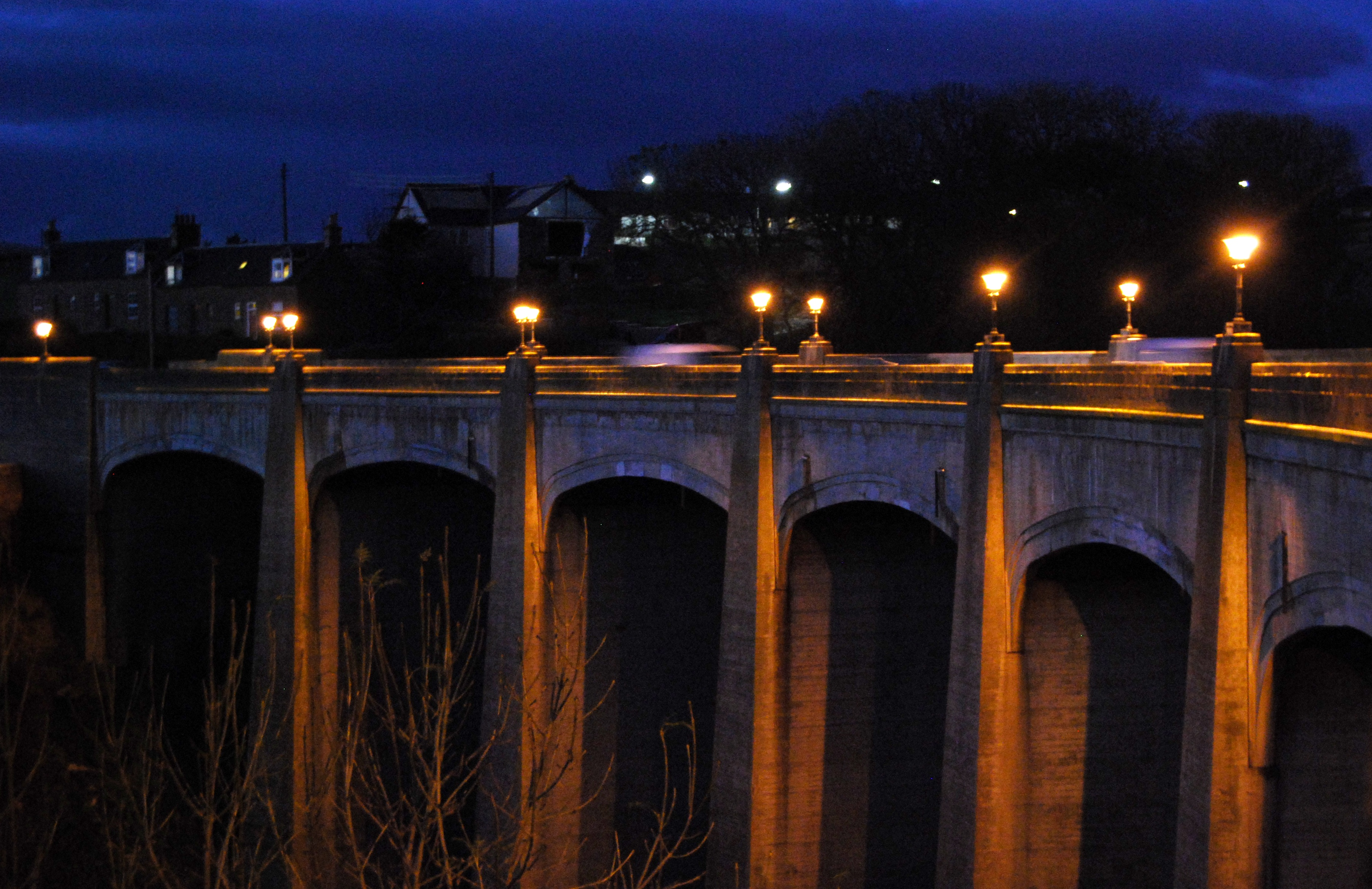
Jubilee Bridge

The parliamentary burgh which existed from 1708 to 1950 was a component of the Aberdeen district of burghs of the Parliament of Great Britain from 1708 to 1801 and of the Parliament of the United Kingdom from 1801 to 1832.

In 1832 Inverbervie became a component of the Montrose district of burghs.

In 1950 it was merged into the North Angus and Mearns constituency, served by Conservative politicians. North Angus and Mearns was replaced with new constituencies in 1983, and Inverbervie was included within Kincardine and Deeside.

From 2005, with the re-establishment of the West Aberdeenshire and Kincardine parliamentary constituency, the town has been served by Liberal Democrats (2005-2015), SNP (2015-2017) and Conservative (2017-present) politicians.

In the Scottish Parliament, the town was first represented by the Lib Dems in the West Aberdeenshire and Kincardine constituency. With the adjustment of boundaries in place for the 2011 Scottish Parliamentary elections, Inverbervie has been in the Angus North and Mearns constituency.

The town, since 2017, has been served by Conservative MP Andrew Bowie. And, in the Scottish Parliament, since 2016, the town is served by SNP MSP, Mairi Gougeon.

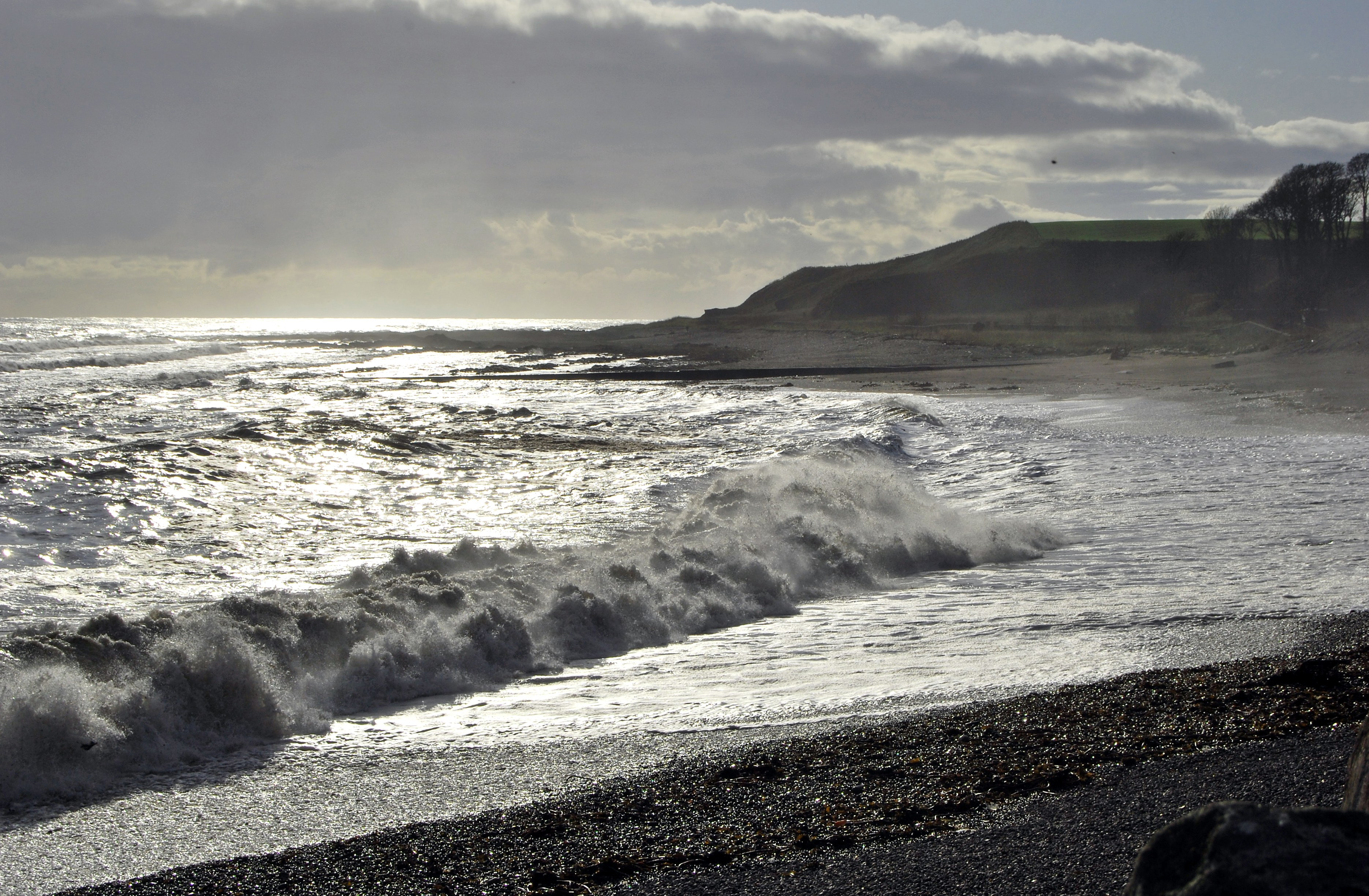
Bervie Beach

== Geography and climate ==
Inverbervie lies towards the south of the mouth of the Bervie Water, which flows into the North Sea. Bervie is on the East Coast of Scotland between Montrose and Stonehaven. It lies 8.6 miles (14km) SSE of Stonehaven; 11.7miles (19km) NE of Montrose and 7miles (11km) E of Laurencekirk. It lies on the coastal A92 road between Dundee (37miles / 60km)and Aberdeen (22 miles / 35.5km).

The town is roughly circular in shape, with almost all of the town being south of the Bervie Water, with the A92 (King Street / Montrose Road) going through the middle of the town. Most of Inverbervie is on a hill, rising up from Bervie Bay, a curving shingle beach formed into steep terraces by strong North Sea wave action. From there, the town rises on a hill again. The highest houses in the town are about 200ft above sea level. The expanse of the town extends to bordering the nearby village of Gourdon to the south, which has also expanded towards Bervie in recent years.

Like most of the United Kingdom, Inverbervie has an oceanic climate (Köppen: Cfb). with warm summers, cool winters and few extremes of temperature.

Climate data for Inverbervie (134 m or 440 ft asl, averages 1991–2020)
Month	Jan	Feb	Mar	Apr	May	Jun	Jul	Aug	Sep	Oct	Nov	Dec	Year
Record high °C (°F)	13.1 (55.6)	13.7 (56.7)	19.8 (67.6)	21.1 (70.0)	23.2 (73.8)	26.0 (78.8)	27.5 (81.5)	27.2 (81.0)	24.6 (76.3)	20.8 (69.4)	16.1 (61.0)	14.0 (57.2)	27.5 (81.5)
Mean daily maximum °C (°F)	6.0 (42.8)	6.4 (43.5)	8.1 (46.6)	9.9 (49.8)	12.4 (54.3)	14.9 (58.8)	17.0 (62.6)	17.0 (62.6)	15.0 (59.0)	11.8 (53.2)	8.5 (47.3)	6.3 (43.3)	11.1 (52.0)
Daily mean °C (°F)	3.7 (38.7)	3.9 (39.0)	5.1 (41.2)	6.9 (44.4)	9.1 (48.4)	11.8 (53.2)	13.8 (56.8)	13.9 (57.0)	12.1 (53.8)	9.2 (48.6)	6.1 (43.0)	4.0 (39.2)	8.3 (46.9)
Mean daily minimum °C (°F)	1.4 (34.5)	1.4 (34.5)	2.2 (36.0)	3.8 (38.8)	5.9 (42.6)	8.6 (47.5)	10.6 (51.1)	10.8 (51.4)	9.3 (48.7)	6.6 (43.9)	3.7 (38.7)	1.6 (34.9)	5.5 (41.9)
Record low °C (°F)	−11.1 (12.0)	−11.6 (11.1)	−8.8 (16.2)	−4.1 (24.6)	−1.9 (28.6)	1.6 (34.9)	2.7 (36.9)	1.5 (34.7)	−0.8 (30.6)	−2.7 (27.1)	−7.4 (18.7)	−10.3 (13.5)	−11.6 (11.1)
Average rainfall mm (inches)	50.0 (1.97)	45.7 (1.80)	42.2 (1.66)	47.7 (1.88)	50.2 (1.98)	58.8 (2.31)	67.3 (2.65)	65.7 (2.59)	54.8 (2.16)	85.9 (3.38)	73.4 (2.89)	61.6 (2.43)	703.4 (27.69)
Average rainy days (≥ 1 mm)	11.5	9.6	9.6	9.6	10.2	10.8	11.6	10.7	10.2	12.8	13.6	11.6	131.8
Source: Met Office

== Facilities ==
Inverbervie has The Bervie Chipper which in 1998 was awarded the title Fish & Chip Shop of the Year 1997. The Bervie Sports Centre opened in March 1989.

The community is also host to a number of shops, pubs, cafes and restaurants. There is a local General Practice, car maintenance garage, and Care Home, which uses the premises of a former hotel.

== Media ==
- The local newspaper is the Mearns Leader which is published by Johnson Press and edited in the neighbouring town of Stonehaven.
- Bervie is served by local radio station, Mearns FM. Broadcasting from nearby Stonehaven in the Townhall, Mearns FM aims to keep Bervie up to date with local and charity events, as well as playing music. Staffed completely by volunteers, Mearns FM is run as a not for profit organisation, broadcasting under a community radio licence, with a remit to provide local focus news events and programming. Jointly funded by local adverts and local and national grants, it has one of the largest listening areas of any community radio station owing to the Mearns' distributed population. The station was set up to try to bring these distant communities together.

== Sport ==
Within the community there is the Bervie Caley football club.

There used to be football teams in the 20th century called Bervie Rangers and Bervie Celtic. There was a women's football team as far back as the 1960s.

== Education ==
- Bervie Primary School Nursery, which is attached to Bervie Primary School.
- Bervie Primary School serves Bervie and the surrounding rural area.
- The feeder secondary school is Mackie Academy in Stonehaven.

== Religion ==
Bervie Church

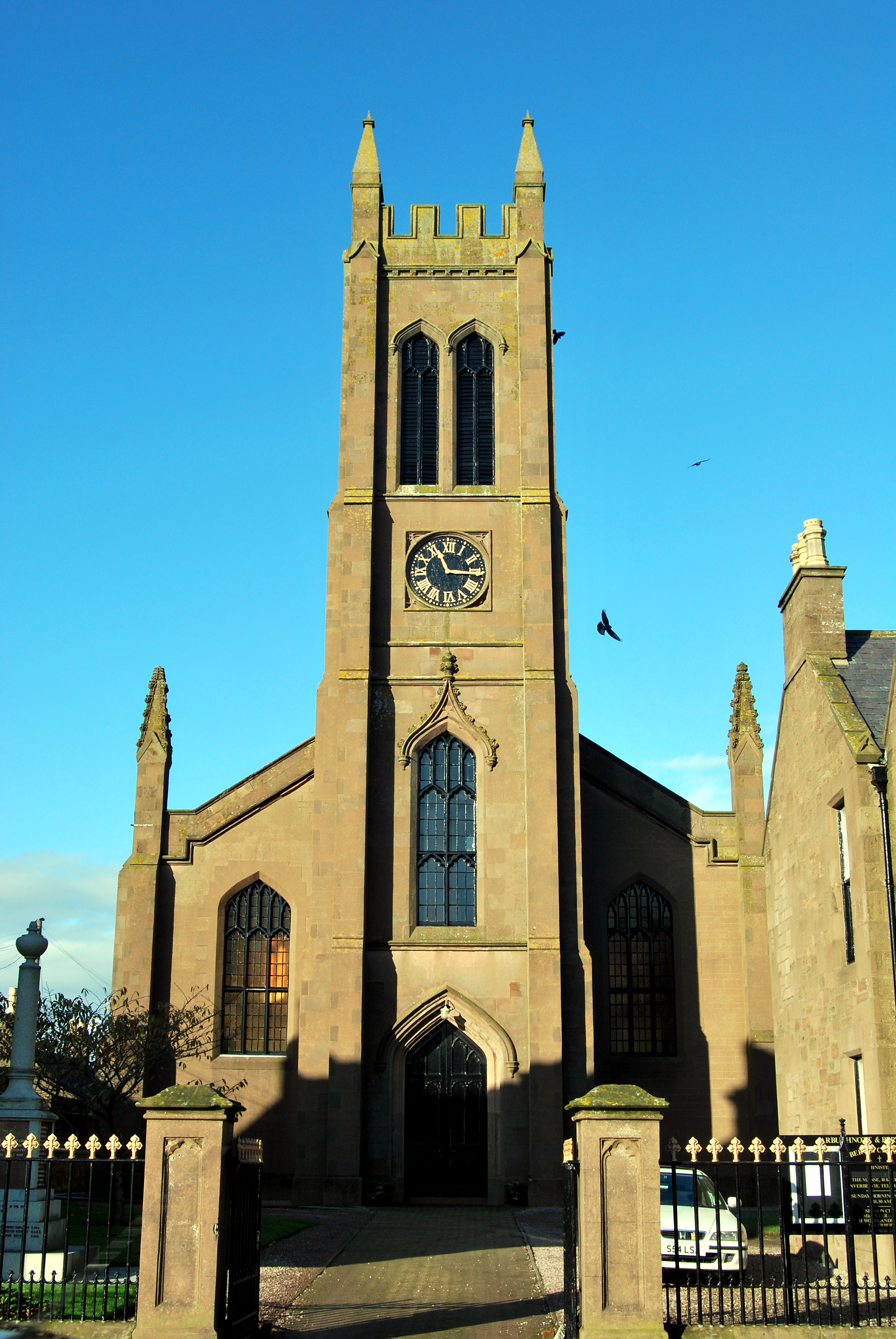
Bervie Church

Bervie Church is part of Arbuthnott, Bervie and Kinneff Church. It is on the main street in close proximity to the school. It was opened on 1 January 1837. The parish also owns the Church Centre (formerly the manse) next to the church, and formerly owned the Herd Centre (formerly YWCA Hall) at the bottom of Townhead. Within the parish grounds lies the War Memorial.

The original Bervie Parish Church is a ruin about 100m SE of the current building. It has the former Bervie graveyard around it, with Hercules Linton buried there. The last burials were in the 1920s. The new Bervie Graveyard is in Gourdon (which is in the parish of Bervie, and at the time, it was in open land - until Gourdon has grown over the 20th century).

The Living Rooms

The Living Rooms Christian Centre, founded in 2001, is at the far corner of Bervie Primary School car park, to the North West of Bervie Parish Church. The Living Rooms is an evangelical independent Baptist church, finding its roots in the former Brethern Church in Bervie which had existed since 1873. The building they use was the former stables of the parish manse. They formerly ran a Coffee Shop which was a popular centre of the community. Services of worship are held in the centre each Sunday evening as well as prayer meetings, three sessions of Mainly Music for parents and toddlers, and other special events.

St David's Episcopal Church

St David's Episcopal Church is in a linkage with the congregations in Brechin and Montrose, sharing a priest. Worship takes place at the small corrugated iron church, built by Mills & Shepherd in 1922.

in addition, the local Catholic Church uses the Episcopal Church premises for their services on a Saturday evening.

== Community groups ==
Bervie contains many prominent community groups:

Scouting and Guiding

Bervie has an active Scout group based in their church street hut. Scouts (10.5-14), Cubs (8–10.5), and Beavers (6–8) are all held. Bervie is part of the Kincardineshire Scout District.

There are Guides (10-14yrs) and Rainbows (5-7yrs) who also hold meetings in the Scout Hall. The Brownies (7-10yrs) hold meetings in the Burgh Hall. During 2023, the local Girlguiding Unit celebrated their centenary.

Gala and fireworks

Every year the Gala Committee organise the climax of the community diary in June. As part of this event, a 'citizen of the year' and 'young citizen of the year' prizes are awarded. The fireworks display is organised every year on the Sunday nearest to Bonfire Night.

== Transport ==
Inverbervie has regular bus links to Stonehaven, Montrose, Aberdeen and Perth via the X7 Coastrider route. It was served by Bervie railway station, the terminus of a branch line from Montrose, from 1865 to 1951, with freight services discontinued in 1966. In 1900, there were about 20 trains daily. The route hugged the coast, and terminated near the beach. The place where the old station was is now a carpark used for access to the beach and a tarmaced walkway following the former railway route. The nearest railway stations are located at Montrose, Laurencekirk or Stonehaven.

== Notable residents ==
- Hercules Linton (1837–1900), designer of the Cutty Sark clipper ship
- Donald M. Baillie (1887–1954), Bervie United Free Church Minister and Theologian
- Kieran Freeman (born 2000), Scottish footballer

== See also ==
- List of burghs in Scotland
- Aber and Inver as place-name elements
- Allardice Castle
- Arbuthnott, Bervie & Kinneff Parish Church
