= Drumtochty Forest =

Forest in Aberdeenshire, Scotland

Coordinates: 56.924955°N 2.503172°W

Drumtochty Forest is a coniferous woodland in Kincardineshire, Scotland. In earlier times this forest was associated with Drumtochty Castle. Other notable buildings in this part of the Mearns include Fasque House, Fetteresso Castle, and Muchalls Castle.

Ian Maclaren mentions Drumtochty Forest in his bestseller book of stories "Beside the Bonnie Brier Bush", a collection of tales of Rural Scotland, which shone light on the Scottish way of life.

Drumtochty forest comprises a distance of 1.5 miles which takes an estimated 1 hour to travel across it. It will be recommended for hikers to carry a map to navigate through the forest due to no way markings in the forest.

== See also ==
- Droop Hill
- Fetteresso Forest
