= Media in Aberdeen =

Media in Aberdeen have long been published or broadcast. The main newspaper of the city and the surrounding area, the Press and Journal, has been made and printed in the city since 1748, making it Scotland's oldest newspaper.

The city has a number of regional radio stations and has local production facilities for the BBC and ITV.

Aberdeen is famous for the entertainers of Scotland The What.

Student media at the University of Aberdeen are also very active: student newspaper The Gaudie, Aberdeen Student Radio and Granite City TV are all produced by students.

== Newspaper ==
The main newspapers of Aberdeen are the daily Press and Journal and the Evening Express, both printed six days a week by Aberdeen Journals, which also printed the Aberdeen Citizen until it ceased publication in 2018.

Student newspaper The Gaudie is produced fortnightly during term time at the University of Aberdeen. It is free and is distributed around the Kings College Campus and throughout the city.

== Television ==
For over 45 years, Aberdeen has been home to the ITV regional franchise for northern Scotland, Grampian Television, broadcast from a converted tram depot in the Queens Cross area. Since a takeover by the Scottish Media Group (now STV Group plc) in 1997, Grampian's identity and local programming output have gradually been depleted: now Grampian is officially known as STV North, and broadcasts from smaller studios in the Tullos area of the city. The local news programme STV News at Six is still produced from Aberdeen alongside regional commercials.

BBC Scotland also have a base in Aberdeen's Beechgrove area. BBC Aberdeen is most known for Tern TV's production of The Beechgrove Garden television and BBC radio programmes.

== Local radio ==
Aberdeen has three local commercial radio stations: Northsound 1 on 96.9, 97.6 & 103 FM, Greatest Hits Radio North East Scotland on DAB, and Original 106 on 106.8 & 106.3 FM. The Northsound 1 and Greatest Hits Radio North East Scotland stations operated as a single station, Northsound Radio, until 1995. BBC Radio Scotland broadcasts local news opt-out bulletins for Aberdeen and North East Scotland on weekdays.

Latest audience figures put Northsound 1 as the number one radio station in the area. Original 106 have increased their audience share to become the second most listened to local radio station, with 100% of programming output produced and presented in-house. Northsound 1 broadcasts locally-generated programming from their Aberdeen studios for 8 hours during weekdays: 4 hours in the morning and 4 in the afternoon. The rest of the output (16 hours per day) is shared programming from Glasgow and Manchester.

There was a community radio station called North East Community Radio FM (NECR FM), broadcasting from Kintore, Aberdeenshire whose signal reached some parts of Aberdeen city. It closed in 2018.

Station House Media Unit (based at Station House, a partially National Lottery-funded community project) runs a radio station broadcasting with a five-year community licence on 99.8 MHz FM, known as shmuFM. Before it acquired its FM licence, the station was available on the internet. shmuFM continues to provide access to their live broadcast via their website.

In the 1990s, the Aberdeen University Students' Association (then known as the Aberdeen University Students' Assembly, and acting through one of its constituent bodies, the Students' Representative Council) obtained a restricted service licence (RSL) for temporary FM radio broadcasts; its station was first known as Slick FM. This has now become the internet station Aberdeen Student Radio, which broadcasts every day during term time from the Kings College campus.

In addition, a multi-ethnic community organisation entitled Multi-ethnic Aberdeen Ltd. runs Multi-ethnic FM (Me FM) on an annual basis using an RSL and has said it hopes to apply for a permanent licence. At other times, internet broadcasts are employed.
