= Michael Forbes (farmer) =

Scottish farmer (born 1952)

- Born: c. 1952 (Age 72-73)
- Known for: refusal to sell his land to Donald Trump

Michael Forbes (born circa 1952) is a farmer, part-time salmon fisherman and quarry worker from near Balmedie in Aberdeenshire, Scotland, who became known in 2007 after his refusal to sell his family's land to Donald Trump for a golf course and resort.

== Biography ==
Forbes rose to fame for refusing to sell his 23 acres of Scottish farmland to Donald Trump, who was building the Trump International Golf Links with support from Alex Salmond, the Scottish First Minister. Forbes did not know of Donald Trump before they interacted and "took an instant dislike to him", saying he boasted about money and "was being nicey, nicey". He refused Trump's offer of a £450,000 plus an annual salary of £50,000 for an unspecified job. Though the golf complex plans were rejected in late November 2007 by Aberdeenshire Council, they were approved by the Scottish Government in November 2008.

Donald Trump publicly branded Forbes as a "village idiot" and repeatedly said that his farm was a "slum" that would spoil Trump's golf course with the mere sight of it. Forbes had a shed on his property that was painted "NO GOLF COURSE". He said that Trump can "take his money and shove it up his arse. I don't want his money."

The Trump Organization threatened to use a compulsory purchase order to forcibly remove Forbes and his neighbors from their land. Scottish people formed a Tripping Up Trump Campaign to make it more difficult to transfer the title to the land, and hundreds of people bought small interests in Forbes' property and became co-owners.

Much of Forbes' experience was filmed for the 2011 the BBC documentary You've Been Trumped, which follows various neighbours as Trump's project aggressively imposes on their property, shutting off their water and electricity service. Before its television debut, Trump's lawyers demanded the "defamatory" and "misleading" documentary not air, which was ignored.

== Awards ==
In 2012, Michael Forbes won "Top Scot" at the Glenfiddich Spirit of Scotland Awards following an open public vote, beating Andy Murray and he traveled to Edinburgh to accept the award in his full Highland dress with a standing ovation. This provoked Trump to retaliate against the event sponsor in a series of Tweets, pledging that "that no Trump property will ever do business with Glenfiddich or William Grant & Sons" (a whisky brand and its distillery owner), saying they "should be ashamed of themselves for granting this award to Forbes". The company responded that it had "no influence on this decision" which was a public ballot as always.

== In popular culture ==
Forbes and his struggle with Trump featured in the 2011 documentary film You've Been Trumped, directed by Anthony Baxter and produced by Richard Phinney. His portrait by Alicia Bruce with his wife, Sheila, is held in the National Galleries of Scotland collection. Forbes has been compared to the beachcomber character in the film Local Hero.

Forbes was also featured on the HBO news magazine, Real Sports with Bryant Gumbel.

== See also ==
- Holdout (real estate)
