= Rushall =

Rushall may refer to:

== Places ==
- Rushall, Herefordshire, England
- Rushall, Norfolk, England
- Rushall, West Midlands, England
  - Rushall railway station, West Midlands, England
- Rushall, Wiltshire, England
- Rushall railway station, Melbourne, Australia

== People ==
- Helen Rushall (1914–1984), Scottish treasurer
- Richard Rushall (1864–1953), English businessman
