= Scottish Championship (golf) =

Golf tournament in Scotland

Coordinates: 57.1638°N 2.0117°W

Nexo Championship
Tournament information
- Location: Balmedie, Aberdeenshire, Scotland
- Established: 2020
- Course: Trump International Golf Links Scotland (Old Course)
- Par: 72
- Length: 7,439 yards (6,802 m)
- Tour: European Tour
- Format: Stroke play
- Prize fund: US$3,000,000
- Month played: August

Tournament record score
- Aggregate: 265 Adrián Otaegui
- To par: −23 as above

Current champion
- (Scotland) Scott Jamieson

Location map
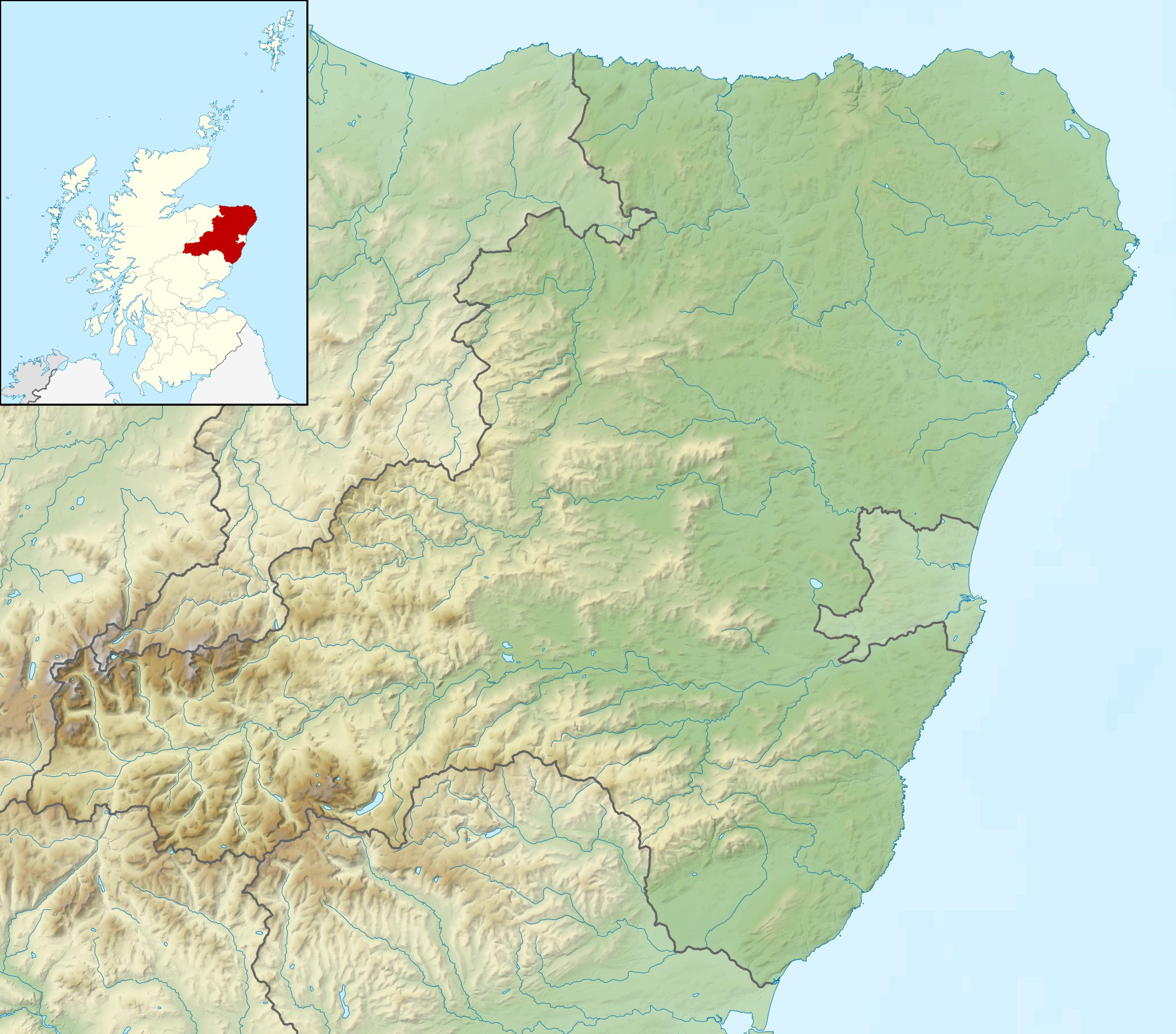
- Location in Scotland Location in Aberdeenshire

The Scottish Championship was a professional golf tournament that was initially held in October 2020 at Fairmont St Andrews, in Fife, Scotland. The tournament was played again in August 2025 at Trump International Golf Links Scotland.

== History ==
The tournament was intended to be a one-off event and was the final leg of a second four-week "UK swing" on the European Tour during the 2020 season. The principal sponsor was AXA Asia. Adrián Otaegui won by four shots over Matt Wallace to claim his third European Tour victory.

In May 2025, it was announced that the tournament would be revived for the 2025 season, taking place in August at Trump International Golf Links Scotland.

== Winners ==
Year	Winner	Score	To par	Margin of victory	Runner-up	Venue
Nexo Championship
2026	(Scotland) Scott Jamieson	277	−11	2 strokes	(England) Matthew Jordan	Trump International (Old)
2025	(Scotland) Grant Forrest	280	−8	4 strokes	(England) Joe Dean	Trump International (Old)
2021–2024: No tournament
Scottish Championship
2020	(Spain) Adrián Otaegui	265	−23	4 strokes	(England) Matt Wallace	Fairmont St Andrews (Torrance)
