= Caledonia's Ultimate Beach Event =

Beach ultimate competition in Scotland

CUBE (Caledonia's Ultimate Beach Event) is a beach ultimate competition held on the sands of Balmedie, just north of Aberdeen, United Kingdom. The competition was started in 2000 by the University of Aberdeen Ultimate Club ('Positive Mojo'), and has since grown into an international event. The tournament is open to any team although the majority of participating teams are from local (Scottish) universities.

Formally the Beach Ultimate Lovers Association (BULA) official British Ultimate Beach Championships, the tournament has been held every year since its inception with the exception of 2006. CUBE is the most northerly BULA affiliated tournament. The tournament is usually held in late April when the local weather conditions are beginning to improve.
