= Spiritus intus alit =

Spiritus intus alit may refer to:

- a Latin phrase meaning the spirit nourishes within, from Virgil's Aeneid (VI, 726)
- The motto of:
  - Clifton College
  - Inverurie Academy in Inverurie, Scotland
