= The Press and Journal =

Daily newspaper serving northern and highland Scotland

- Front page from 19 January 2012
- Type: Daily newspaper
- Format: Compact
- Owner: D. C. Thomson & Co. Ltd
- Publisher: Aberdeen Journals
- Editor: Richard Neville
- Founded: 29 December 1747; 278 years ago (Aberdeen's Journal); 1853; 173 years ago (Aberdeen Free Press); 1 December 1922; 103 years ago (Aberdeen Press and Journal)
- Headquarters: Aberdeen, Scotland, UK
- Circulation: 20,542 (as of 2024)
- Sister newspapers: Aberdeen Citizen; Evening Express; Scot-Ads
- ISSN: 2632-1165
- Website: pressandjournal.co.uk

The Press and Journal is a daily regional newspaper serving northern and Highland Scotland including the cities of Aberdeen and Inverness. Established in 1747, it is Scotland's oldest daily newspaper, and one of the longest-running newspapers in the world.

== History ==
The newspaper was first published as a weekly title, Aberdeen's Journal, on 29 December 1747. In 1748 it changed its name to the Aberdeen Journal. It was published on a weekly basis for 128 years until August 1876, when it became a daily newspaper.

The newspaper was owned by the Chalmers family throughout the nineteenth century, and edited by members of the family until 1849, when William Forsyth became editor. Its political position was Conservative.

In November 1922, the paper was renamed The Aberdeen Press and Journal when its parent firm joined forces with the Free Press, which had been published since 1853. The merged paper's first edition was published on 1 December 1922.

Historical copies of the Aberdeen Journal, dating back to 1798, are available to search and view in digitised form at The British Newspaper Archive.

Ethel Simpson, pioneering female journalist, was the first women junior reporter at The Press and Journal, and was also one of the first female chief reporters.

== Present-day situation ==
The newspaper is printed six days a week and there are six geographic editions every day (seven prior to June 2011). Although for many years a broadsheet, since 2012, The Press and Journal has been in compact size.

The newspaper is occasionally criticised for its regional perspective on global events, but the paper defends this stance, occasionally running "proud to be local" advertisements. Just one week after the September 11 attacks in 2001 the paper's World news section totalled just a single half-page.

The head office of the paper was located in Mastrick, Aberdeen, and is now in the city centre. As of March 2012 employed 470 staff locally and at branch offices throughout the North of Scotland. The current editor of the newspaper is Richard Neville, who replaced former editor Damian Bates in 2017.

The paper, along with the Evening Express and Scot-Ads, is published by Aberdeen Journals, who also published the Aberdeen Citizen. It has a circulation of 22,927 copies, making it the most-read and best-selling former broadsheet newspaper in Scotland. Its circulation is greater than that of The Herald and The Scotsman combined. Aberdeen Journals is now owned by the Dundee-based D. C. Thomson media group, after being sold by the Daily Mail and General Trust in 2006.

The Press and Journal, the Evening Express, Aberdeen Citizen and Scot-Ads were all printed on Aberdeen Journals' own printing presses in Aberdeen until May 2013. Since then, all titles are printed in Dundee. Until March 2006 the News of the World was also printed on the Aberdeen press.

== Coverage of Trump International Golf Links Development ==
The Press and Journal was a staunch supporter of the building of a highly controversial golf resort by Donald Trump at the Menie Estate in Balmedie, Aberdeenshire. The development was against the wishes of many local residents, and on an area designated as a Site of Special Scientific Interest.

In 2007, the Aberdeen Evening Express ran pictures of seven councillors who voted against the application under the headline "You Traitors". In 2009, the newspaper announced it would not report anything said by the protest group "Tripping Up Trump", saying it was not "bona fide". In contrast, opponents complained, the DC Thomson papers in Aberdeen, the Evening Express and the Press and Journal gave a large amount of positive press to Donald Trump and the real estate development.

In 2013, Press and Journal editor Damian Bates married Sarah Malone, then executive vice president and press spokeswoman for the Trump International project.

== Former journalists ==
- Bruce Taylor (1948–2024), the first reporter to reach the 1988 Piper Alpha disaster
- Caroline Phillips (1870–1956), honorary secretary of the Aberdeen branch of the Women's Social and Political Union
- Ethel Simpson (1926–2017), one of the publication's first female chief reporters
- Jack Webster (1931–2020), columnist
- William Forsyth (1818–1879), edited the paper from 1849 to 1878

== See also ==
- List of newspapers in Scotland

== Bibliography ==
- Reid, Harry (2006). Deadline: The Story of the Scottish Press. Edinburgh: Saint Andrew Press. ISBN 978-0-7152-0836-6.
