= 99.8 FM =

FM radio frequency

The following radio stations broadcast on FM frequency 99.8 MHz:

== United Kingdom ==
- Awaaz FM in Southampton
- Capital Manchester and Lancashire in Burnley
- KCC Live in Knowsley
- Nation Radio East Yorkshire in Hull
- shmuFM in Aberdeen
