= William Forsyth (writer) =

Scottish poet and journalist (1818–1879)

William Forsyth (1818–1879), was a Scottish poet and journalist.

== Life ==
Forsyth was son of Morris Forsyth and Jane Brands, and was born at Turriff, Aberdeenshire, 24 October 1818. He was educated at Fordyce Academy and the universities of Aberdeen and Edinburgh. For some years he studied medicine, becoming assistant to a country doctor, and twice acting as surgeon to a Greenland whaler, but he never took a medical degree, and ultimately abandoned medicine for literature. His first engagement was as sub-editor of the Inverness Courier (1842) under Robert Carruthers, whom he assisted in the preparation of Chambers's Cyclopædia of English Literature. In 1843 he became sub-editor of the Aberdeen Herald, then conducted by Mr. Adam, and he contributed in prose and verse for several years. In 1848 he joined the staff of the Aberdeen Journal, and eventually was appointed editor, a post which he held for about thirty years.

In Aberdeen, at Bonnymuir, Maryville, Friendville, Gordondale, and Richmondhill, his successive homes, he spent more than thirty years. During the last ten years of his life Forsyth suffered from cancer of the mouth. After a long illness, he died on 21 June 1879. He was buried in the cemetery of Allenvale on the Dee. Forsyth married in 1854 Miss Eliza Fyfe, who survived him.

== Activism ==
In Aberdeen, the establishment of the Association for Improving the Condition of the Poor was mainly due to him, and he not only sat on the managing committee, but was for six years secretary. He read a paper to the Social Science Congress in 1877, on 'The Province and Work of Voluntary Charitable Agencies in the Management of the Poor.' Forsyth was elected a member of the first Aberdeen school board, and served as convener of a committee for questions affecting the grammar school and town council. Forsyth twas chosen captain of the citizens' battery. This appointment he held for eighteen years, retiring with the rank of major. Some of his martial songs obtained a wide popularity. He also took much interest in everything connected with the service, and made suggestions to the war office as to practical gunnery and the use of armed railway carriages in warfare.

== Works ==
Forsyth's principal literary works were 'The Martyrdom of Kelavane' (1861)—based on the story of the 17th-century Georgian queen Ketevan—and 'Idylls and Lyrics' (1872). The latter volume contains 'The Old Kirk Bell,’ and several other pieces published for the first time, but it was mainly made up of reprints from magazines. The most finished of these is 'The River,’ which came out in the Cornhill Magazine in William Makepeace Thackeray's time. 'The Piobrach o' Kinreen,’ an old piper's lament for the clearance of Glentannar, first appeared in Punch

Forsyth was in politics a liberal-conservative. During the American Civil War he was almost alone among Scottish journalists in advocating the cause of the Union. In the controversy of Charles Kingsley v. John Henry Newman he wrote in support of the former, and received a letter of thanks from Kingsley. In church matters Charles Wordsworth, Bishop of St. Andrews and Alexander Ewing, bishop of Argyle, corresponded with him privately. Forsyth also wrote two pamphlets on Scottish church questions, entitled 'A Letter on Lay Patronage in the Church of Scotland' (1867) and 'The Day of Open Questions' (1868). In the first of these he indicated the lines on which reform of the church might be carried out, ahead of the Act for the Abolition of Church Patronage (1874).

After his death 'Selections' from his unpublished writings, with a 'Memoir,’ were edited by his friend Alexander Walker, Aberdeen. This volume reproduces 'The Midnicht Meetin',’ a satire on the promoters of the union of the Aberdeen and Marischal colleges, originally printed for private circulation.

== Selected publications ==
- The Life of Marcus Tullius Cicero. J. Murray. 1864.
- Novels and novelists of the eighteenth century. J. Murray. 1871.
- History of ancient manuscripts. John Murray. 1872.
- Essays critical and narrative. Longmans, Green. 1874.
