= You've Been Trumped =

- Film poster
- Directed by: Anthony Baxter
- Produced by: Richard Phinney
- Starring: Donald Trump; Michael Forbes
- Release dates: 3 May 2011 (Hot Docs Canadian International Documentary Festival); 21 October 2012 (United Kingdom)
- Running time: 95 minutes
- Country: United Kingdom
- Language: English
- Box office: £18,191

You've Been Trumped is a 2011 documentary by British filmmaker Anthony Baxter. The film documents the construction of a luxury golf course on a beach in Balmedie, Aberdeenshire, Scotland, by developer Donald Trump and the subsequent struggles between the locals, Donald Trump, and Scottish legal and governmental authorities.

== Production ==
You've Been Trumped is a documentary film directed by Anthony Baxter and is one hour and 19 minutes long.

== Synopsis ==
The film documents Donald Trump's efforts to build a US$1.5 billion golf-course and resort on a beach that has been declared a site of scientific interest on the East Coast of Scotland. It follows legal battles between Aberdeenshire Council, Trump's lawyers, and the involvement of the Scottish Government. The documentary captures the anger of local residents, including local farmer Michael Forbes, and the arrest of the film maker.

== Critical reception ==
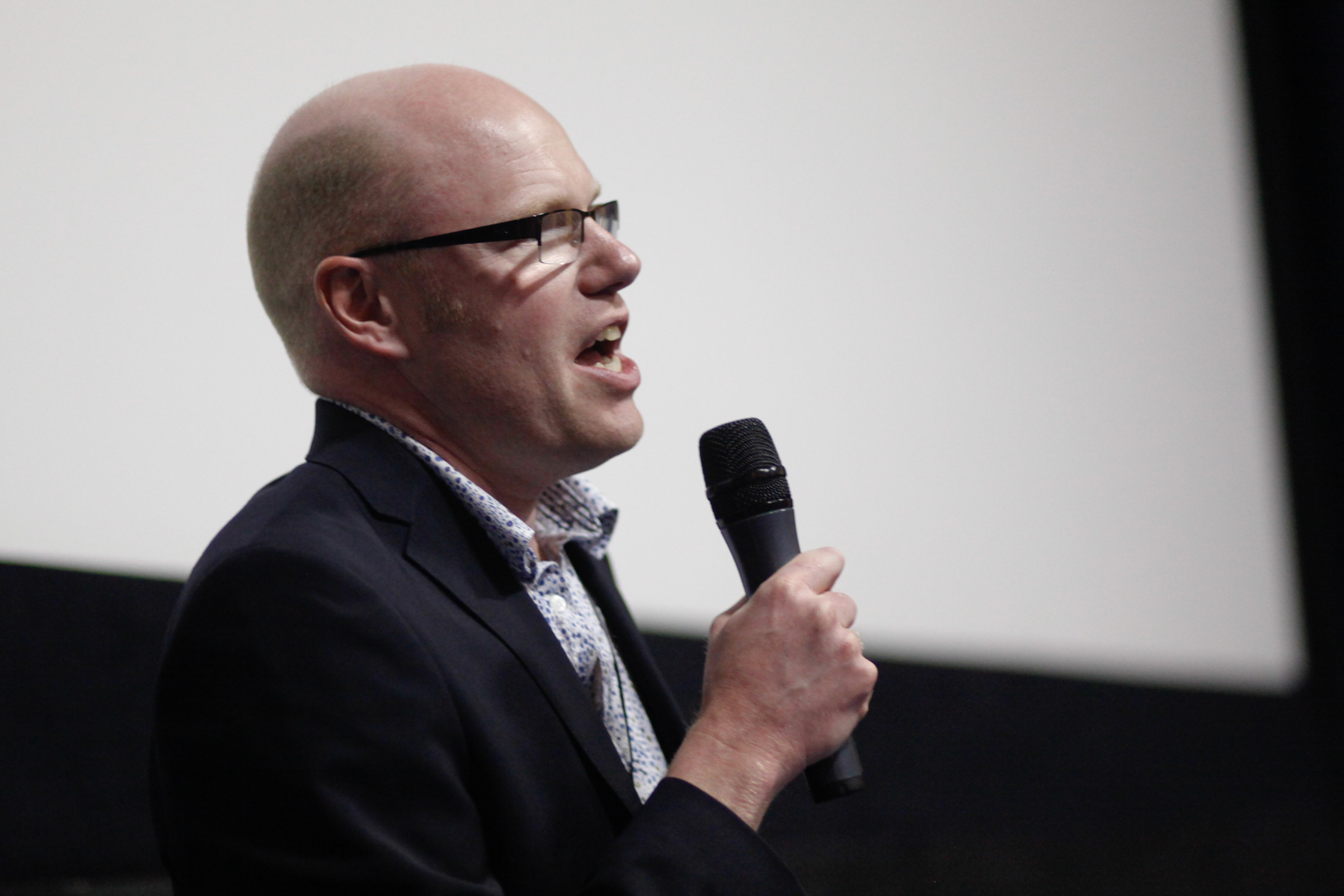
Director Anthony Baxter during a Q&A at the 2012 Miami International Film Festival premiere of the film

ReelScotland reviewed the film, concluding "an emotive film which shows both what can happen when a Government considers money over its own laws and how those at the sharp end remain resilient throughout". Roger Ebert of the Chicago Sun-Times gave the film three stars out of four, writing that the most fascinating aspect of the documentary is "Trump's almost joyous rudeness" and that "the underlying message is that if you are rich and powerful enough, you can run roughshod over tradition and private property rights and buy your place at the table." Stephen Holden wrote in the New York Times that the documentary is an "unabashedly hostile portrait" of Trump, depicting him as "an insensitive, lying bully" who tried to pressure the golf course's neighbours into sell their properties to him, including threatening them with compulsory purchase orders.

Bill Forsyth, the director of Local Hero (from which the film used footage), reacted to the film positively. Forsyth saw the film at the Shetland Film Festival.

The documentary and its director won several awards:

- The Sheffield Green Award at the Sheffield International Documentary Festival, Sheffield, England, in 2011
- The Audience Award at the Dakino – Bucharest International Film Festival, Romania, in 2011
- The Maysles Brothers Award for Best Documentary Film at the Denver Film Festival, Denver, Colorado, US, in 2011
- The Victor Rabinowitz and Joanne Grant Award for Social Justice at the Hamptons International Film Festival, East Hampton, NY, US, in 2011
- The Directors' Choice Award for Best Environmental Film at the Sedona International Film Festival, Sedona, Arizona, US, in 2012

== Legal response ==
When it was announced that the documentary was to be given its British television premiere on BBC Two on 21 October 2012, Trump's lawyers contacted the corporation to demand that the film should not be shown, claiming that it is "defamatory" and "misleading". The screening went ahead. The BBC defended its decision, noting that Trump had repeatedly refused to be interviewed in conjunction with the film.

== Sequels ==
=== A Dangerous Game (2014) ===
A follow-up documentary called A Dangerous Game was released in September 2014. The film continues the story of the locals' struggle against Donald Trump but goes further afield also. It documents Trump's plans to build a luxury golf course in Dubrovnik, Croatia, on Mount Srđ overlooking Dubrovnik, against which local residents campaign. The residents win a referendum on the matter but this is ignored by officials.

=== You've Been Trumped Too (2016) ===
In October 2016, Baxter announced the release of You've Been Trumped Too, a sequel to the film timed for release before the 2016 United States presidential election. The film focussed on the problems experienced by neighbours of the Trump International Golf Links, including a 92-year-old woman who claimed that she was forced to collect water from a nearby stream in a bucket after construction workers had cut off her supply. In response to the film, lawyers representing Trump International threatened legal action against anybody who screened the film.
