= Mearns FM =

Radio station in Aberdeenshire, Scotland

Coordinates: 56.9640°N 2.2077°W

- Stonehaven; Scotland
- Broadcast area: Aberdeenshire
- Frequencies: FM: 105.1 MHz, 105.7 MHz, 106.2 MHz, 107.3 MHz; DAB+: 9C
- RDS: MEARNSFM

Programming
- Format: Community Radio Station

Ownership
- Owner: Mearns Community Radio Ltd

History
- First air date: 6 June 2009

Links
- Webcast: radioplayer.mearnsfm.org.uk
- Website: www.mearnsfm.org.uk

Mearns FM is a community run radio station based in Kincardineshire, also known as the Mearns. There are transmitters in Laurencekirk, Inverbervie, Stonehaven and Portlethen leading to a coverage area stretching from St Cyrus to Aberdeen. The studio is located in Stonehaven.

== History ==
In 1993, Community Radio in the Mearns area began following a visit to North East Community Radio by members of the Stonehaven Community Centre Management Committee. Stonehaven Community Radio was subsequently formed, and it transmitted for the first time during July 1994 from the old primary school toilet block in Stonehaven Community Centre. At that time, community stations could only operate for 28 days at a time. The group disbanded in 1998.

In 2004, five year community radio licences were introduced, which led to the formation of a new group of enthusiasts. A draft constitution was adopted at the first AGM which was held in the late Summer of 2005. The project was delayed because a round of broadcasting applications had just closed and Ofcom, the regulating authority, did not invite new applications until the late autumn of 2006. It was necessary for the organisation to become a Company Limited by Guarantee and a registered charity.

The committee originally planned the station to be named Stonehaven Community Radio but it was decided to become Mearns wide and be called Mearns FM. Because of the large geographical area of the Mearns, the station applied for three transmitters which Ofcom subsequently agreed to and a licence was issued in early July 2007.

The station began broadcasting on 6 June 2009 during the annual Feein' Market in Stonehaven. At 11 am, the station was officially opened by the local MP, Sir Robert Smith.

Since then OFCOM have renewed our license to broadcast twice and we are able to keep broadcasting until at least 2024.

In 2016, the station was the only Community Radio Station in Scotland to receive accreditation from the BBC for Eurovision Song Contest coverage.

In April 2020 Mearns FM was successful in a bid to increase power at all 3 transmitters and install a new transmitter at Portlethen church hall. This would improve coverage across South Aberdeenshire, half the funding needed to replace 4 transmitters was granted from Aberdeenshire Council. Mearns FM also launched on DAB digital radio across North-East Scotland in July 2020. It stopped broadcasting over DAB on 30 April 2022 before re-establishing itself on DAB+ on SHMU's Aberdeen small-scale multiplex on 1 July 2025.

== Studio ==
The station was broadcast from Stonehaven Town Hall from its inception in 2007 until late 2019, when it had to move due to electrical upgrades taking place in the town hall. After broadcasting from temporary studios, the station moved permanently to a new studio on Ann Street on 13 September 2020.

== Programming ==
Programmes did include the self-proclaimed "world's only Doric show". Every Sunday at 9 am, the previous Sunday's worship service of Bervie Church is broadcast.

== See also ==
- Community radio in the United Kingdom
- shmuFM
- NECR
