= Evening Express (Scotland) =

Scottish newspaper

- Front Page from 14 January 2012
- Type: Daily newspaper
- Format: Tabloid
- Owner(s): D. C. Thomson & Co. Ltd.
- Publisher: Aberdeen Journals
- Editor: Craig Walker
- Founded: 20 January 1879
- Headquarters: Aberdeen, Scotland, UK
- Circulation: 9,449 (as of 2023)
- Sister newspapers: Aberdeen Citizen; Scot-Ads; The Press and Journal
- Website: eveningexpress.co.uk

The Evening Express is a daily local newspaper serving the city of Aberdeen, Scotland.

== History ==
Its first issue was published on 20 January 1879. It was a tabloid during the 1930s to the 1950s until it resumed as a broadsheet in November 1958, six days a week. By September 1989, The Saturday edition returned to a tabloid with the broadsheet formula during the weekdays. It became a tabloid six days a week in February 1995.

There was also a Saturday night paper called the Green Final which ended in June 2002 after many years in which it was printed on green paper instead of the usual white. It showed progress on how Aberdeen FC did in their matches as well as a full check on the day's football results. For many years, the Green Final was a broadsheet until it became a tabloid from 1988 till the end. The name occasionally reappears when the paper features junior football reports.

To celebrate its 40,000th edition, the Evening Express held a competition for one of its readers to win 40,000 one penny pieces – totaling £400.

In November 2021, the Evening Express website was merged with the existing Press and Journal website.

== Publication and circulation ==
The paper along with the Press and Journal is published by Aberdeen Journals Ltd. It has a circulation of 10,117.

== Columnists ==
Moreen Simpson, Scott Begbie the entertainments editor, former Grampian TV presenter Frank Gilfeather. In the Weekend section, every Saturday, TV critic Ewan Cameron gives his rundown on the week's programmes.

Evening Express Sports Editor Charlie Allan, Former Aberdeen F.C. footballers Stewart McKimmie and Joe Harper have columns in the sport pages. Another former Don Willie Miller has recently joined them. Sports reporter Sean Wallace also has a weekly column.

== Coverage of Trump International Golf Links controversy ==
The paper was a staunch supporter of the building of a highly controversial golf resort by Donald Trump at the Menie Estate in Balmedie, Aberdeenshire. The development was against the wishes of many local residents, and on an area designated as a Site of Special Scientific Interest. In 2007, the Evening Express ran pictures of seven councillors who voted against the application under the headline "You Traitors". 2009, the newspaper announced it would not report anything said by the protest group "Tripping Up Trump", saying it was not "bona fide". In contrast, opponents complained, the DC Thomson papers in Aberdeen, the Evening Express and the Press and Journal gave a large amount of positive press to Donald Trump and the real estate development. In 2013, Press and Journal editor Damian Bates, who was formerly editor at the Evening Express, married the executive vice president and press spokeswoman for the Trump International project.

== Fallout with Aberdeen Football Club players ==
As of 29 February 2008 the players of Aberdeen Football Club stated that they would no longer give interviews to the Evening Express. The players cited perceived negative reporting on the part of the paper as their reason for the move. Sports Editor Charlie Allan proposed a meeting with Scott Severin, but this was declined by the captain. Allan instead met with club media officer Dave Macdermid, who gave a short interview to the Evening Express.

Aberdeen FC manager Jimmy Calderwood did not observe the silence of his players, saying that he felt the players had made a mistake in ceasing to communicate with the Evening Express. He did however state, as did Macdermid, that the players had taken particular offence to the paper's speculation that a number of them would be leaving the club in the summer. Calderwood said that the Evening Express had been "naughty" to do so.

In early March the ban on giving interviews to the Evening Express was lifted, and the players resumed normal communications with the paper.

== See also ==
- List of newspapers in Scotland
