= Callum Smith (skier) =

British cross-country skier (born 1992)

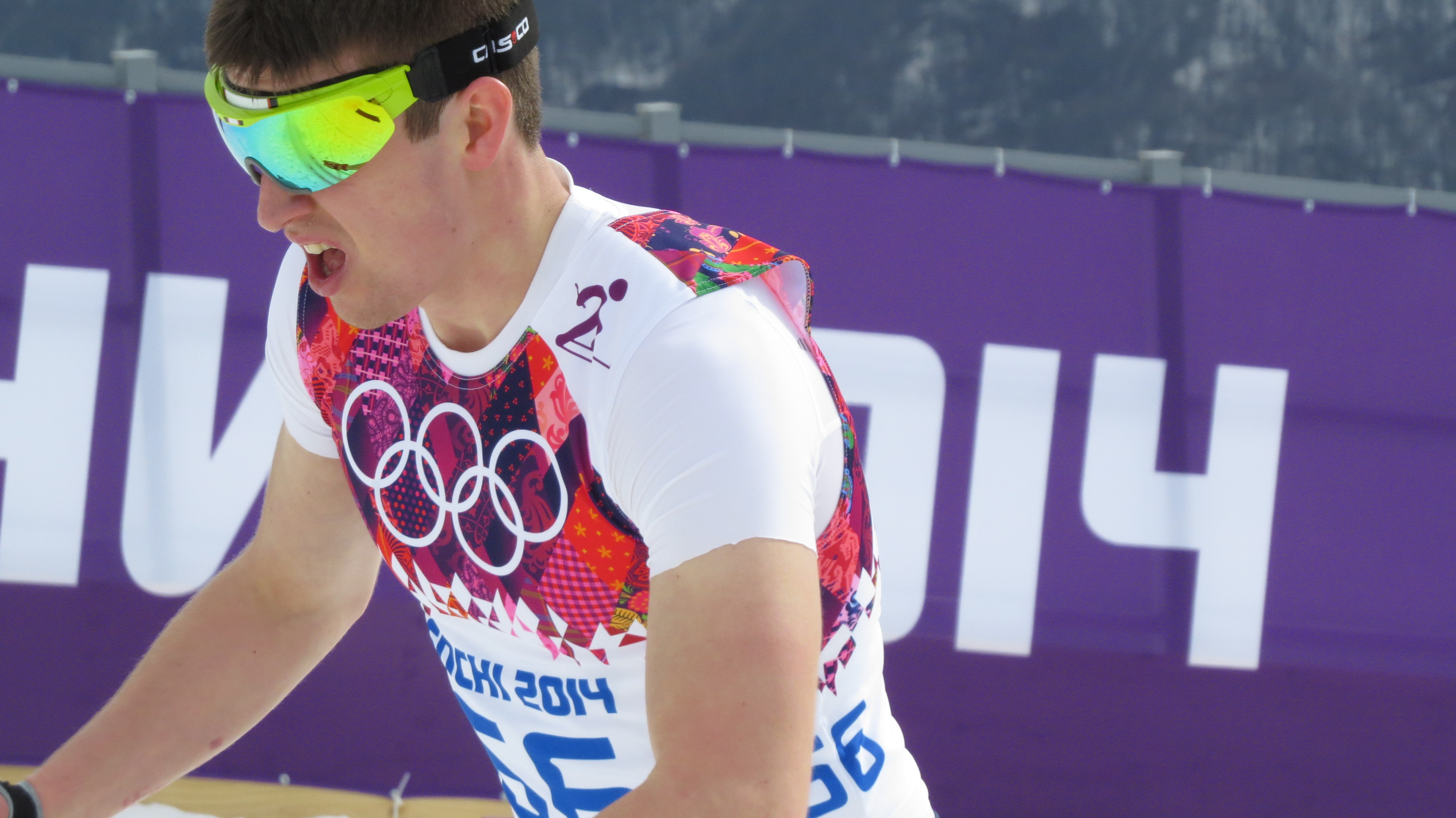
Smith at the 2014 Winter Olympics

Callum Smith (born 12 October 1992) is a British cross-country skier. He took up skiing at the age of eight and made his debut competing for Great Britain in 2008 in a FIS race in Tornio, Finland. He made his debut at the Winter Olympics in 2014, finishing 62nd in the 30km skiathlon, 62nd in the sprint and 67th in the 15km classical. He was educated at Inverurie Academy, before studying chemical engineering at the University of Edinburgh, and later medicine at the University of Bergen. Callum also competed at the Pyeongchang 2018 winter Olympics, finishing 54th in the Skiathlon and 50th in the 50 km classic events.

He retired from professional cross-country skiing in 2018 and now works as a doctor in Bergen, Norway.
