= A Dangerous Game (2014 film) =

2014 documentary film

A Dangerous Game is a 2014 documentary film and a follow-up to You've Been Trumped. The film was released in September 2014, and continues the story of the locals' struggle against Donald Trump but goes further afield also. It features a story in Dubrovnik, Croatia where a development has been approved to build a luxury golf course on Mount Srđ overlooking Dubrovnik but local residents are campaigning against it and held a referendum which they won but which officials ignored. The film also looks at luxury golf resorts in general, how they damage the natural environment because of high water and pesticide usage, and how they often only serve the super rich whilst bypassing local democracy to please the developers.

== Release ==
A Dangerous Game premiered at Hotdocs Film Festival in Canada and subsequently screened at Sheffield International Documentary Film Festival, Edinburgh International Film Festival, Denver Starz, Hamptons International Film Festival, Vancouver International Film Festival, Reykjavik International Film Festival and Bergen International Film Festival.

== Reception ==
Mark Kermode of The Observer gave the film three stars out of five and wrote, "If this follow-up lacks the personal focus of the original, it makes up for it in terms of global context".
