= Anthony Baxter (filmmaker) =

English documentary filmmaker and journalist

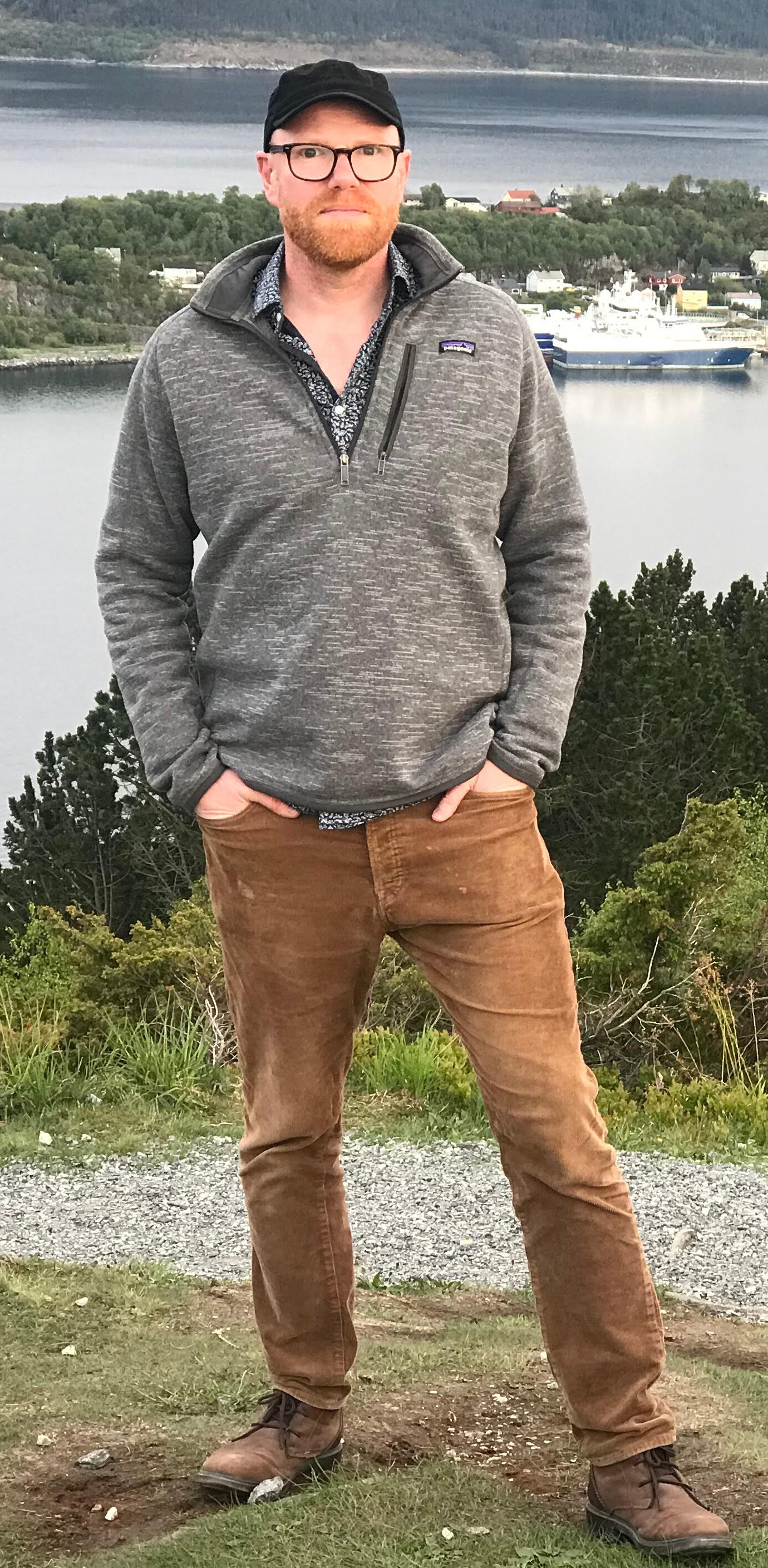
- Born: Nottingham, England
- Occupation(s): Filmmaker, journalist

Anthony William James Baxter is a British documentary director and producer. He is known for his documentary films Eye of the Storm, Flint: Who Can You Trust?, You've Been Trumped and A Dangerous Game.

== Career ==
Baxter started his career as a journalist at Capital Radio in 1989. He later worked as a Producer at BBC Radio 5 Live, the BBC factual television programme Top Gear, and at Independent Television News (ITN). In 2011, he directed his debut feature documentary, You've Been Trumped, which won best environmental film award at the Sedona Film Festival, won the Maysles Brothers Award at the Denver Film Festival and won the Sheffield Green Award at Sheffield DocFest. In 2014, he directed A Dangerous Game, which was nominated for the audience award at the Edinburgh International Film Festival and the Sheffield Green Award at Sheffield DocFest. He directed the sequel to You've Been Trumped, entitled You've Been Trumped Too, released in 2016.

Baxter's 2021 documentary Eye of the Storm, premiered at the Glasgow Film Festival, prior to its broadcast on BBC Two and won the best specialist factual at BAFTA Scotland.

== Filmography ==
Year	Title	Contribution	Note
2021	News of the Dead	Director, editor, cinematographer and producer	Short film
2021	Eye of the Storm	Director, writer, editor and producer	Documentary
2020	Flint: Who Can You Trust?	Director, editor and producer	Documentary
2016	You've Been Trumped Too	Director, editor and cinematographer	Documentary
2015	Dark Side of the Greens	Director, editor and cinematographer	Documentary
2014	A Dangerous Game	Director, editor and cinematographer	Documentary
2011	You've Been Trumped	Director, writer, editor and cinematographer	Documentary

== Awards and nominations ==
Year	Result	Award	Category	Work	Ref.
2021	Won	BAFTA Scotland	Best Specialist Factual	Eye of the Storm	
2021	Nominated	Glasgow Film Festival	Official Competition	Eye of the Storm	
2014	Nominated	Edinburgh International Film Festival	Audience Award	A Dangerous Game	
2014	Nominated	Sheffield DocFest	Sheffield Green Award	A Dangerous Game	
2012	Won	Sedona Film Festival	Best Environmental Film	You've Been Trumped	
2012	Nominated	Palm Springs International Film Festival	John Schlesinger Award	You've Been Trumped	
2012	Nominated	Miami International Film Festival	Knight Documentary Competition	You've Been Trumped	
2011	Won	Denver Film Festival	Maysles Brothers Award	You've Been Trumped	
2011	Won	Hamptons International Film Festival	Victor Rabinowitz and Joanne Grant Award	You've Been Trumped	
2011	Won	Sheffield DocFest	Sheffield Green Award	You've Been Trumped	
