= Ethel Simpson =

Scottish journalist

- Photo of Ethel Simpson
- Born: 2 September 1926
- Died: 12 December 2017 (aged 91)
- Known for: being a pioneering woman journalist

Ethel Simpson (2 September 1926 – 12 December 2017) was a Scottish journalist. She worked to break down gendered barriers within journalism and was one of the first female chief reporters at the Aberdeen Press and Journal.

== Early life ==
Ethel was born in Banff on 2 September 1926 to a farming family. She attended Keithhall Primary School and then Inverurie Academy. After completing a shorthand typing course at Webster's College, she joined the Aberdeen Press and Journal in 1944 at age seventeen.

== Career ==
Ethel then became a junior reporter for the Aberdeen Press and Journal in 1945, the first woman to do so. In 1955 and 1956, Ethel spent three months on a 10,000 tour of North Africa, writing about her travels. She worked her way up, eventually becoming the chief reporter of the journal in 1975. Ethel pressed for gender equality in the newsroom, and protested when a female reporter was told to go home and change into a skirt. She retired in 1986.

== Personal life ==
Ethel had a daughter, Emma, and two grandsons. She was a monarchist and a Conservative.

== See also ==
- Mamie Magnusson
- Isabella 'Marie' Imandt
