= Trump International Golf Links Scotland =

Golf course in Aberdeenshire, Scotland

Trump International Golf Links

- Location in Scotland
- 57°16′38″N 02°01′17″W

Club information
- Location: Ellon, Aberdeenshire, Scotland
- Established: 2012, 14 years ago
- Type: Private
- Owner: The Trump Organization
- Website: trumpgolfscotland.com

Course
- Designed by: Martin Hawtree
- Par: 71
- Length: 7,300 yards (6,700 m)
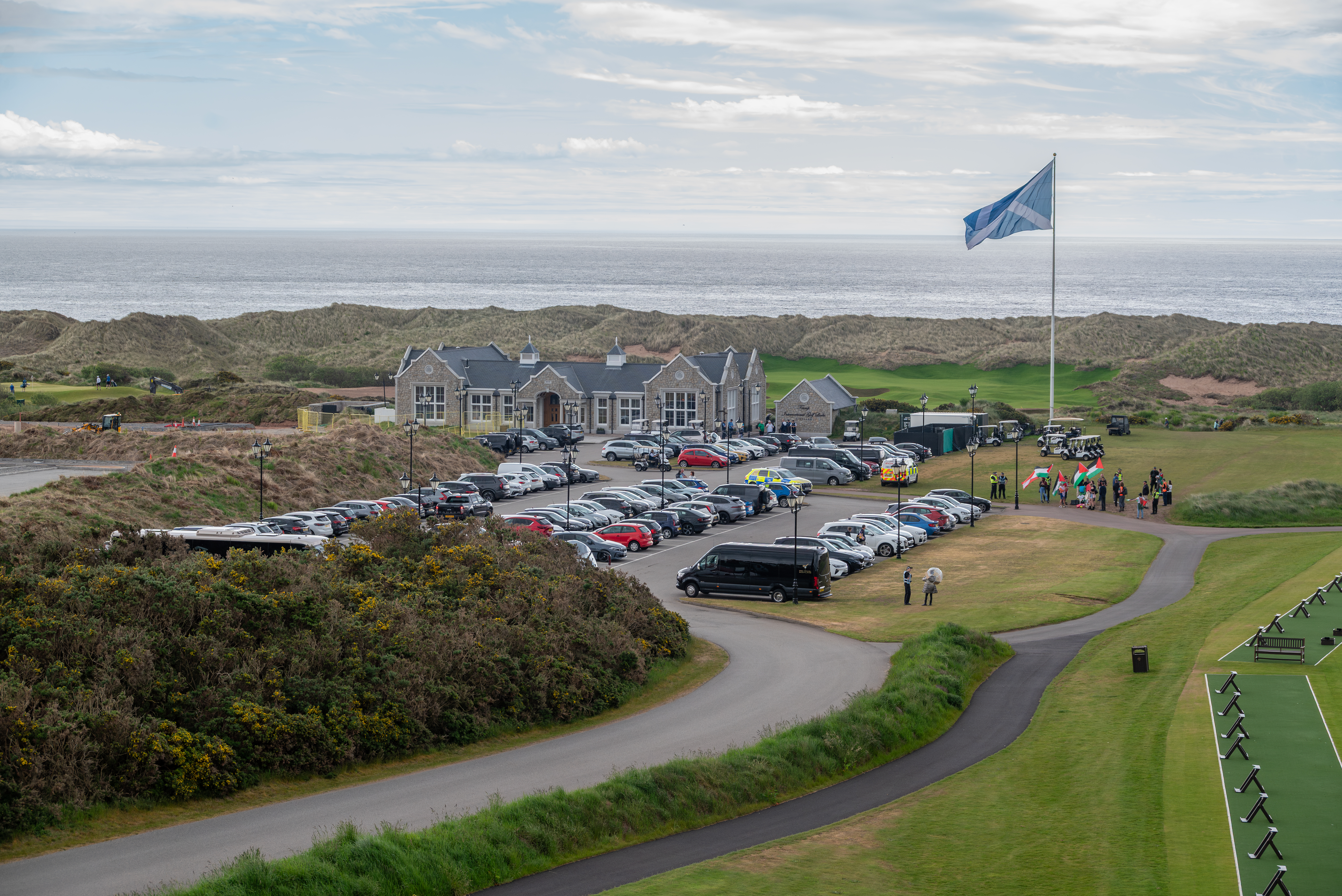
- Trump International Golf Links

Trump International Golf Links, Scotland (TIGLS) is a golf course in Balmedie, Aberdeenshire, Scotland, owned by Donald Trump. It opened in 2012.

== History ==
In 2006, Trump purchased a 1,400-acre (570-hectare) plot just north of Aberdeen at Menie (Balmedie), Scotland, with the promise of turning it into a £1 billion golf resort and "the world's best golf course" capable of hosting world class events such as The Open Championship. Despite opposition from many people both locally and in other parts of Scotland and the UK, and negative reaction from a number of environmental groups, the project continued.

The development plan for Trump International Golf Links, Scotland (TIGLS) included two 18-hole courses, a 5-star hotel, golf villas, holiday homes, and a golf academy. It was strongly supported by local business leaders, but met opposition from local residents, campaigners and environmental groups anxious to preserve the 4,000-year-old sand dunes that were designated an SSSI (Site of Special Scientific Interest). In June 2019, Scottish Natural Heritage ruled that the golf course had "partially destroyed" the sand dune system, causing permanent habitat loss, and recommended that the SSSI status be revoked. The SSSI special status was removed in December 2020.

Though the development was recommended for approval by Aberdeenshire Council officials, the development was initially rejected by a local subcommittee of elected members; however, it was subsequently approved following a controversial planning inquiry ordered by the Scottish Government in June 2008, at which Trump personally testified. Work began on the site in July 2010.

In March 2009, the Trump Organization had asked the Council to use its powers of compulsory purchase to acquire some areas of land at Balmedie not forming part of the original TIGLS site for which planning permission already existed. These included four family-owned properties. In response local campaigners established Tripping Up Trump, a movement aimed at protecting the families at Menie being threatened with eviction. When it emerged at the end of January 2011 that Queen guitarist Brian May had agreed to the use of the band's song "Bohemian Rhapsody" in a film highlighting the plight of the families, Trump appeared to deny in a media statement that there had ever been an eviction threat, declaring "we have no interest in compulsory purchase and have never applied for it."

In September 2011, the Trump Organization lodged a formal objection to the proposed construction of a wind farm off the Aberdeenshire coast not far from the site of the new hotel and luxury housing. Donald Trump also wrote personally to the First Minister of Scotland protesting mainly on aesthetic grounds at the proposed erection of offshore wind turbines, which he characterised as 'ugly'. His letter claimed that he was protesting on behalf of the Scottish people, 'not... merely for the benefit of Trump International Golf Links.' The Organization's subsequent lawsuit failed as did the appeal.

In 2011, a documentary directed by Anthony Baxter called You've Been Trumped was released, showing the situation of local residents adversely affected by the resort's construction. It contains footage of, among others, economists who query the benefits claimed for the local economy, environmentalists critical of the damage allegedly caused by the development and golfers who voice doubts about claims made for the resort by the Trump Organization. It also shows Anthony Baxter being arrested by a Grampian Police officer, while filming; he was later released without charge. Baxter has been quoted as saying that Trump branded the film 'boring' and Baxter himself 'a fraud'. The film has won several awards including the Hamptons Film Festival Social Justice Award, the Maysles Brothers Award for best documentary at the Denver Film Festival and the Sedona International Film Festival Director's Choice Award.

The course opened on 10 July 2012.

Despite Trump's threat to withdraw any further investment in Scotland amid the wind turbine controversy, he later purchased the prestigious Turnberry resort in Ayrshire in April 2014.

Aberdeenshire Council granted planning approval for a second golf course on the Menie site, to be named the MacLeod Course after Donald Trump's mother, Mary Anne MacLeod, in October 2020.

In May 2025, it was announced that the DP World Tour would stage the Scottish Championship at Trump International Golf Links, Scotland from 7–10 August 2025. This will mark the venue's debut as a host of a top-tier professional event on the European circuit. The tournament is expected to feature a $2.75 million purse and will serve as the penultimate event of the tour's Closing Swing. DP World Tour CEO Guy Kinnings described the course as "one of the UK's top modern links courses", while Eric Trump stated that the venue is "ready to host elite-level championship golf".

== Operation ==
By 31 December 2018, the accounts reveal an overall expenditure on assets to date of £33,659,179. During the year there had been an operating loss of £866,991 and loss before tax of £1,077,504. This loss represented a small improvement on the previous year (2017), when it made a loss of around £1,250,000. The number of employees had reduced from 84 during 2017 to 77 in 2018. The shareholders' deficit increased by just over £1,000,000 to £11,725,897.

For 31 December 2019, the accounts reveal an overall asset value of £32,071,221. During the year there had been an operating loss of £896,367 and loss before tax of £1,105,763. This loss represented a further decline on the previous year (2018). The number of employees rose back up to 84 during 2019 from 77 in 2018. The shareholders' deficit again increased by over £1M to £12,783,441.

In February 2023, the company managing the golf course, Trump International Golf Club Scotland Ltd, reported pre-tax losses of £697,000 ($860,000) in 2021.

For 31 December 2023, the accounts revealed an overall asset value of £37,201,613. During the year there had been an operating loss of £1,159,571 and loss before tax of £1,427,216. This loss represented a further decline on the previous years. The number of employees was 84 during 2023. The shareholders' deficit again increased to £16,625,087. There was a loan due to Mr D J Trump of £40,616,321 (unchanged) with a further loan from DJT Holdings LLC of £11,780,663.

As at 31 December 2024, the accounts reveal an overall asset value of £43,971,361. During the year there had been an operating loss of £658,900 and loss before tax of £937,693. This loss represented continued the annual loss-making trend. The number of employees was 108 during 2024. The shareholders' deficit again increased to £17,273,972. There remains a loan due to Mr D J Trump of £40,616,321 (unchanged) with a further loan from DJT Holdings LLC of £19,000,855.

== Coat of arms ==
The coat of arms granted to "The Trump International Golf Club Scotland Ltd" in 2012 bears the battle cry: "Nunquam Concedere".

In 2008, Trump promoted the golf course with a coat of arms that he had used for his American businesses, but was warned by the Lord Lyon King of Arms, the highest authority for Scottish heraldry, that a Scottish law disallows the use of unregistered arms. In January 2012, shortly after the inauguration of the golf course, Trump unveiled a new coat of arms that had been granted to "The Trump International Golf Club Scotland Ltd" by the Lord Lyon in 2011.

The same coat of arms was later used for the Trump International Golf Links and Hotel Ireland.

== See also ==
- Donald Trump and golf
