= Helen Rushall =

Scottish schoolteacher and feminist

Helen M. B. Rushall MBE
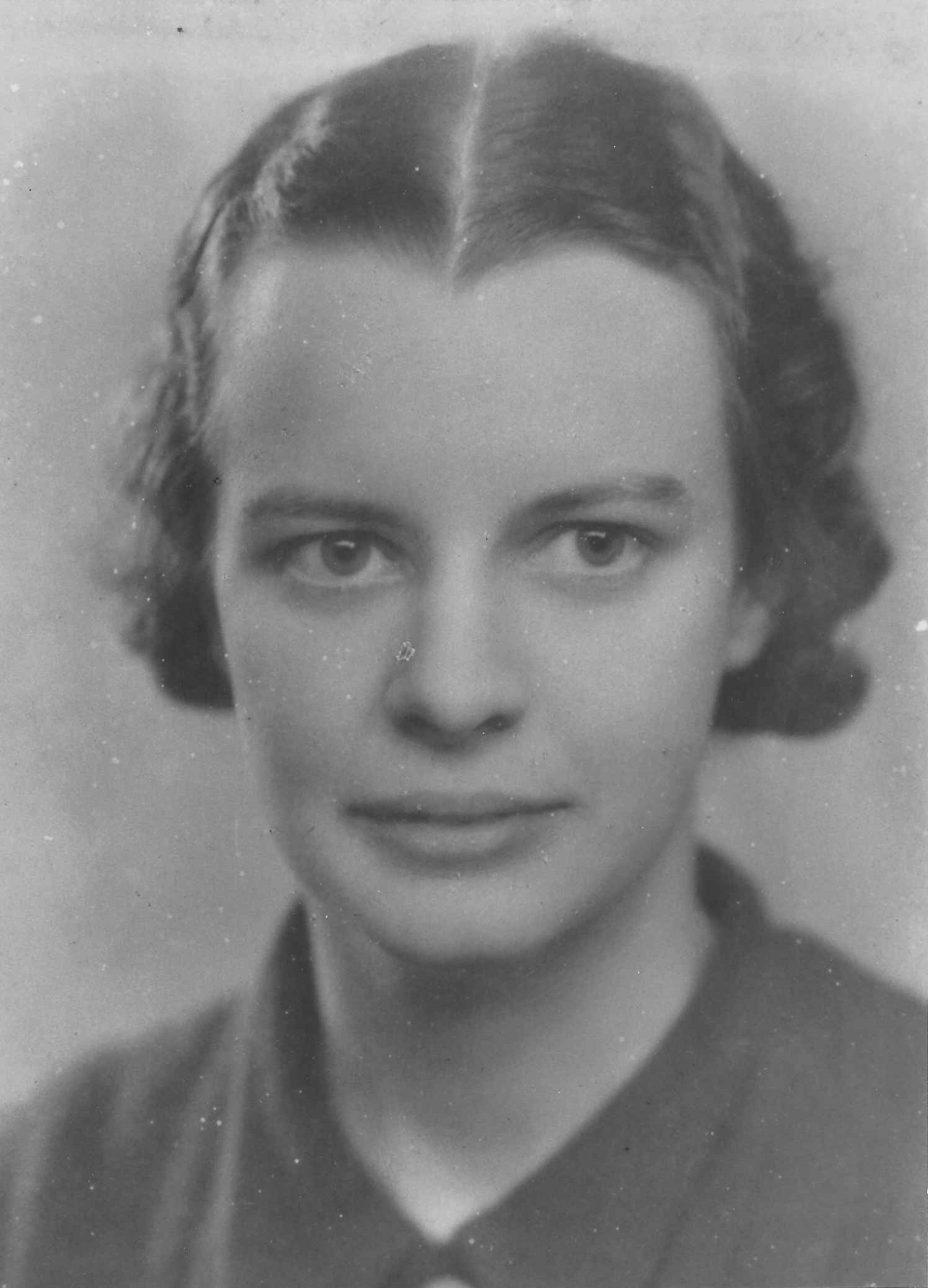
- Rushall in November 1938
- Born: Helen Mary Cruickshank; 22 April 1914; Logie Newton Farm, Ythanwells, Aberdeenshire
- Died: 15 October 1984 (aged 70); Friars Cliff, Christchurch, Dorset
- Education: Inverurie Academy; Aberdeen High School for Girls
- Spouse: Richard Rushall (m. 1945)
- Children: 2
- Relatives: Richard Rushall (father-in-law)

Helen Mary Boswell Rushall MBE (née Helen Mary Cruickshank, 22 April 1914 – 15 October 1984) was a British schoolteacher who helped to form the National Council of Women in Burma, an affiliate of the International Council of Women. In 1958 she was made a Member of the Order of the British Empire (MBE) in recognition of her work on the council and her rehabilitation work after World War II.

== Life and career ==
Helen Mary Cruickshank was born on 22 April 1914 at Logie Newton Farm near Ythanwells, Aberdeenshire to John Walker Cruickshank (1882–1969) and Janet Isabella Cruickshank (née Caldow; 1883–1932). She was baptised on 13 June 1914, and was the eldest of four children; her younger siblings were Jean Caldow (1916–2001), James Robert (1918–1942) and Ian Armstrong (1919–2014). Cruickshank attended the Inverurie Academy and Aberdeen High School for Girls as a weekly boarder, staying in lodgings local to the school from Monday to Friday, before returning to Logie Newton at weekends and during the holidays. She trained as a domestic science teacher at the Aberdeen School of Domestic Science (also known as the "Do-School"), then got a teaching job in Chesterfield, Derbyshire.

While teaching in Chesterfield, Cruickshank met Kenneth Nicholson (1901–1999), an assistant manager at Chesterfield Grammar School, and his wife, Charlotte Mary "Molly" Nicholson (née Rushall; 1907–1963), at the town's Caledonian society. In 1938, the couple introduced Cruickshank to Molly's younger brother, Richard Boswell Rushall (1911–2002), who was on leave from Rushall & Co.—a formerly dissolved firm of stevedores, ship chandlers and provision suppliers in Rangoon, Burma, which had been restarted in 1907 by Molly and Richard's father—at which he had worked since 1935. Cruickshank and Richard became engaged in December that year, which they celebrated both at the Nicholsons' Chesterfield home and at Logie Newton. On 31 December, Richard left for Rangoon to work as director of Rushall & Co., with the intention of returning soon to marry Cruickshank. However, following the British declaration of war on Germany in September 1939, the Burmese government restricted further home leave, making it impossible for Richard to return to the UK.

With her fiancé in Rangoon, Cruickshank continued to teach domestic science in Chesterfield, but returned to Logie Newton for the 1939 summer holidays, meaning that she was able to bid farewell to her younger brother Ian—a private in the 9th Battalion of the Gordon Highlanders—as he was called up. She resigned from teaching in 1940 so that she could work as part of the Women's Land Army (the Land Girls) on Logie Newton, where she learnt to drive the tractor and lorries. On 28 February 1942, her brother James was appointed to the rank of pilot officer and was placed on probation. After he was called up, he flew with No. 239 Squadron of the Royal Air Force Volunteer Reserve, and died during the Dieppe Raid when his Mustang Mk IA crashed in Brachy, Normandy on 19 August.

Following Victory over Japan Day in August 1945, Richard sent a telegram to Cruickshank to let her know that he would soon be returning to the UK and that she should begin to plan their wedding. Richard flew back from India on a military plane, and, on 13 September 1945, the couple were married at St. James' Episcopal Church in Aberdeen by George Bartlet, the dean of the Diocese of Aberdeen and Orkney, with a reception afterwards at the Caledonian Hotel. Later that year, Richard returned to India to be demobilised, before continuing to Rangoon, where Helen Rushall met him. The Rushalls remained in Rangoon for the next ten years. While in Burma, Rushall took an active role in furthering Burma–British relations by helping to form the National Council of Women in Burma, an affiliate of the International Council of Women. She also worked in rehabilitation, helping to build clinics for the Burmese people. During this time, the Rushalls had two children, a son and a daughter.

Burma became independent from the UK on 4 January 1948, and, by the mid-fifties, had begun expelling the non-Burmese population, who were told that they had to leave the country by a certain date. Consequently, in 1955 the Rushall family returned to the UK. They lived in Aberdeen for two years, before moving to Friars Cliff in Christchurch, Dorset. In December 1957, the foreign secretary, Selwyn Lloyd, submitted Rushall's name to Queen Elizabeth II for her appointment as an MBE. Following Lloyd's recommendation, the Queen directed that Rushall be appointed an MBE as part of the 1958 New Year Honours in recognition of her work on the executive committee of the National Council of Women in Burma, as well as her rehabilitation work after World War II. Rushall attended an investiture—the fifth in a series of six—at Buckingham Palace on 11 March that year, where the Queen presented her and 176 other men and women with the insignia of their awards. Rushall died on 15 October 1984 in Christchurch, at the age of 70. Her funeral was held on 19 October at All Saints Church in Mudeford.
