= Richard Rushall =

British businessman and mayor of Rangoon

Richard B. Rushall MBE
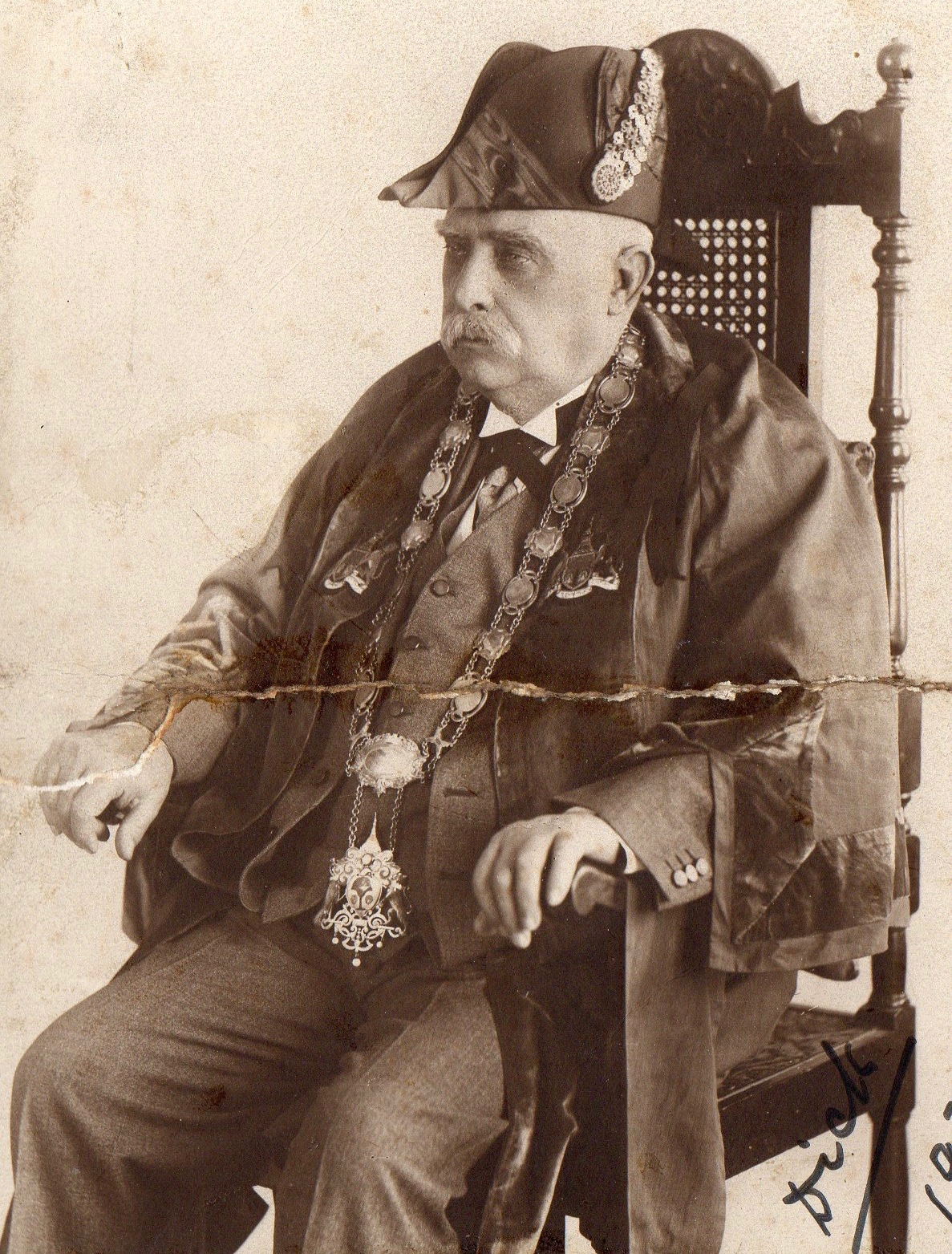
- Rushall in September 1930

9th President of the Rangoon Municipal Corporation
- In office 7 January 1930 – 31 December 1930
- Preceded by: M. M. Rafi
- Succeeded by: Thein Maung

Personal details
- Born: 6 March 1865 Braunston, Northamptonshire
- Died: 3 February 1953 (aged 87) Rangoon, Burma
- Spouses: Jane Graham (m. 1892; died 1899) Charlotte Trype (m. 1902; died 1933)
- Children: 8
- Relatives: Helen Rushall (daughter-in-law)
- Occupation: Ship's captain, businessman, mayor

Captain Richard Boswell Rushall MBE (6 March 1865 – 3 February 1953) was a British sea captain and businessman who served as mayor of Rangoon, Burma in 1930. Officially the president of Rangoon's municipal corporation, he was the ninth person to hold this office. Born in Braunston, Northamptonshire, Rushall was the eldest of eight children. After finishing school he left for sea, joined the UK's Merchant Navy, and became a ship's captain. He spent 20 years with the Irrawaddy Flotilla Company, of which 17 were in command of steamships belonging to the company. He settled in Rangoon with his family, resigned from the Irrawaddy Flotilla Company and restarted a dissolved stevedoring and contracting business. By 1909, the company—renamed to Rushall & Co.—had given work to a total of between 3,000 and 4,000 men.

In December 1922 Rushall was elected as an honorary magistrate, and was subsequently made a Member of the Order of the British Empire (MBE) for his distinguished service during the First World War. He was elected as mayor of Rangoon in January 1930, in an election that was described by Singapore's The Straits Times as having given "universal satisfaction". During his time as mayor, he aimed to improve the accommodation and quality of care in the city hospital, then, once his tenure was over, he sought to ensure that a fair share of stevedoring jobs in Rangoon were allotted to native dock labourers. During the Second World War Rushall evacuated to Bombay; he died at the age of 87 in Rangoon, where he was commended by Kyaw Tha for his work and character as mayor.

== Early life and naval career ==
Richard Boswell Rushall was born on 6 March 1865 in Braunston, Northamptonshire, to Benjamin Rushall (1825–1900) and Mary Rushall (née Boswell; 1843–1918). The Rushalls were a family of saddlers, and, at the time of Rushall's birth, their saddle- and harness-making business was owned by his father Benjamin, to whom the business had been transferred from his own father, also named Richard Rushall (1787–1880), in 1855.

Rushall was baptised in Braunston on 6 June 1865 and was the eldest of eight children. His younger siblings were William (1866–1953), Hannah (1868–1939), Benjamin (1870–1953), Frank Herbert (1874–1938), Daniel (1875–1947), Harriett (1876–1906) and Edgar Philip (1878–1879). After finishing school, Rushall left for sea and joined the Merchant Navy; he served as third officer on one of the British-India Steam Navigation Company's coasting steamers.

Rushall first began to reside permanently in Rangoon at the age of 20. He served an apprenticeship to Sandbach, Tinne & Co. that terminated in 1886, then joined the Irrawaddy Flotilla Company later that year. He stayed with the company for 20 years, of which 17 were spent in command of their steamships. Despite failing three times in the subject of Navigation in 1887, he eventually earned his certificate of competency as second mate from the Lords of Trade on 8 March 1888, and subsequently rose to the rank of ship's captain – he was aboard one of the final ships to travel under sail around Cape Horn. He married his first wife, Jane Amelia Graham (1872–1899), on 10 September 1892 in Burma, at the age of 27. He and Jane had two children together: Nancy (1897–unknown) and Benjamin Thomas (1898–1980). Jane died on 19 June 1899.

== Business ==
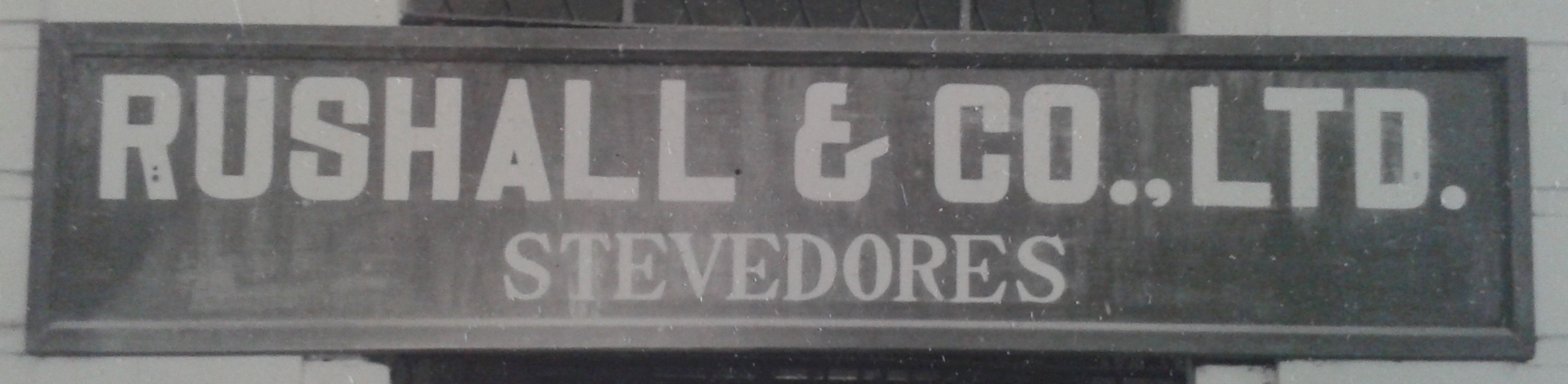
Sign for Rushall & Co., Ltd.

While in Rangoon, Rushall met Charlotte Sarah Trype (1882–1933), the daughter of the local station manager. The couple married on 27 July 1902 at the Presbyternian Church in Rangoon, in a service officiated by Rev. Alexander Forbes Adam Moir M.A. Four years later, Rushall resigned from the Irrawaddy Flotilla Company and, that same year, began business as a stevedore. The following April, he restarted a stevedoring and contracting business that had been established in 1864 but then subsequently dissolved. The company—renamed to Rushall & Co.—was located at 121 Judah Ezekiel Street (now Thein Phyu Road) next to the docks of the city, and, by 1909, had given work to a total of between 3,000 and 4,000 men.

Having settled in Rangoon, the Rushalls had four daughters: Cecelia (1903–unknown), Ella Irene (1905–1910), Charlotte Mary (1907–1963), and Edna Helen (1909–1910). Ella and Edna both died in 1910, causing Rushall and Charlotte to decide that it was not safe to bring up their family in Burma. Consequently, in 1911, Charlotte left Rangoon with the family for Rugby, Warwickshire, where, soon after, she gave birth to the couple's first son, Richard Boswell (1911–2002).

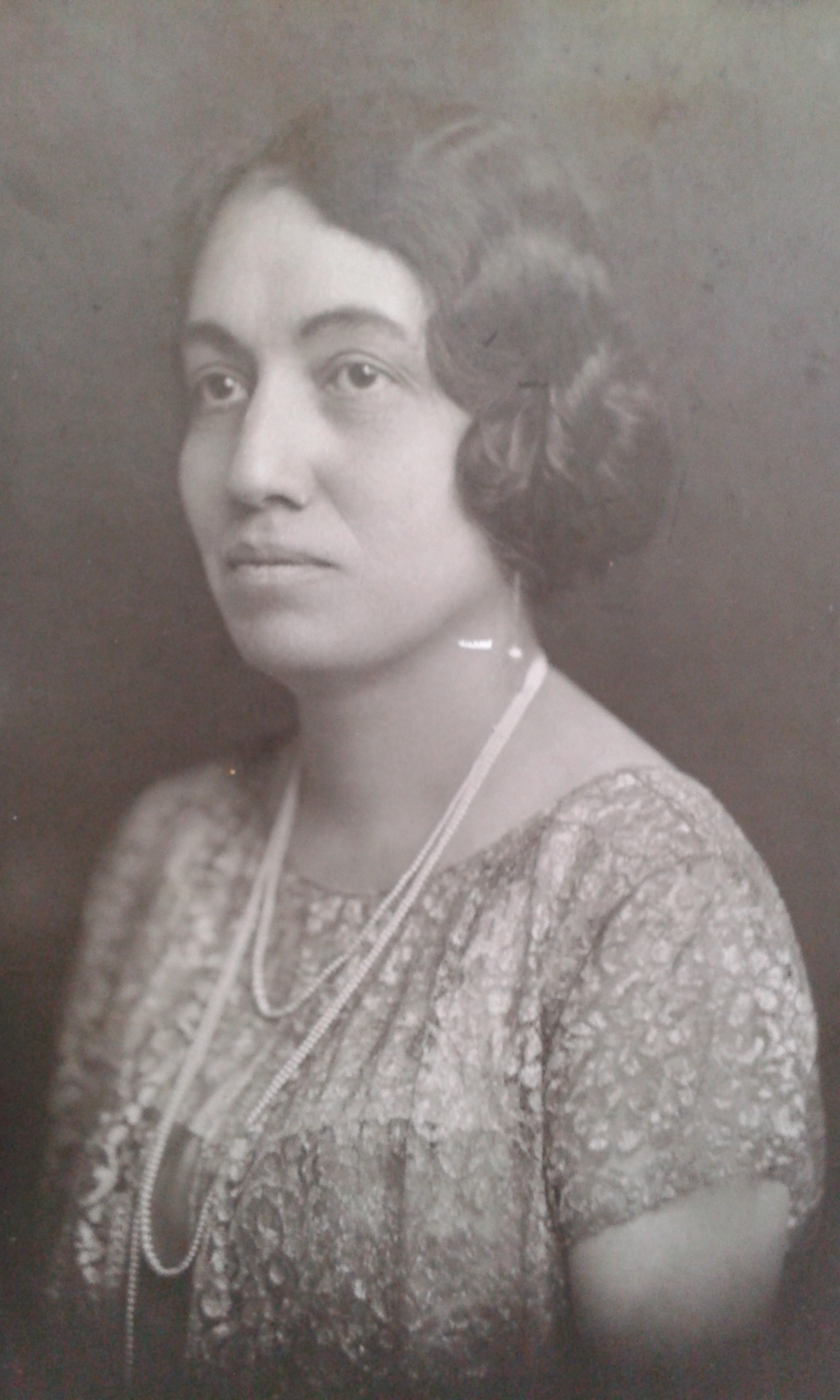
Rushall's second wife, Charlotte (left), and her gravestone at St Marie's Church, Rugby (right)

While in Rugby, Charlotte set up and managed the Rugby Motor Transport Co., a haulage contracting business dealing in lorries and charabancs. While she and her husband were its joint proprietors, Charlotte managed the company alone as its permanent director and chairman, as Rushall had remained in Rangoon to tend to his own business. Charlotte returned to Rangoon just once more; her and Rushall's second son, Edgar Boswell (1916–2002), was born soon after. Charlotte died in the Northfield Nursing Home in Rugby on 30 April 1933 following a long illness, and was buried at St Marie's Church. The Rugby Motor Transport Co. was wound-up two months after her death.

== Politics ==
During the First World War, Rushall worked as harbourmaster at Rangoon's harbour, although on 10 May 1921 he was initiated as a freemason into the Lodge of Rectitude in Rugby. In December 1922 he was elected as an honorary magistrate in the Rangoon Municipal Elections, whereupon he devoted himself to the improvement of the city's war memorial and public parks, particularly Dalhousie Park. He worked for eight years as a councillor of the municipal corporation of Rangoon, and was subsequently made an MBE for his distinguished service during the war. He served as chairman of the Roads and Buildings Committee, and also sat on the committees for public health and markets, playgrounds, and the protection of waifs and strays.

As a result of his public service in Rangoon, Rushall became known to Thibaw Min, the last king of Burma's Konbaung dynasty, and in 1925 he attended the funeral of Supayalat, the king's favourite wife. From 1928 he was vice president of the hospital and governor of Rangoon University. Other public offices that he held included governor of the gaol and board member of the Reformatory School in Insein. As a member of the board, Rushall provided picnics and river trips as an incentive to good behaviour for the school's more than 100 inmates.

== Mayor of Rangoon ==
In 1930, Rushall became the ninth person to serve as mayor of Rangoon (officially the president of the municipal corporation of Rangoon), when he was elected to the role on 6 January. His tenure began the following day, and lasted until the end of the year. Rushall was seen as a popular choice for the position – at the time, Singapore's paper The Straits Times described his election as having given "universal satisfaction". According to the Rugby Advertiser, Rushall was "extremely popular both among the European and the native population of the city", and was "well known for his numerous acts of kindliness and charity".

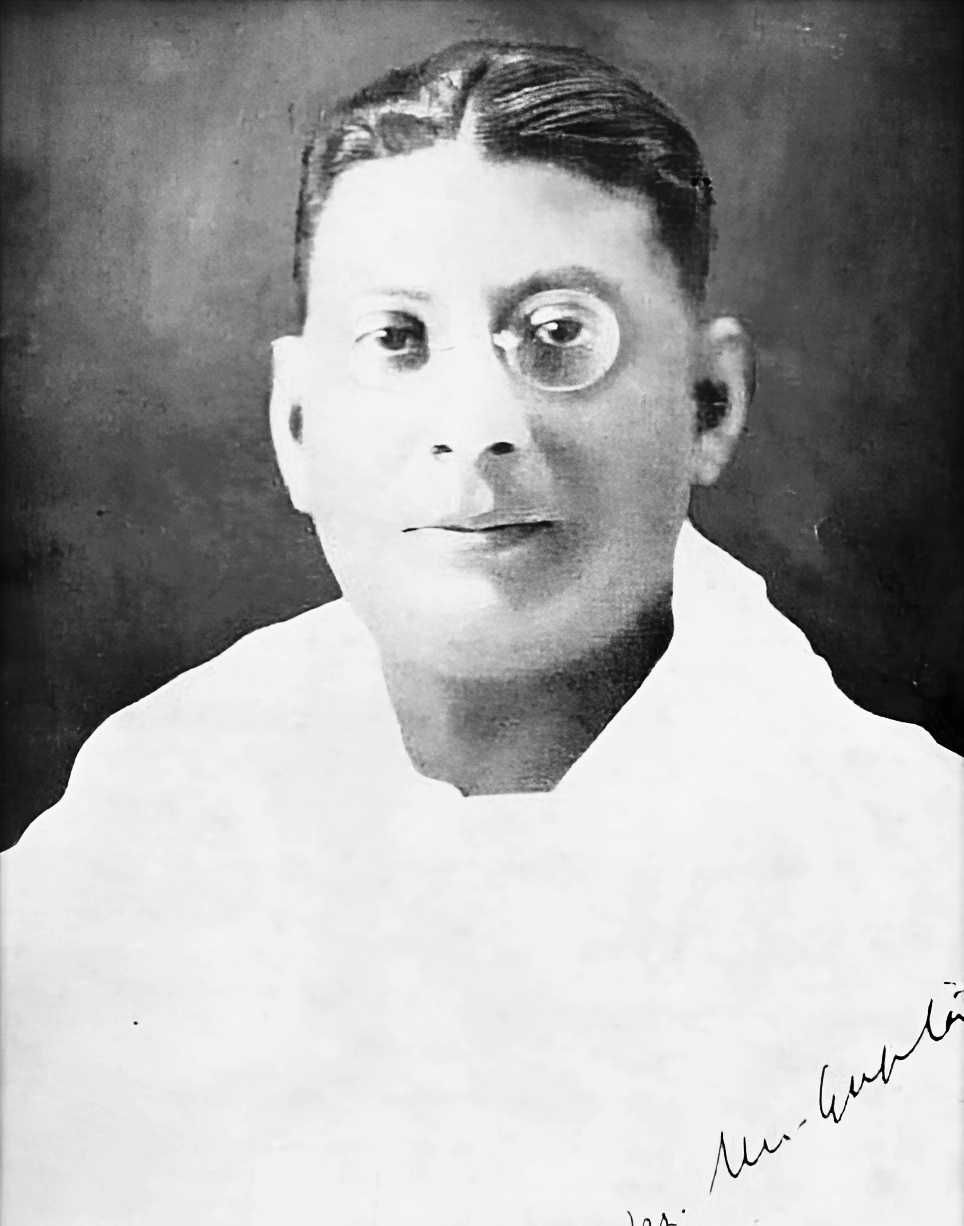
Rushall was called to give evidence at the trial of Jatindra Mohan Sengupta (pictured) in March 1930.

Rushall's year as mayor proved to be challenging. In March he was called by the district magistrate Maurice Collis to provide evidence at the trial of Jatindra Mohan Sengupta, the mayor of Calcutta, who was accused of sedition in speeches he had made during a visit to Rangoon. During the trial, a riot erupted outside the courthouse. Sengupta was subsequently acquitted. On 5 May, Burma was struck by an earthquake of magnitude M_{w} 7.4, which killed 58 people in Rangoon and injured a further 204. Later that month, further riots—this time of anti-Burmese Indian sentiment—sprung up in Rangoon and across the rest of the country following a strike by Indian coolies. One such riot lasted throughout the night of 26 May, and resulted in the deaths of 120 Indians and more than 900 injuries. Then, on 24 June, a group of inmates at the Rangoon Central Jail took charge of some of the warders' and sentries' rifles and tried to stage a break-out. The military police opened fire, causing another riot, during which 28 prisoners and several military police and jail sentries were killed.

In November 1930, Rushall supported a resolution to improve the accommodation and quality of care in the city hospital. As mayor, he also hosted a banquet for which he commissioned the Burmese painter Ba Nyan to make individual paintings for each of the 80 guests' menu cards. Ba Nyan submitted gouaches of street signs and sailing ships. Rushall would also pay visits to the schools in Kalaw, a hill town to the north of Rangoon.

== Later life and death ==
Once his tenure as mayor had ended, Rushall sat on a committee from 6 April 1931 that ensured that a fair share of stevedoring jobs in Rangoon were allotted to native dock labourers. That same year, he was a member of the Burma Research Society. On 5 February 1938, Rushall was appointed an honorary magistrate in Rangoon.

Following the Japanese invasion of Burma in early 1942, Rushall evacuated from the country with his daughter Nancy. He stayed out the Second World War in Bombay, but eventually returned to Rangoon, where he died on 3 February 1953, at the age of 87. Upon his death, Kyaw Tha—chairman of the Commissioners of the Port of Rangoon—commended him as a "born gentleman", and praised his work at the city's hospital and his "kindliness and infectious friendliness".
