= Aberdeen Journals =

Scottish newspaper publisher

Aberdeen Journals Ltd
- Type: Private
- Industry: Publishing and printing of newspapers
- Founded: September 1928
- Headquarters: Aberdeen, Scotland, UK
- Products: Aberdeen Citizen; Evening Express; Scot-Ads; The Press and Journal

Aberdeen Journals Ltd. is a newspaper publisher based in Aberdeen, Scotland.

The company publishes The Press and Journal, the Evening Express, the Aberdeen Citizen and Scot-Ads newspapers. It was owned by Northcliffe Newspapers Group, which is owned by Daily Mail & General Trust from 1995 until 2006, when Aberdeen Journals was sold to Dundee based D. C. Thomson & Co. Ltd.

The Press and Journal was first published as a weekly title on 29 December 1747 and was known as The Aberdeen's Journal.

It was published on a weekly basis for 128 years until August 1876, when it became a daily newspaper. In November 1922, the paper was renamed The Aberdeen Press & Journal when its parent firm joined forces with the Free Press. The Press & Journal, often called the P&J, is a daily morning regional newspaper. It is printed six days a week as a compact. The Press & Journal produces six geographic editions.

Daily readership – 138,000 Weekly readership – 287,000 Circulation – 67,781 (July–December 2011, 99.1% paid)

The current editor of The Press and Journal is Frank O'Donnell.

The Evening Express is a daily local evening newspaper which was first published on 20 January 1879. The current editor of the Evening Express is Craig Walker.
