= Aberdeen Citizen =

Former newspaper serving Aberdeen (1989–2018)

The Aberdeen Citizen was a weekly free newspaper in Aberdeen. Launched on 26 August 1989 as the Aberdeen Herald & Post, it succeeded the Aberdeen Post and was re-launched as its most recent title in 2002. It was the highest distributed free newspaper in Aberdeen. It provided a round-up of the week's community news, sport and events to over 75,000 households in the city and surrounding areas. "We have a good team spirit at the Aberdeen Citizen and we work together to make sure that every resident in Aberdeen City and Shire gets their paper!" The Aberdeen Citizen expanded progressively since its launch and won "The Best Free Newspaper In Scotland" Award.

In 2002, the Office of Fair Trading handed Aberdeen Journals a fine for predatory pricing for advertising in the Citizen. Its then-owners, Northcliffe Newspapers, expressed disappointment with the ruling.

The paper's print version ceased publication on 23 May 2018. However, its online version has been merged with The Press and Journal.

== See also ==
- The Press and Journal
- Evening Express (Scotland)
