= NECR =

Local radio station in Kintore, Aberdeenshire, Scotland

Coordinates: 57.2311°N 2.3477°W

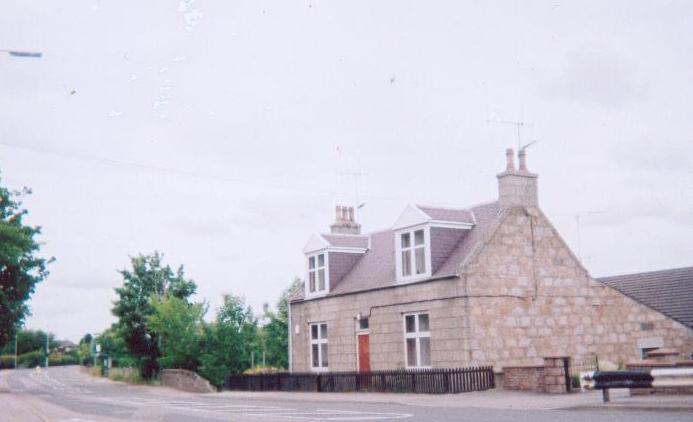
- "The Very Nice Shed" in Kintore, the former studio of NECR.
- Kintore; Scotland

History
- First air date: June 1994; 32 years ago
- Last air date: 15 August 2018; 8 years ago

NECR (short for North East Community Radio) was a broadcast radio station based in Kintore, Aberdeenshire, Scotland. NECR was awarded an Independent Local Radio Licence in 1993 and started broadcasting in June 1994. The station was a totally independent radio station and was accountable to a small local board of directors. NECR broadcast from a studio on School Road in Kintore (8 miles (13 km) north west of Aberdeen). The studio was referred to on air and in the address as "the very nice shed" or "the shed". NECR served an area of some 7,000 square miles (18,000 km^{2}) in the North East of Scotland.

The station announced on air that it would be closing at midnight on 15 August 2018 as a result of difficult trading conditions.

== Frequencies ==
The frequencies were 102.1 in Aberdeen and the surrounding areas NECR also broadcast online via its own website. The station was received in North East Scotland on 97.1FM, 101.9FM, 102.6FM, 103.2FM and 106.4FM depending on location and was also available on DAB from Switchdigital's Aberdeen multiplex, however the stream was 64 kbit/s mono only.

== Programming ==
The daily programming included The Breakfast Show, The Mid Morning/Early Afternoon Show, The Afternoon Show, and Drivetime. Competitions regularly featured including The Brekky Brainteaser, Guess the Intro and The Afternoon Quiz. The programmes were presented in an informal rolling format and all programmes were conducted live.

The station featured a range of music from 1950s and 1960s music to current hits. NECR also featured national and local news and a variety of local interest items such as the Lamb Bank, Farming Focus (during the breakfast show), The Pet File (for lost and found pets) and Recruitment Classifieds (job advertisements from local companies). The station broadcast live programmes between 6am and 10pm with automated music broadcast throughout the night.

The station had a series of specialist programmes in the evening such as the "Ceilidh Hour" and Country Jamboree. Former presenters include John Dean, Gordon Bathgate, Colin Gale, James Reid, Duncan Mckay, Kevin Ritchie, George Findlay, Kevin Sherwin and George Milne. By far the most popular programme was the weekday night Hit Factor show that was broadcast from 9pm till midnight–despite its huge popularity the station owners moved around the original presenters to other slots ultimately leading to the shows demise. Other presenters took over the show but never captured the audience figures and the station owners decided to scrap the show in favour or a continuous loop of music

== See also ==
- Community radio in the United Kingdom
- shmuFM
- Mearns FM
