= ShmuFM =

Community radio station in Aberdeen

shmuFM
- Aberdeen; Scotland
- Frequencies: FM: 99.8 MHz; DAB+: 9C
- RDS: _shmuFM

Programming
- Languages: English; Polish

Ownership
- Operator: Station House Media Unit

History
- First air date: 17 March 2005

Links
- Webcast: Listen to 99.8fm online
- Website: www.shmu.org.uk/fm

shmuFM (/ʃmuː/ SHMOO) is a community radio station operating in Woodside, Aberdeen. It is owned by Station House Media Unit, trading as SHMU.

== History ==
SHMU was established in 2003 and shmuFM started broadcasting on the Internet at 9:30 am on 17 March 2005. It received a broadcast licence from Ofcom in 2005 and began FM broadcasting on 20 October 2007.

SHMU was given the Queen's Award for Voluntary Service in 2020.

In 2022 SHMU applied for a licence to operate a DAB ensemble (multiplex) in the North Aberdeen area as part of Ofcom's third round of advertised small-scale DAB licences. It was granted the licence in July 2022 and shmuFM began broadcasting on DAB+ in February 2024. Mearns FM started broadcasting on the ensemble in July 2025.

== See also ==
- Media in Aberdeen
- Community radio in the United Kingdom
- Mearns FM
- NECR
