= Inverurie Academy =

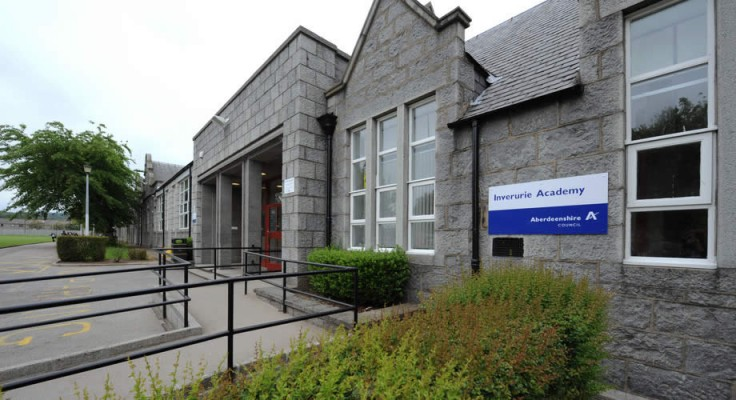
- The entrance to the old school building.

Location
- Off Market Place; Jackson Street; Inverurie, Aberdeenshire, AB51 3PX; Scotland; 57.2831°N 2.3772°W

Information
- Type: Secondary school
- Motto: Latin: Spiritus Intus Alit (The spirit within sustains)
- Established: 1909; 115 years ago
- Local authority: Aberdeenshire Council
- Rector: Neil Hendry
- Staff: 96.7 (FTE)
- Gender: Co-educational
- Age: 11 to 18
- Enrolment: 1292
- Houses: Barra Bees Crichie Chameleons Selbie Stags Harlaw Hawks Davah Dragons Thainstone Thrashers
- Colour: Anything Goes
- School years: S1-S6
- Website: Inverurie Academy

Inverurie Academy is a comprehensive secondary school in Inverurie, Aberdeenshire. The school is one of the 17 secondary schools run by Aberdeenshire Council. Inverurie Academy is located on Jackson Street, Inverurie. As of 2023, the academy ranked 177th out of 347 with 35% of students securing 5 or more highers.

Inverurie Academy has several feeder schools including Strathburn Primary, Chapel of Garioch Primary, Uryside Primary, Port Elphinstone Primary, Oyne Primary, Kellands Primary, Hatton of Fintray Primary, and Keithhall Primary. Insch Primary and Kinellar Primary hold dual zone status.

== History ==
Built in the Victorian period, the school was originally split into both a secondary school and a primary, although after Market Place the need for a primary decreased and the building was merged in 1909, keeping primary pupils until the statutory leaving age of 14, the other taking the pupils who had passed their qualifying exam on to higher education. This was the founding of the building known as Inverurie Academy. Since then, new parts of the school have been added, the most recent in the mid-1980s prior to the demolition.

The buildings remained that way until they were joined in the 1950s, and amalgamated in the 1960s with the building of the new assembly hall. The final stage of building was constructed in the 1980s.

In 2002, to reduce pressures on the Ellon Academy and the Inverurie Academy, the Meldrum Academy was established.

Construction began for a new building including a £55 million new community campus set to include new car and bus parking, a 3G pitch, expanded facilities, and accommodation for up to 1,600 pupils in 2018.

The academy, as well as the community swimming pool, Saint Andrew's Special School, and the Garioch Community Centre, transitioned to the newly built Inverurie Community Campus in the 2020 school year. In 2022, the original Academy was demolished following delays due to the discovery of Asbestos within the school building.

== COVID-19 ==
Inverurie Academy was praised for its handling of the COVID-19 pandemic, with an inspector stating the academy was "very well placed to continue its improvement journey" During the pandemic, National 5 exams were cancelled across Scotland, including Inverurie, being replaced with online coursework's and assessments.

== Notable former pupils ==
- Andrew Bowie (born 1987), Member of Parliament for West Aberdeenshire and Kincardine since 2017
- Stuart Corsar (born 1984), former rugby union player
- Gareth Dennis (born 1991), rail engineer and writer
- Lewis Macdonald (born 1957), politician
- Helen Rushall (1914–1984), schoolteacher and feminist
- Ethel Simpson (1926–2017), journalist
- Callum Smith (born 1992), former cross-country skier
- Sarah Smith, Member of Parliament for Hyndburn since 2024
