= Sedona International Film Festival =

Annual film festival held in Sedona, Arizona

Coordinates: 34.8631°N 111.7971°W

- Location: Sedona, Arizona, U.S.
- Founded: 1994
- Website: sedonafilmfestival.org

The Sedona International Film Festival (SIFF) is an annual, eight-day film festival in Sedona, Arizona, United States. The festival was founded in 1994.

== History ==
In 2023, the festival was named one of MovieMaker's "20 Great Film Festivals in Vacation Destinations."

=== Notable attendees ===
- Pierce Brosnan
- Nicolas Cage
- Richard Dreyfuss
- Michael Moore
- Rita Rudner
- Gary Sinise
- Keely Shaye Smith
- Lea Thompson
- Jonathan Winters

=== Lifetime Achievement Award winners ===
- Jane Alexander (2018)
- Jacqueline Bisset (2023)
- Joan Collins (2013)
