= Balmedie =

Coordinates: 57.25°N 02.05°W

Balmedie: Scottish Gaelic: Baile Mheadhain
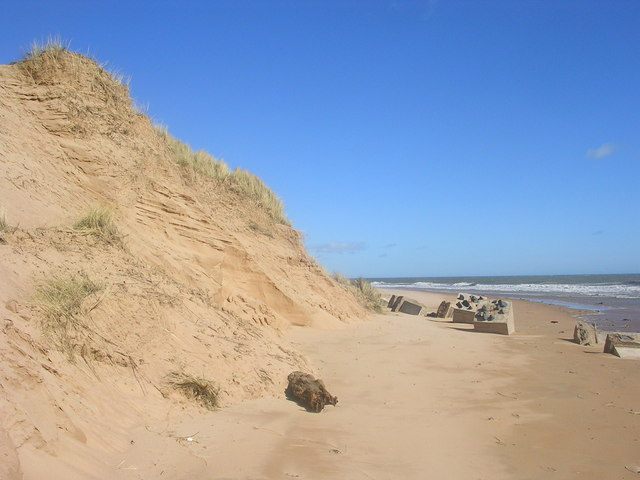
- Sand dunes at Balmedie in 2006

- Location within Aberdeenshire
- Population: 2,510 (2020)
- OS grid reference: NJ965178
- Civil parish: Belhelvie
- Council area: Aberdeenshire
- Lieutenancy area: Aberdeenshire
- Country: Scotland
- Sovereign state: United Kingdom
- Post town: ABERDEEN
- Postcode district: AB23
- Dialling code: 01358
- Police: Scotland
- Fire: Scottish
- Ambulance: Scottish
- UK Parliament: Gordon and Buchan
- Scottish Parliament: Aberdeenshire East

Balmedie (Scottish Gaelic: Baile Mheadhain) is a large village in Aberdeenshire, Scotland. It lies north of the city of Aberdeen, in the civil parish of Belhelvie, and is adjacent to a long, wide sandy beach backed by an extensive dune system.

Balmedie lies immediately south of the Sands of Forvie Site of Special Scientific Interest, which forms part of the wider Ythan Estuary coastal system. The dune landscape, dominated by marram grass, is one of the largest in Britain and supports a variety of coastal habitats and wildlife.

== Balmedie village ==
The village's facilities include a primary school, a small library and a sports centre. Shops include a small supermarket, a pharmacy, a fish and chip shop, Chinese takeaway and a convenience store/post office. Other services include a car mechanic, and the White Horse Inn (a hotel, bar and restaurant). In 2007, Barratt Developments established its Barratt Homes North Scotland headquarters in Balmedie. Stagecoach East Scotland provides 'Bluebird' bus services linking the area with Aberdeen, Ellon, Fraserburgh and Peterhead.

There are four small play parks in Balmedie; there are also two full-sized football pitches where amateur side Trophies International play their home matches. Footballers Cammy Smith and Scott Wright were both raised in Balmedie, where they were neighbours and attended the local primary school before progressing through Aberdeen’s youth system.

== Balmedie Country Park ==
The Balmedie Country Park provides amenities within the dunes for visitors, including parking, toilets, wooden walkways across the sands and streams, picnic areas with barbecues, and a swing park with a fishing theme. The park is often used by horse riders as a starting / finishing point for beach rides with room to park a horsebox or trailer.

During the Second World War, Balmedie Beach was designated as a bomb cemetery. Defused and unexploded bombs from Luftwaffe raids in Aberdeen were brought here to be cleaned of explosives or detonated on the foreshore. Three pillboxes were built on the dunes at Balmedie to protect a small radar station consisting of three masts. Anti-tank blocks are also located in the dunes along with remains of the barbed wire defences just to the north.

== Menie Estate ==
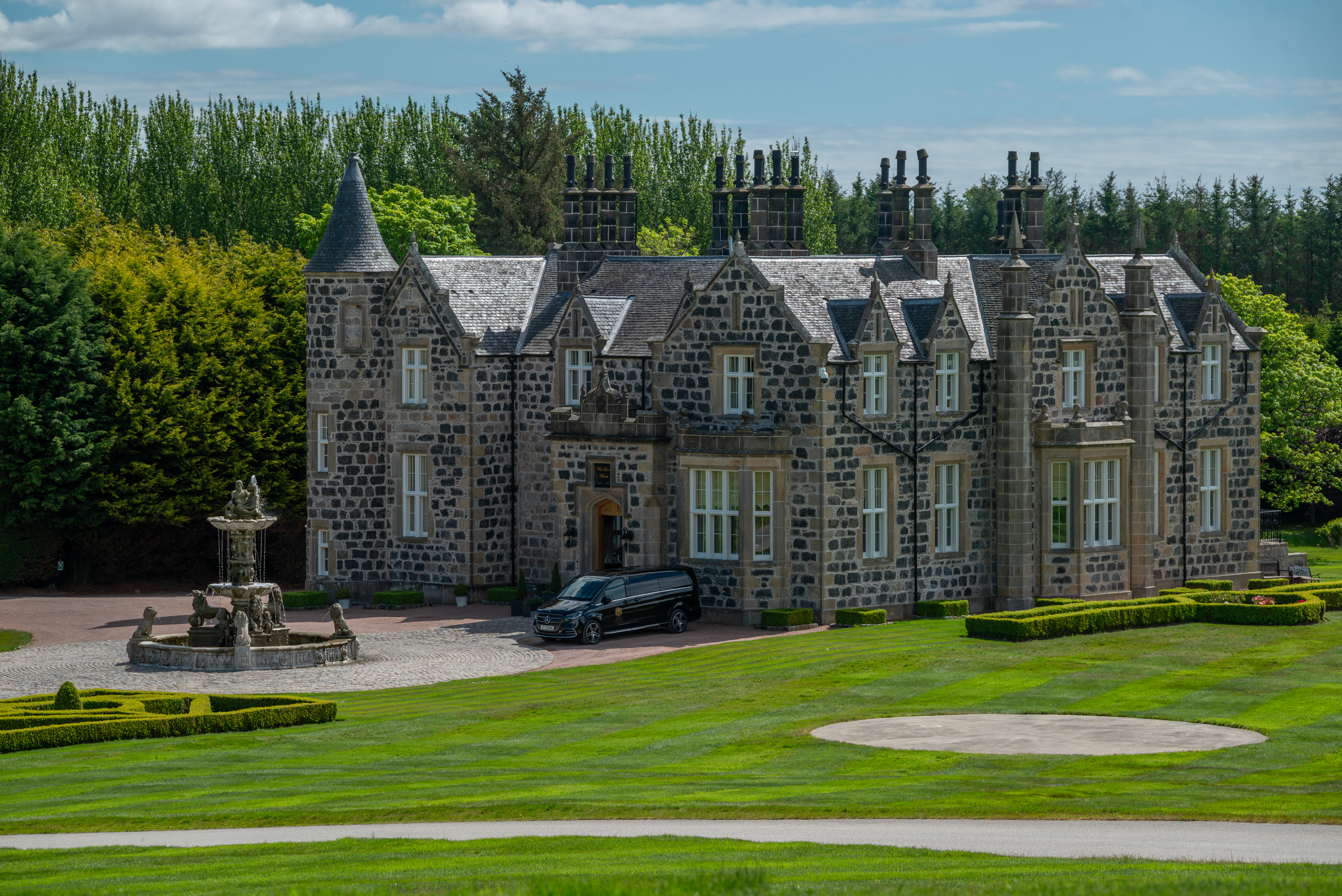
Menie House

Menie House is a 14th-century country property surrounded by over 200 acres (81 ha) of private land, collectively known as the Menie Estate. The house was designed by the Aberdeen architect John Smith for George Turner around 1835. It is listed as category B by Historic Scotland.

During the Second World War, a beach minefield was laid beside the Mill of Menie in case of a German invasion. The minefield was cleared by the 11th Coy Bomb Disposal under Major W.M. Hewitt of the Royal Engineers. During construction of the Menie golf course, the rusting harmless fragments of a landmine were found.

In 2006, Donald Trump purchased a large part of the estate to create the Trump International Golf Links and proposed to build an extensive development, including two 18-hole golf courses, a 450-room hotel, conference centre and spa, 36 golf villas, 950 holiday homes, accommodation for 400 staff and residential developments comprising 500 houses. Although this would substantially damage habitat at a Site of Special Scientific Interest, according to analysis by Scottish Natural Heritage, planning officials from Aberdeenshire Council recommended approval of the development. This subject was covered by documentary film maker Anthony Baxter in his 2011 film You've Been Trumped.

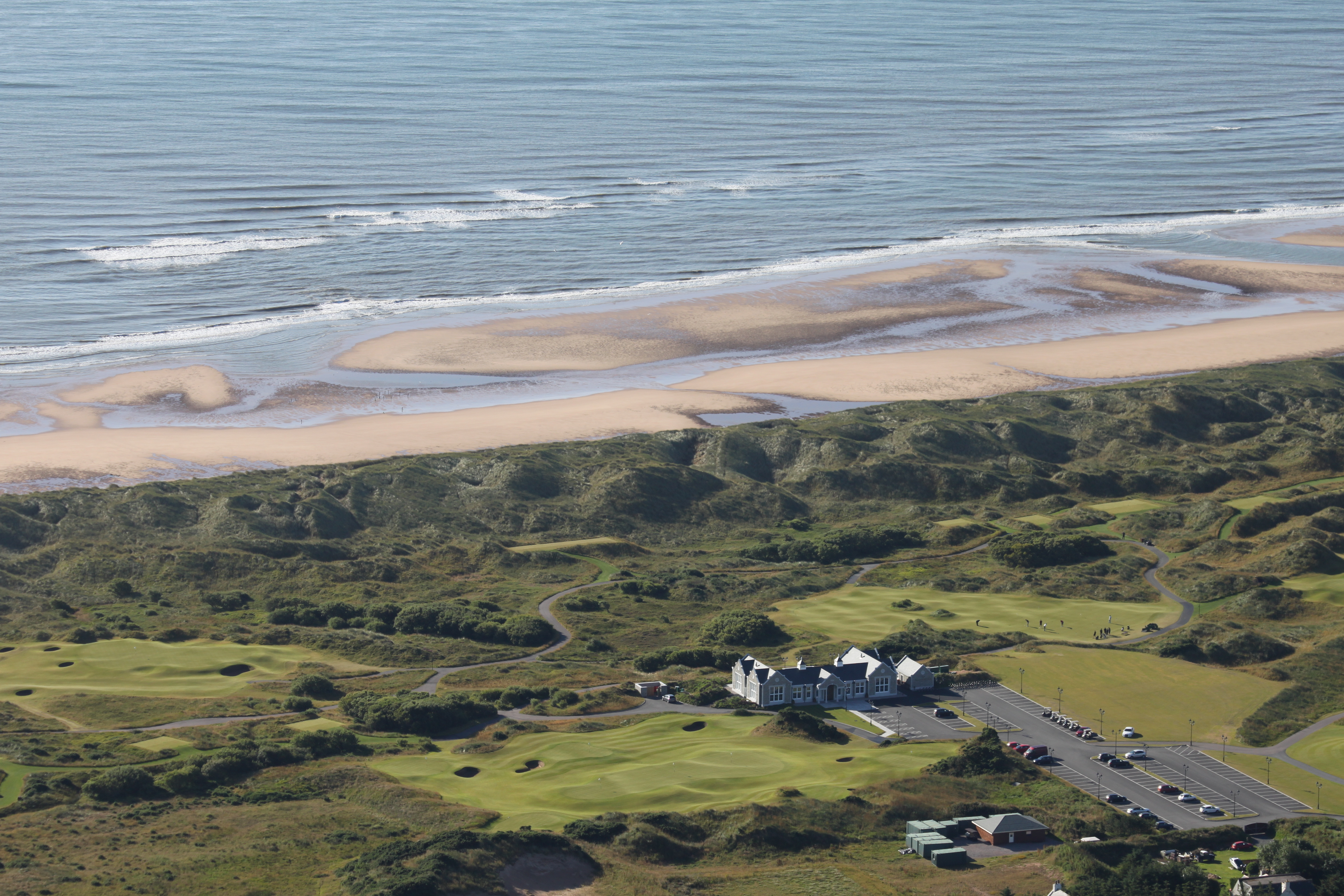
Trump links at Menie

=== Legal dispute ===
In December 2015, Trump's attempt to prevent a windfarm being built within sight of his golf course was dismissed by five justices at the Supreme Court. Commenting on the decision, former Scottish First Minister Alex Salmond branded Trump "three times a loser", in reference to his losses in lower Scottish courts leading up to the Supreme Court case. A spokesman for the Trump Organization responded to Salmond's comment by saying: "Does anyone care what this man thinks? He’s a hasbeen and totally irrelevant."

The director of WWF Scotland stated, "This result is great news for Scotland and for all those interested in tackling climate change and creating jobs".

Vattenfall decided to proceed with 11 turbines in the 92 MW wind farm in July 2016. The project, formally named the European Offshore Wind Deployment Centre, was completed in late 2018.
