= Glenbank =

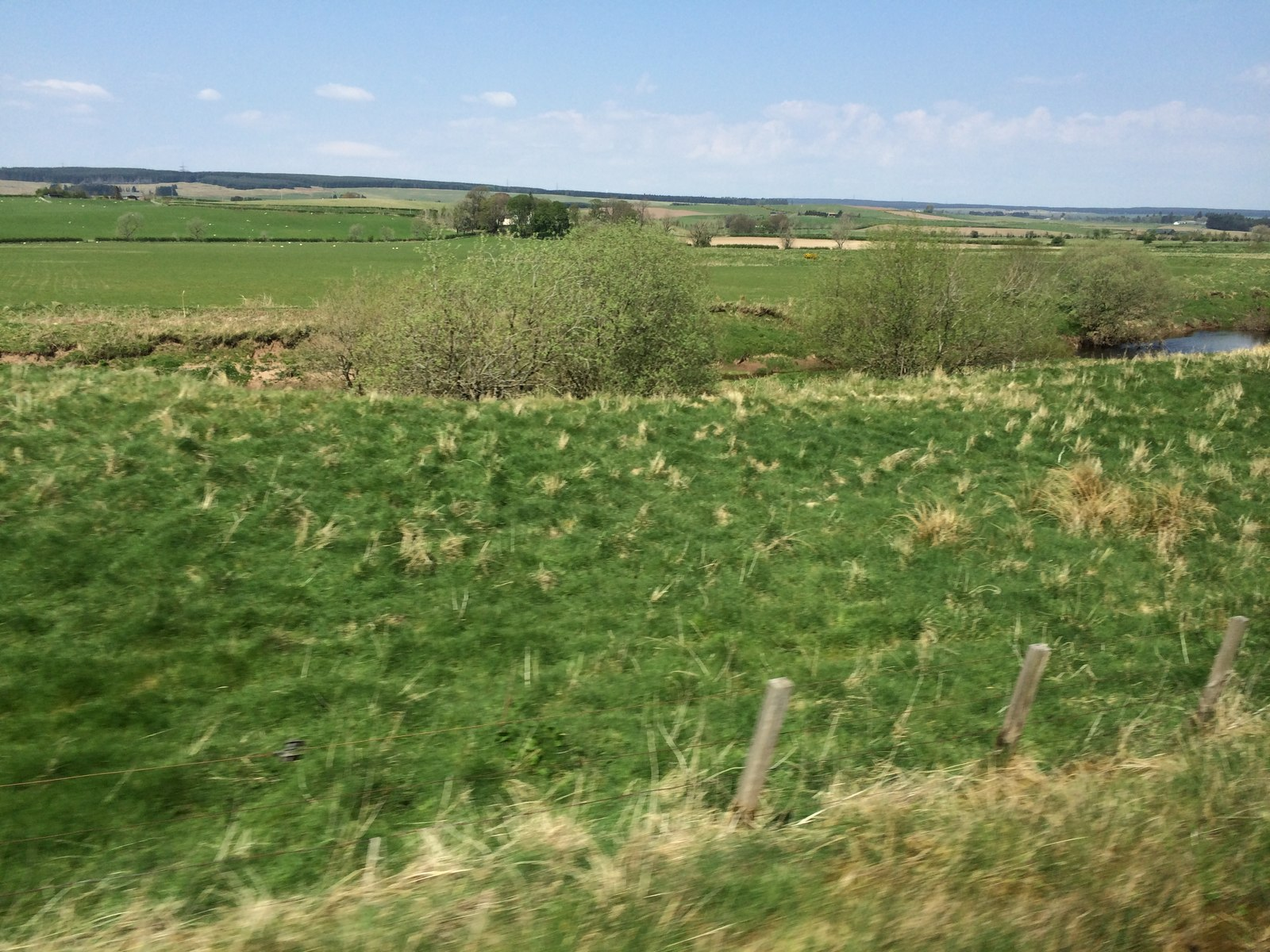

- Location within Scotland Central Belt Location within Scotland
- 56.229069°N 3.917625°W
- Location: Scotland

Glenbank was the site of a Roman fortlet associated with the Gask Ridge in Scotland. It was discovered from aerial photography by G. S. Maxwell in 1983. It was confirmed by geophysics and excavations which were carried out in 1984 and 1999. It is beside the Roman road that linked the forts at Ardoch and Doune. It is currently the most southerly of the known Gask fortifications. It was probably built around 70-80 AD. Several other Gask installations have been identified running north to Bertha.

The site is south of the Allan Water close to the A9 road. It seems to have been deliberately demolished by the Romans when they abandoned it.

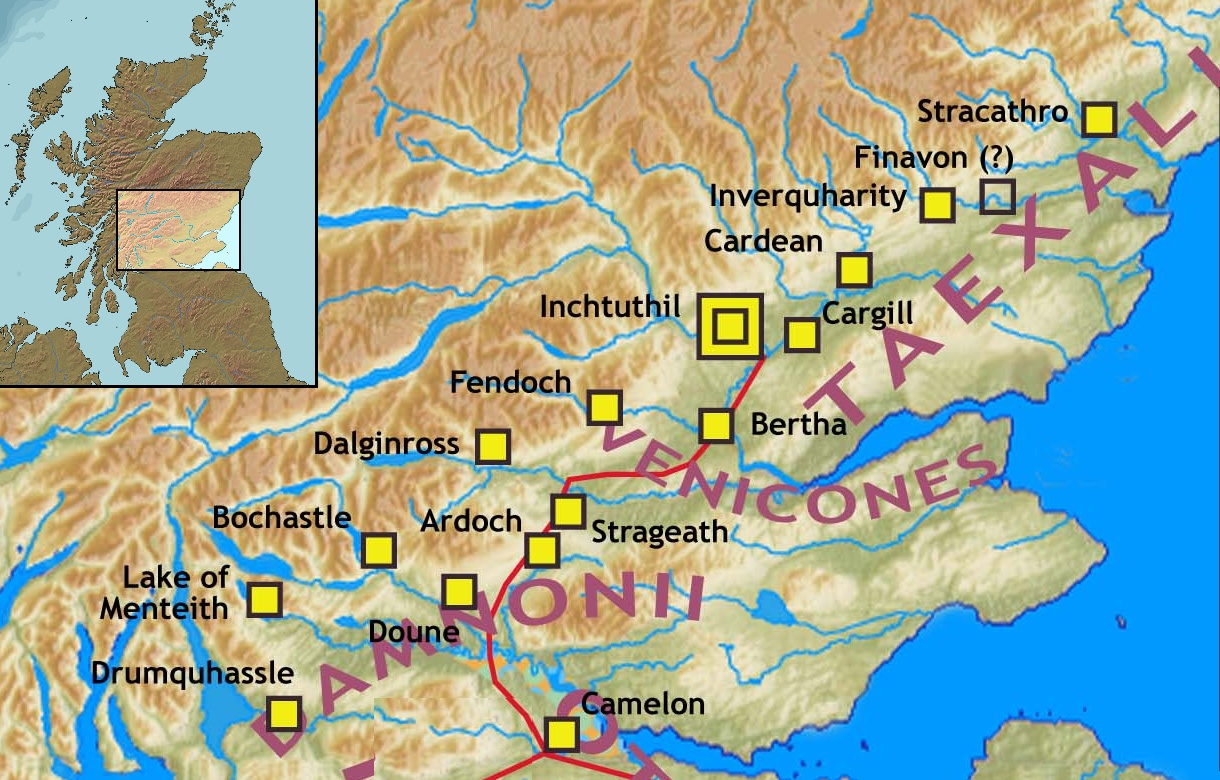
Forts and Fortlets associated with the Gask Ridge from south to north Balmuildy, Cadder, Castlecary, Mumrills, Camelon, Drumquhassle, Malling, Doune, Glenbank, Bochastle, Ardoch, Sheilhill, Strageath, Dalginross, Midgate, Bertha, Fendoch, Cargill, Cardean, Inchtuthil, Inverquharity, Stracathro
