= Drumquhassle =

Coordinates: 56.0561°N 4.43557°W

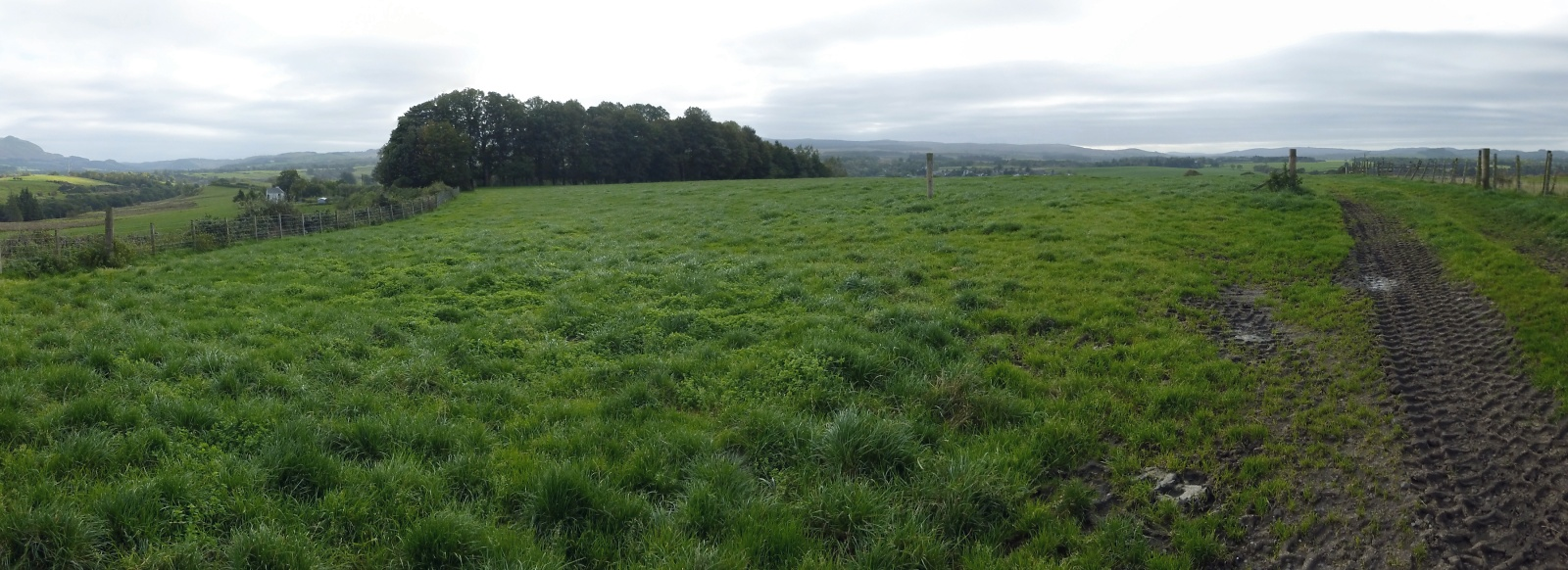
- Site of Drumquhassle Roman Fort
- Interactive map of Drumquhassle
- Location: Stirling, United Kingdom

Drumquhassle was a Roman fort associated with the Gask Ridge in Scotland. It was found from aerial photography in the late 1970s. The name selected for the fort deliberately made it hard for English born readers to pronounce. The fort was from the Flavian period; it was built and briefly occupied during the administration of Sallustius Lucullus. It is known as a "Glen-blocker" fort and is located within sight of Loch Lomond.

== Location ==
The fort is located in Stirlingshire, east of Drymen. It is associated with the road running from Loudoun Hill past Barochan towards Malling, Bochastle and Dalginross. This road was therefore on the Highland Boundary Fault Frontier.

It may have been on more than one Roman road. It has been suggested that Drumquhassle might be connected to Doune via the Fords of Frew.

The glenblocker forts ran from Drumquhassle to Stracathro. The fort is about 50 metres (160 ft) west of a reliable spring which was presumably the soldiers' main water source.

== Finds ==
An enamelled brooch was found as well as some sling bullets. Pottery from Gaul known as Terra nigra was also recovered. Several coins were also found.

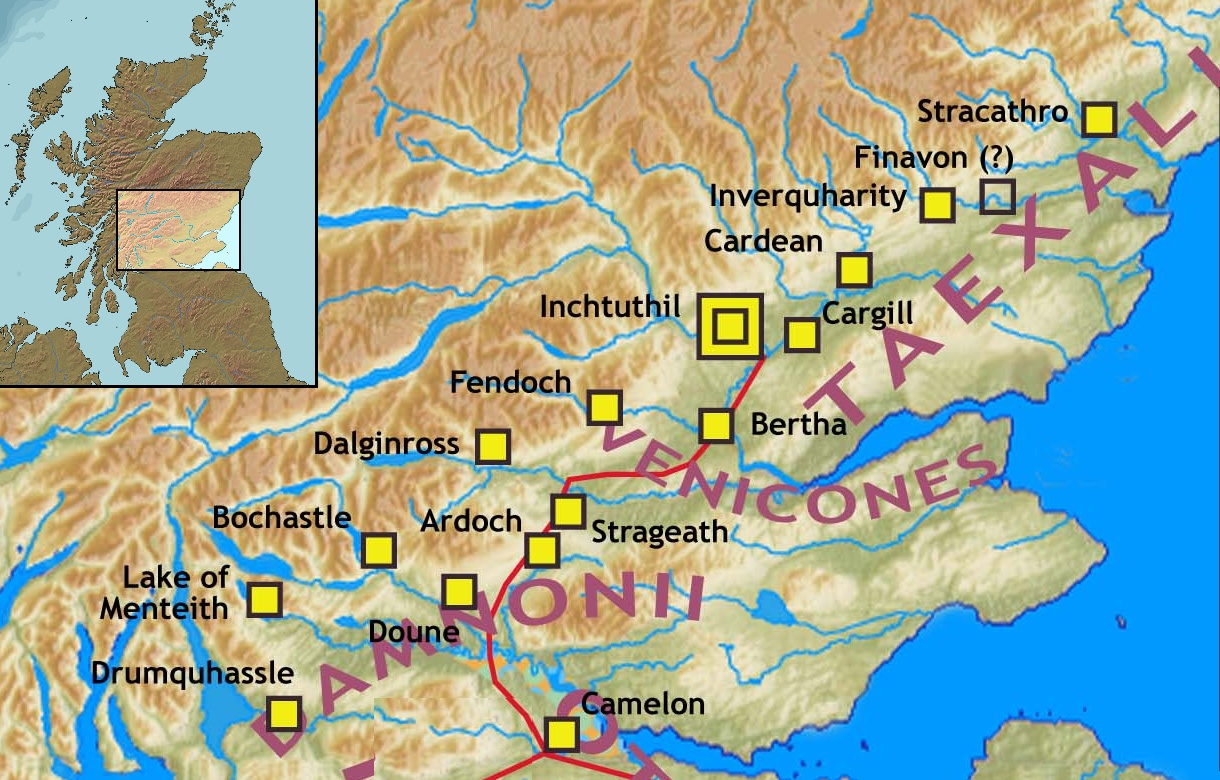
Forts and Fortlets associated with the Gask Ridge from south to north Balmuildy, Cadder, Castlecary, Mumrills, Camelon, Drumquhassle, Malling, Doune, Glenbank, Bochastle, Ardoch, Sheilhill, Strageath, Dalginross, Midgate, Bertha, Fendoch, Cargill, Cardean, Inchtuthil, Inverquharity, Stracathro
