= Lake of Menteith =

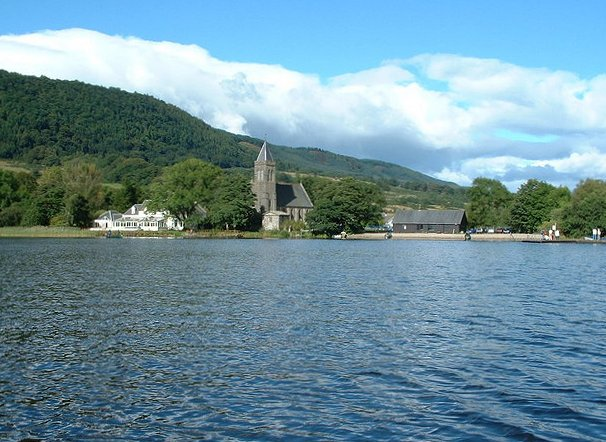
- Looking towards Port of Menteith

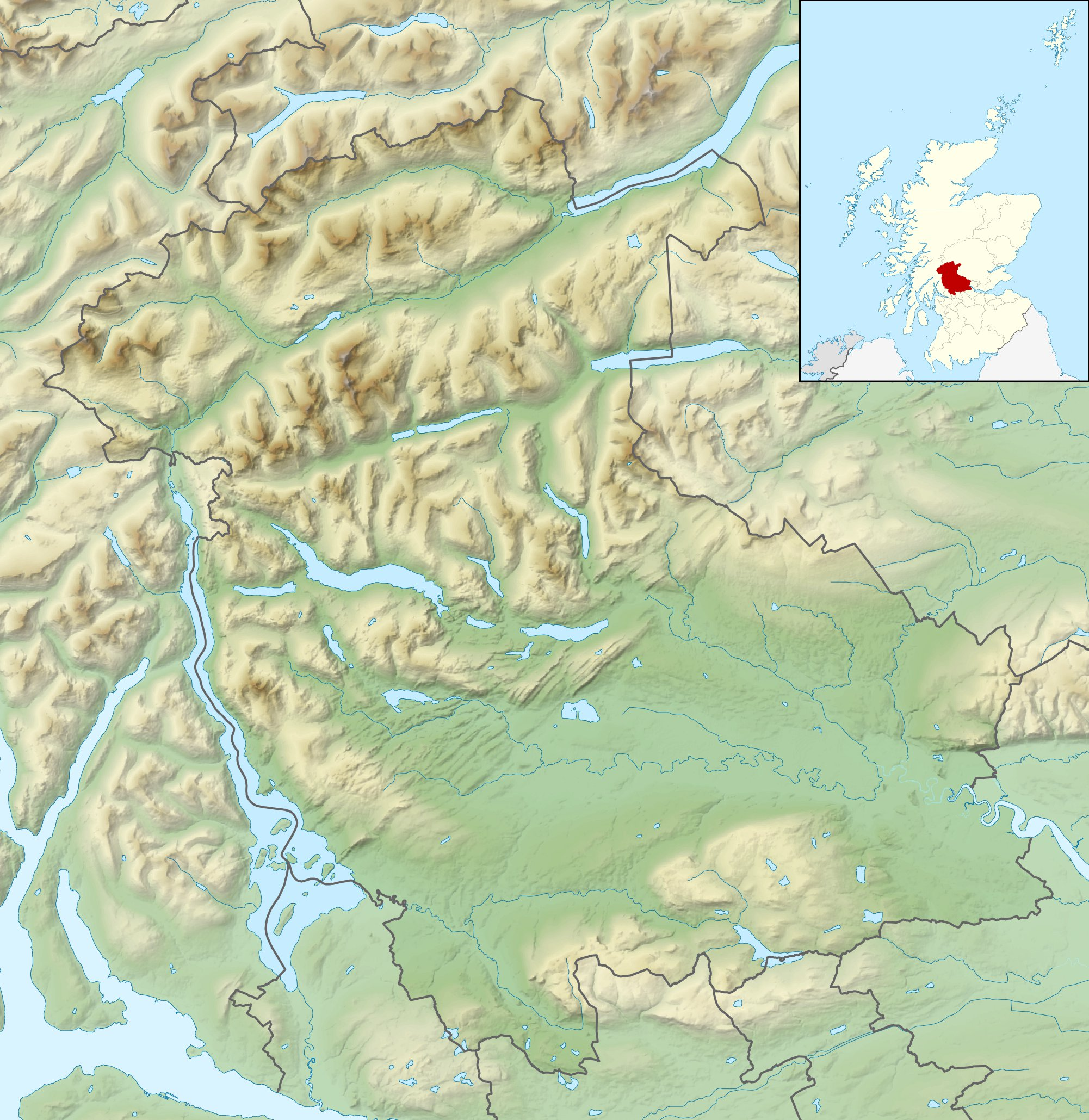
- Location within Stirling
- Coordinates: 56.1744°N 4.2921°W
- Type: freshwater loch
- Primary outflows: River Forth
- Max. length: 2.4 km (1.5 mi)
- Max. width: 1.6 km (1 mi)
- Surface area: 252 ha (620 acres)
- Average depth: 6.02 m (19.75 ft)
- Max. depth: 23 m (77 ft)
- Shore length^{1}: 9.7 km (6.0 mi)
- Surface elevation: 18 m (59 ft)
- Islands: Inchmahome, Dog Isle, Inch Talla
- ^{1} Shore length is not a well-defined measure.

Lake of Menteith, also known as Loch Inchmahome (Scottish Gaelic: Loch Innis Mo Cholmaig), is a loch in Scotland located on the Carse of Stirling (the flood plain of the upper reaches of the rivers Forth and Teith, upstream from Stirling).

== Name ==
Until the early 19th century, the loch was more commonly known by the Scottish name, “Loch of Menteith”, although, on the 1654 map, Blaeu Atlas of Scotland, it is identified as “Loch Inche Mahumo”. The only settlement of any size on the Loch of Menteith is the Port of Menteith.

== Geography ==
There are a number of small islands in the loch. On the largest, Inchmahome, is Inchmahome Priory, an ancient monastery. The priory served as refuge to Mary, Queen of Scots, in 1547. She was only four years old at the time and stayed for three weeks after the disastrous Battle of Pinkie Cleugh in September of that year. The loch is not particularly deep and can freeze over completely in exceptionally cold winters. If the ice becomes thick enough, at least 7 inches (18 cm), an outdoor curling tournament called the Bonspiel (or the Grand Match) is held on the loch. The event can attract thousands of curlers even though it is held very infrequently. The last Grand Match was held in 1979. The Bonspiel that had been planned for 2010 was abandoned on health and safety grounds.

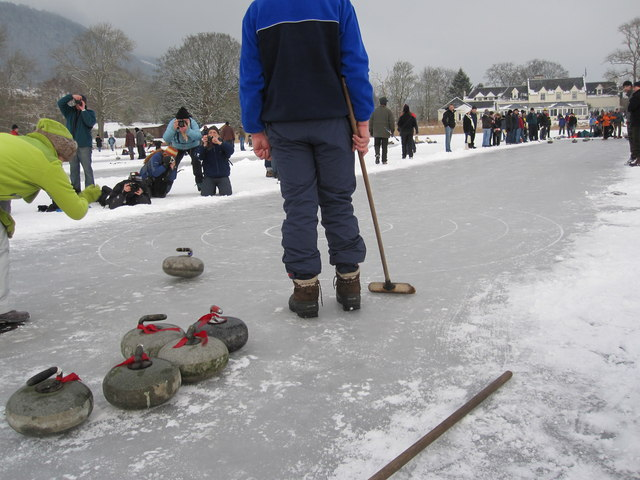
Curling on Lake of Menteith

The Lake of Menteith is often thought of as the only body of water in Scotland that is referred to as a lake. Actually, there are several others, some of which have been artificially created: Pressmennan Lake, East Lothian; the Lake of the Hirsel, Berwickshire; Lake Louise (within the grounds of Skibo Castle, Sutherland); Raith Lake, Fife; Upper Lake and Kelly Lake (both near Haddo House, Aberdeenshire); Pitfour Lake and Cally Lake (near Gatehouse of Fleet, Kirkcudbrightshire). There is also a sea bay near Kirkcudbright known as Manxman's Lake. Nearly all other major bodies of water in Scotland are known as lochs.

The unusual name “Lake of Menteith” is believed to be due to the UK Government's Ordnance Survey in 1838 who mapped the area for the first time, and identified it as a “lake” because it was referred to as a lake in literature that was prominent at the time.

== Malling Roman Fort ==
There was a Roman fort at a site associated with the Gask Ridge, to the west of the lake. The Romans may have referred to the site as "Lindon". It was discovered by David Wilson and Kenneth St Joseph in 1968 when they were conducting an aerial survey of Flanders Moss. After taking aerial photographs, they assessed the site by measuring resistance and magnetic susceptibility at ground level.

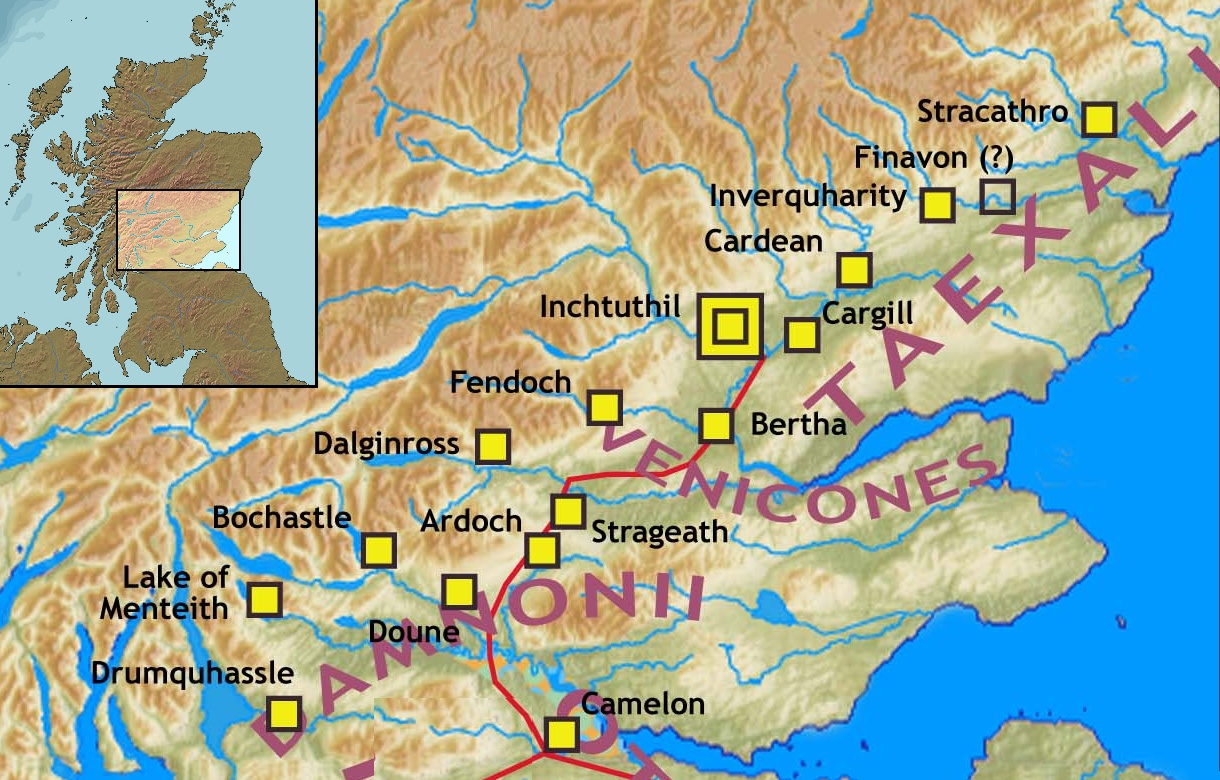
Forts and Fortlets associated with the Gask Ridge from south to north Balmuildy, Cadder, Castlecary, Mumrills, Camelon, Drumquhassle, Malling, Doune, Glenbank, Bochastle, Ardoch, Sheilhill, Strageath, Dalginross, Midgate, Bertha, Fendoch, Cargill, Cardean, Inchtuthil, Inverquharity, Stracathro

== In popular culture ==
In 2020, the lake was featured in the BBC programme Springwatch, presented by wildlife photographer Gordon Buchanan.
