= River Earn =

River in Scotland

River Earn Scottish Gaelic: Uisge Èireann
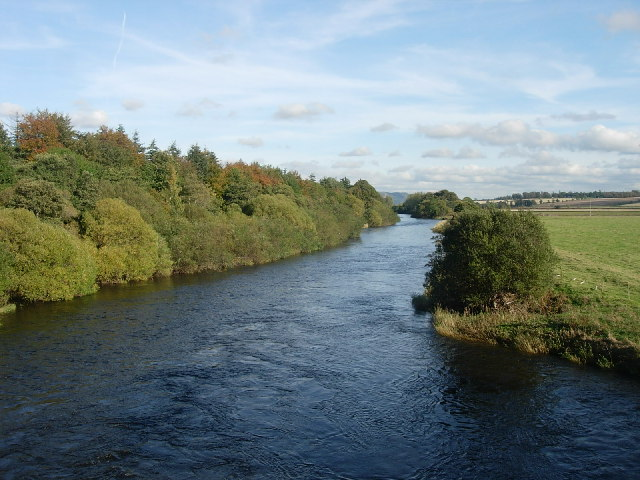
- The River Earn viewed from Forteviot bridge.

Location
- Country: Scotland

Physical characteristics
- Source: St Fillans
  - location: Loch Earn, Perth and Kinross, Scotland
  - coordinates: 56.3907°N 4.1122°W
  - elevation: 99 m (325 ft)
- Mouth: Firth of Tay, North Sea
  - location: Between Perth and Newburgh, Fife, Scotland
  - coordinates: 56°21′N 3°19′W
  - elevation: 0 m (0 ft)
- Length: 74 km (46 mi)

Basin features
- Tributaries
  - left: River Lednock
  - right: River Farg

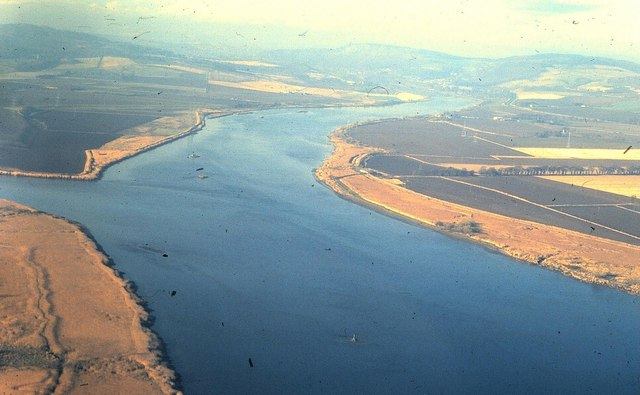
Confluence of Rivers Earn (left) and Tay.

The River Earn (Scottish Gaelic: Uisge Èireann) in Scotland leaves Loch Earn at St Fillans and runs east through Strathearn, then east and south, joining the River Tay near Abernethy. The Earn is about 74 kilometres (46 mi) long. It passes by Comrie, Crieff (where it is joined by the Pow of Inchaffray) and Bridge of Earn. The river is fast flowing, with many shoals, whilst the surrounding land is generally flat and is occasionally subject to flooding.

Near to the River Earn lay the ancient Strageath Roman Camp. This camp was one of a series of camps used by the Romans to construct their invasion of the north; other notable camps in this chain are Ardoch, Stracathro, Battledykes, Raedykes and Normandykes.

== Leisure and tourism ==
The river is popular for walking, and the banks are accessible at many points. One of the most popular walks is a route along the north bank at Crieff known as Lady Mary's Walk.

=== Fishing ===
Fishing is available on many sections of the river. The Earn forms part of the area of the Tay District Salmon Fisheries Board, the statutory body that controls and manages stocks of salmon and trout along all rivers within the Tay catchment area. Fishing permits are issued by the individual estates for each section of the river. The River Earn Improvement Association, a voluntary organisation composed of fishing rights holders and local angling clubs, works to improve fish stocks in the river. As part of this work the association has gradually purchased the rights to undertaken commercial salmon fishing with fixed nets at locations on the Earn. The association does not exercise these rights, and purchased them in order to improve salmon numbers in the river. By 2005 all commercial netting had been eliminated from the Earn.

== River Earn National Scenic Area ==
The section of the river between Comrie and St Fillans forms part of a national scenic area (NSA), one of 40 such areas in Scotland which are defined so as to identify areas of exceptional scenery and to ensure its protection by restricting certain forms of development. The River Earn NSA covers 3,108 ha, all of which lies within Perth and Kinross.

The original 1978 report that led to the area being designated as a national scenic area noted:

This upper part of Strathearn lies at the conjunction of highland and lowland scenery and the variety of landscape elements that derive from this combination result in a very distinctive character of pleasing appearance. There is a strong textured pattern resulting from the variety of vegetation and landform. The hillsides are punctuated by rocky outcrops and patterned with heather, bracken, grass or plantation. The valley has a strong sense of enclosure though the hills are not high. There is an intimacy of scale reinforced by the strong human influence of well managed farmland and woodland but the hill tops have a wild rugged character. Plantations make a major contribution to the scene, the shape and extent of afforested areas respecting and relating well to the natural landform. There are very fine strands of broadleaved trees in the form of woodlands, parklands and hedgerow plantings, and the river is alternatively swift and leisurely, open-meadowed or alder enclosed. Buildings are generally traditional in appearance and in tune with their surroundings. This is a landscape of great harmony.

— Scottish Natural Heritage (1978)
