= Hadrianic Society =

British historical society for Hadrian's Wall

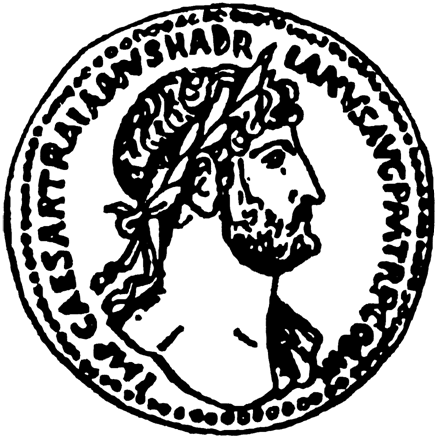
- Logo of the Hadrianic Society.
- Formation: 1971
- Type: Learned society
- Purpose: Historical & Archaeological
- Location: Durham
- Members: 120 (approx.)
- Activities: Research & publications, lectures & events
- Founder: Brian Dobson
- President: David Breeze
- Affiliations: Durham University
- Website: hadrianicsociety.com

The Hadrianic Society was a British historical society focused upon Hadrian's Wall and Roman Britain as well as the Antonine Wall, the Gask Ridge, and other Roman Frontier systems. It was founded in 1971 under the leadership of Brian Dobson, David Breeze, and Valerie Maxfield. The Hadrianic Society closed in 2018. Some of its functions continue to be fulfilled by the Roman Army School.

== History ==
The purpose of the society is to promote the study of Hadrian's Wall, the Roman Army, and Roman frontiers. The Hadrianic Society developed out of a series of courses held for former students and amateurs originally involved with the excavations at the Roman site of Corbridge under the guidance of Brian Dobson. Peter Connolly was involved with the Society throughout the 1980s and the annual 'Roman Army School' conference held by the Society is cited as directly influencing the work of Lawrence Keppie and Birgitta Hoffmann.

The society was covered in Current Archaeology in 2010.

== Publications ==
- P. Hill (ed.). 2002. Polybius to Vegetius: Essays on the Roman army and Hadrian's Wall presented to Brian Dobson to mark his 70th birthday. Durham: The Hadrianic Society.
- Parker, A. (ed.) 2017. Ad Vallum: Papers on the Roman Army and Frontiers in Celebration of Dr Brian Dobson (BAR British Series 631). Oxford: British Archaeological Reports.

=== Bulletin ===
The Bulletin of the Hadrianic Society is an annual journal containing primarily papers based on the presentations at the Roman Army School of the previous year as well as additional peer-reviewed contributions and reviews of academic texts. It is edited and published internally. Copies of the bulletin are available in the British Library.

=== Newsletter ===
The Newsletter is a triannual publication produced, edited, and printed internally available to all society members and includes the non-academic reports, discussions, and reviews that are not relevant to the bulletin. Contributions by members are frequently published.

== See also ==
- Birgitta Hoffmann
- Brian Dobson
- David Breeze
- Adrian Goldsworthy
- Hadrian
- Roman Military
- Roman Britain
