= Gask Ridge =

Roman fortifications in Scotland

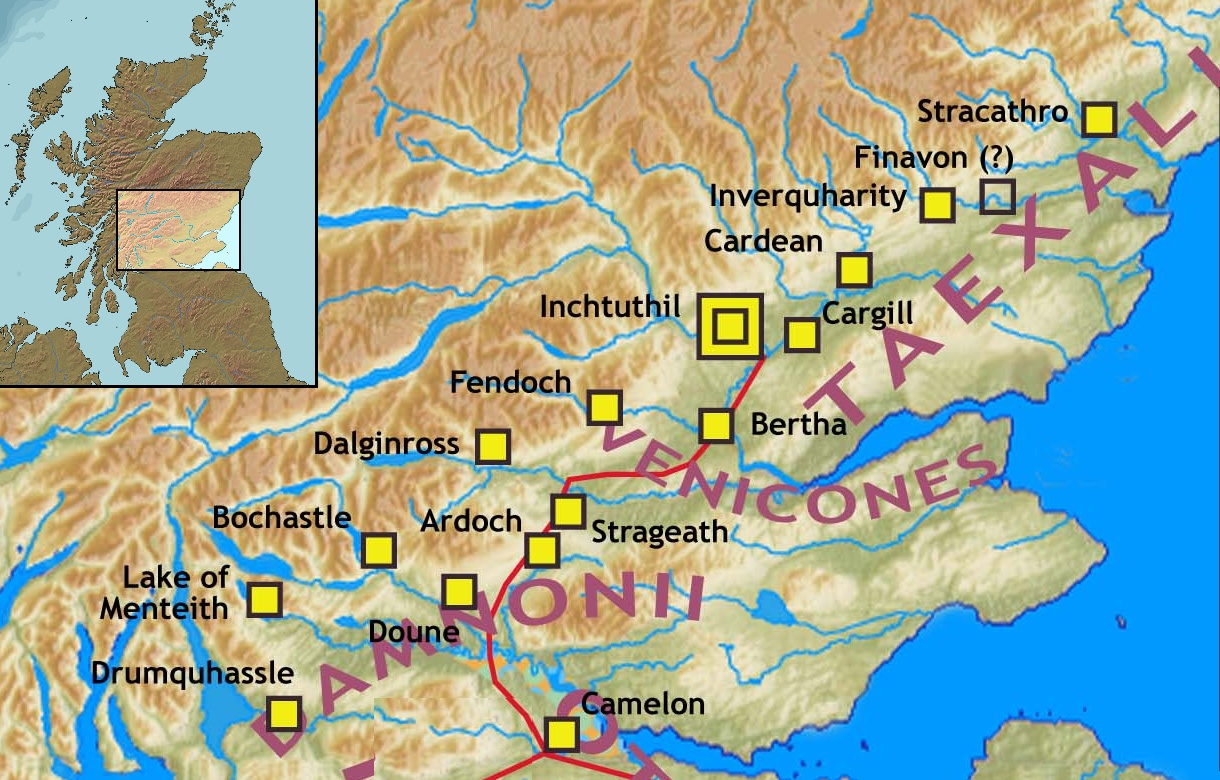
Forts and Fortlets associated with the Gask Ridge from south to north Balmuildy, Cadder, Castlecary, Mumrills, Camelon, Drumquhassle, Malling, Doune, Glenbank, Bochastle, Ardoch, Sheilhill, Strageath, Dalginross, Midgate, Bertha, Fendoch, Cargill, Cardean, Inchtuthil, Inverquharity, Stracathro

The Gask Ridge is the modern name given to an early series of fortifications, built by the Romans in Scotland, close to the Highland Line. Modern excavation and interpretation has been pioneered by the Roman Gask Project, with Birgitta Hoffmann and David Woolliscroft. The ridge fortifications: forts, fortlets and watchtowers were only in operation for a few years, probably fewer than ten.

== Name ==
The name "Gask Ridge" refers to the 10-mile (16 km) ridge of land to the north of the River Earn in Perthshire. In Scottish Gaelic, a gasg is a projecting tail or strip of land. In the early 20th century, a line of Roman signal-towers (or watch-towers) was discovered along this ridge between the Roman forts of Strageath and Bertha.

== History ==
The Gask Ridge system was constructed sometime between 70 and 80 AD. Construction on Hadrian's Wall was started 42 years after completion of the Gask Ridge (from 122 to 130 AD), and the Antonine Wall was started 12 years after completion of Hadrian's Wall (from 142 to 144 AD). Although the Gask Ridge was not a wall, it may be Rome's earliest fortified land frontier. The fortifications approximately follow the boundary between Scotland's fertile Lowlands and mountainous Highlands, in Perth and Kinross and Angus. The later Hadrian's Wall and Antonine Wall were further south and considerably shorter.

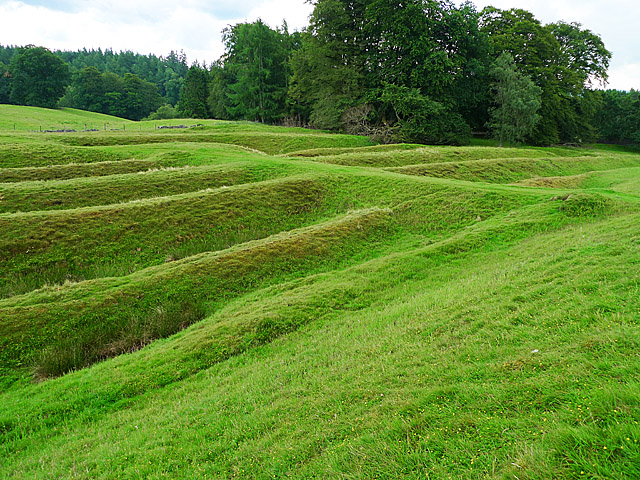
The well-preserved ditches and ramparts of Ardoch Roman Fort

The principal forts of the Gask Ridge frontier system were (from south to north): Camelon, Drumquhassle, Malling, Doune, Glenbank (fortlet), Bochastle, Ardoch, Kaims Castle (fortlet), Strageath, Dalginross, Bertha, Fendoch, Cargill (fort and fortlet), Inchtuthil (Legionary fortress), Cardean, Inverquharity (fortlet) and Stracathro.

=== Glenblocker forts ===
The forts of Drumquhassle, Menteith/Malling, Bochastle, Doune, Dalginross and Fendoch in the south-west were collectively referred to as glenblocker forts in the older literature; they are also called the Highland line forts. Glenblocker describes their location at the exit of some of the glens.

All of the forts were originally built during the Flavian occupation in Scotland. A broader group consists of

- Drumquhassle (near Drymen, overlooking the southern end of Loch Lomond and the road back to the Clyde)
- Malling (on the Lake of Menteith, overlooking the access to the Duke's Pass and a narrow point between the mountains and the Forth Mosses)
- Bochastle (near Callander), overlooking the road to Loch Katrine and the Pass of Leny
- Dalginross (near Comrie) overlooking the Eastern end of Loch Earn
- Fendoch (north of Crieff) overlooking the Sma' Glen
- Inchtuthil (below Dunkeld) The legionary fortress at the mouth of Strath Tay, guarding the main roads to Inverness
- Inverquharity (near Kirriemuir) a fortlet-sized station at the east end of Glen Clova

Cardean, Stracathro and Doune are sited further away from their respective traffic corridors, although fulfilling the same function.

=== Watchtowers ===
A line of watchtowers sit on the Roman Road which you can drive along and then walk when the road turns off.

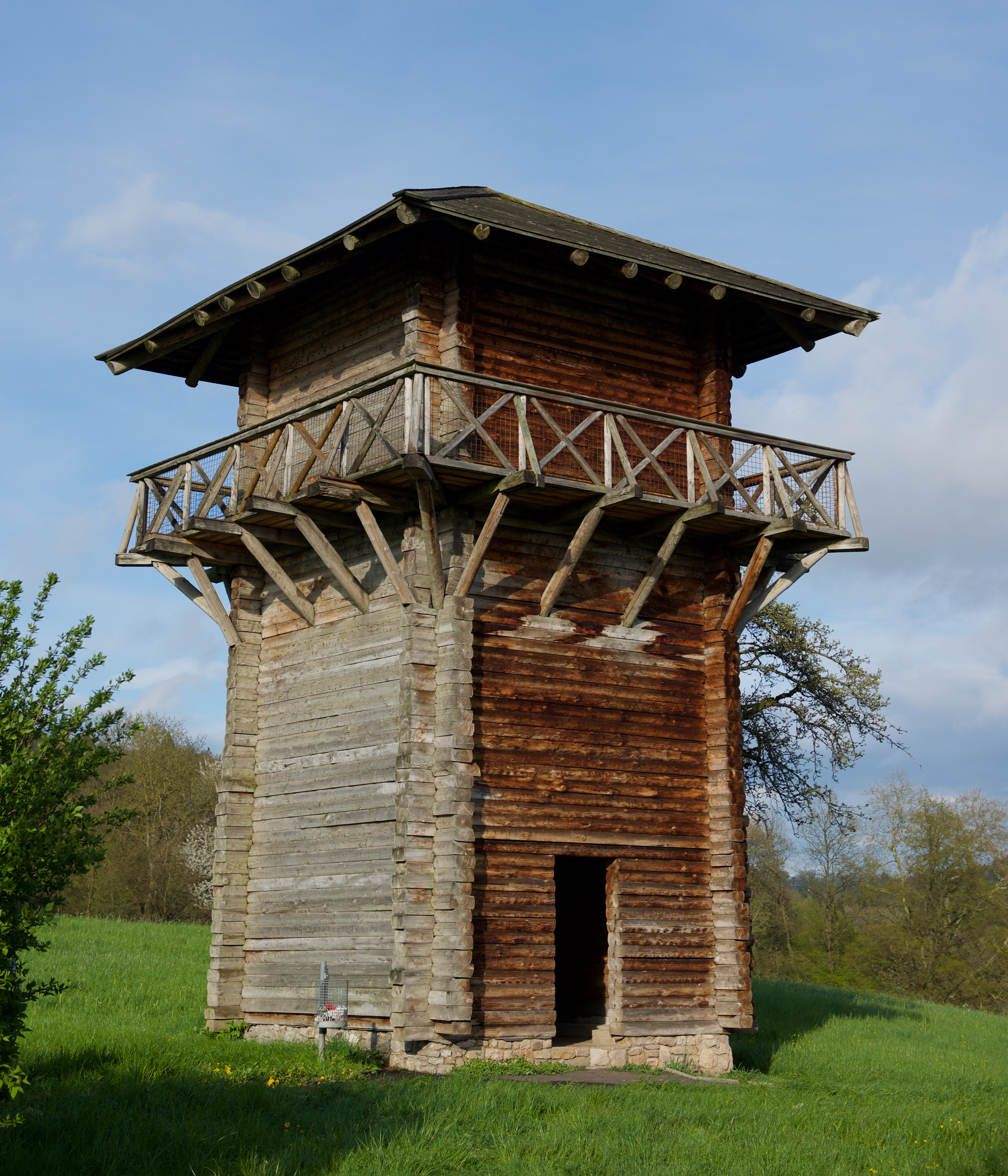
Replica Roman Watchtower in Germany

There are 16 known Roman watchtowers: Ardunie Watchtower, Parkneuk Watchtower, Raith Watchtower (Site of), Muir o'Fauld Watchtower, Kirkhill Watchtower, Gask House Watchtower, Roundlaw Watchtower (Site of), Witches Knowe Watchtower Moss Side Watchtower (Site of), Thorny Hill Watchtower, Peel Roman Watchtower (Site of), West Mains Watchtower (Site of), Westerton Watchtower (Site of), Blackhill Wood Watchtower, Westmuir Watchtower, Greenloaning Watchtower. The design of the watchtowers is consistent with those on the River Rhine, and it is thought the Scottish ones were built first.

=== Role ===
It has traditionally been thought that these forts were meant to prevent invasions out of the Scottish Highlands into Roman-held territory. This may have been the intention, in cooperation with the other forts on the Gask Ridge and along Strathmore, as only the legionary fortress of Inchtuthil with 5,000–6,000 soldiers would have been strong enough to deal with a major incursion. The smaller forts were more likely to serve as a disincentive to small-scale raiding parties.

The relationship between the Glenblocker forts and the Gask Ridge has in the past been seen as a staged withdrawal. Recent research suggests that the three elements are part of the same frontier system, stretching roughly from Loch Lomond to Montrose. In this hypothesis, the Glenblocker forts controlled access to valleys in the frontier area, which loop back into the frontier, rather than link with the Iron Age settlements further north. Their value as a block to invasion is doubtful, as their situation would have allowed supervision but they lacked the manpower to deter anything but cattle rustling.

Only the legionary fortress at Inchtuthil, conveniently situated for access into Braemar and its hinterland, is large enough to have functioned as a defensive fortification or a jumping-off point for an invasion. The Gask Road and the towers alongside it in this hypothesis guarded the strategically important link to the harbours at the Firths of Tay and Forth and the southern part of the province.

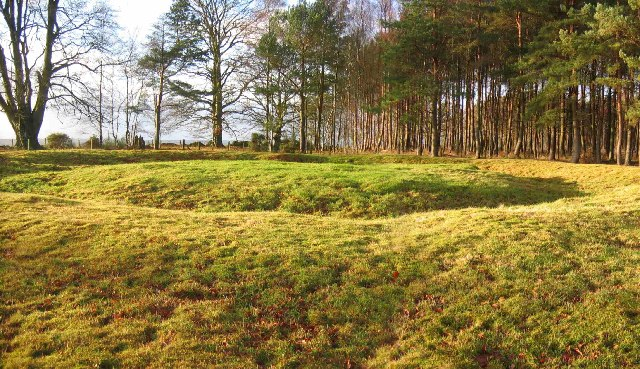
Site of a Roman signal tower at Kirkhill

Tacitus writes in De vita Iulii Agricolae that Agricola was fighting in the area in around 80 AD; the latest coinage dates from 86 AD. This would suggest that the forts were occupied for six years at most. Recent archaeology has shown that many of the forts on the Gask Ridge were rebuilt, sometimes twice, without evidence of destruction through warfare. Further digs may cast some light on this apparent contradiction.

The forts of Ardoch, Strageath and Bertha on the Gask Road, as well as the forts of Cargill in Strathmore and the glenblocker fort of Dalginross have also produced Antonine material attesting to a reuse of the sites contemporary with the Antonine Wall. In the Severan period the army passed through the area, and several camps across Scotland are dated to this period (for example, Kair House in Aberdeenshire and the fort at Carpow Roman Fort which is on the Firth of Tay.

== North of the Gask Ridge ==
The permanent sites are complemented by a series of large marching camps (large camps date to the 3rd century) from the Scottish Lowlands into Aberdeenshire and Moray. The Roman legions in the 1st century established a chain of forts at Ardoch, Strageath, Inchtuthil, Battledykes (which is unlikely to date from the same period as the Gask sites), Stracathro and Raedykes, taking the Elsick Mounth on the way to Normandykes, before going north to Glenmaillen and Auchinhove. Unconfirmed sites of possible Roman forts have also been found at Bellie, Balnageith and Cawdor.

In the 1990s researchers discovered new possible Roman fortifications north of Inverness and the Moray Firth. The most important are Tarradale and Portmahomack. These are being studied by Royal Commission on the Ancient and Historical Monuments of Scotland to verify that they are Roman. Several chronological reconstructions of their role have been made.

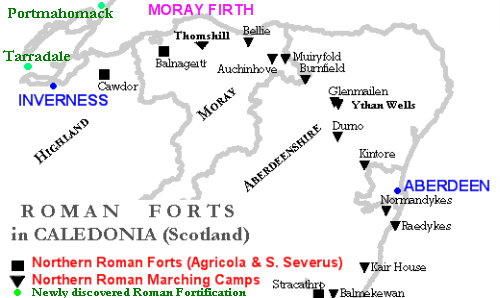
Some Roman camps in northern Scotland

== See also ==
- Hadrianic Society
- Birgitta Hoffmann
- Roman Britain
- Roman Scotland

== Bibliography ==
- Breeze, D. Northern Frontiers of Roman Britain (1982)
- Breeze, D. 'Roman Scotland (2007)
- Hanson William, G.Maxwell. Rome's North-west Frontier: The Antonine Wall (1986)
- Hanson, William S. "The Roman Presence: Brief Interludes", in Edwards, Kevin J. & Ralston, Ian B. M. (Eds) (2003) Scotland After the Ice Age: Environment, Archaeology and History, 8000 BC – AD 1000. Edinburgh. Edinburgh University Press.
- Hanson, William S. Roman Campaigns North of the Forth-Clyde Isthmus: The Evidence of the Temporary Camps, Proc Soc Antiq Scot, vol. 109 142, 145 Edinburgh, 1980.
- Macdonald, G. (1916) The Roman Camps at Raedykes and Glenmailen, Proc Soc Antiq Scot, vol. 50 348–359
- Maxwell, G. S. (1980) Agricola's Campaigns: The Evidence of the Temporary Camps, Scot Archaeol Forum, vol. 12, 34, 35, 40, 41
- Moffat, Alistair (2005) Before Scotland: The Story of Scotland Before History. London. Thames & Hudson. ISBN 0-500-05133-X
- Pitts, L. Inchtuthil. The Roman Legionary Fortress. Britannia Monograph Series 6 (1985)
- Robertson, A. S. (1976) Agricola's Campaigns in Scotland and their Aftermath, Scot Archaeol Forum, vol. 7 4
- St Joseph, J. K. (1951) Air Reconnaissance of North Britain, J Roman Stud, vol. 41 65
- Woolliscroft, D. and Hoffmann, B. The First Frontier. Rome in the North of Scotland (Stroud: Tempus 2006)
