= Black Hill Roman Camps =

Roman military camps in Scotland, UK

- Location within Perth and Kinross

General information
- Architectural style: Roman camp
- Location: Ardoch, Perth and Kinross, Scotland
- Coordinates: 56.27644°N 3.875773°W
- Completed: early AD 200

Black Hill Roman Camps are two Roman camps that are part of an extensive complex of Roman military sites centred around the fort at Ardoch, Perth and Kinross, Scotland. They were built along the Gask Ridge during the re-conquest of Scotland by the emperor Septimius Severus.

The camp is about 0.5 miles (0.80 km) north of the Ardoch Roman Fort in Braco.
