= Birgitta Hoffmann =

British archaeologist (born 1969)

- Born: 18 May 1969 (age 57); Maisières, Belgium
- Education: Ustinov College; University of Durham Universitaet Freiburg
- Known for: Study and new interpretation of Gask Ridge, Roman Military installations, Roman frontiers and Ancient Glass
- Scientific career
- Fields: History; Archaeology
- Workplaces: University of Liverpool; University College Dublin

Birgitta Hoffmann (born 18 May 1969) is an archaeologist and adult education teacher. Her research covers the Roman military, especially the Roman frontiers and ancient glass and beads of the first millennium AD.

== Education and career ==
Hoffmann studied at the University of Durham under Brian Dobson before studying at the University of Freiburg for her PhD.

She was a lecturer at University College Dublin and an honorary research associate at the University of Liverpool, as well as working at Queen's College Canada and the Virginia Military Institute From 1995 she has worked as the co-director of the Roman Gask Project. In 2005 she set up Wilmslow Community Archaeology, a voluntary archaeology and history group in the Wilslow area. Since 2008, she has taught adult education courses in archaeology and classics and is the course director of the Manchester Continuing Education Network.

=== Politics ===
In 2016 Birgitta was the Liberal Democrat candidate for the Wilmslow East Ward local council elections. In 2019 she was the Liberal Democrat candidate for the Wilmslow West ward for the Wilmslow Town Council and Cheshire East Council, and was subsequently elected to the town council.

== Selected publications ==
- Freeman, P., Bennett, J., Fiema, Z., Hoffmann, B. (eds.) 2003. Limes XVIII. Proceedings of the 18th Congress on Roman Frontier Studies, Amman September 2000. BAR International Series 1084. Oxford.
- Hoffmann, B. 1995. 'Quarters of the Legionary Centurions of the Principate', Britannia, Vol.26
- Hoffmann, B. 2002. 'Römisches Glas aus Baden-Württemberg aus Zusammenhängen von 70-260 n.Chr' in Archäologie und Geschichte. Freiburger Forschungen zum ersten Jahrtausend in Südwestdeutschland, 11
- Hoffmann, B. 2004. 'Tacitus, Agricola and the role of literature in the archaeology of the first century AD'. in: E.Sauer (ed.), Archaeology and Ancient History: Breaking down the Boundaries. London: Routledge
- Hoffmann, B. 2013. The Roman Invasion of Britain: Archaeology Versus History. Pen & Sword
- Woolliscroft, D. and Hoffmann, B. 2005. The Romans in Perthshire. Athole Publishing
- Woolliscroft, D. and Hoffmann, B. 2006 Rome's First Frontier. Stroud: Tempus

== See also ==
- Hadrian's Wall
- David Breeze
- Gnaeus Julius Agricola
