= Antonine Wall =

Defensive fortification in Roman Britain

- Location of the Antonine Wall in modern-day Scotland, and Hadrian's Wall now in Northern England
- Interactive map of Antonine Wall
- 55.967°N 4.067°W
- Location: Central Scotland

History
- Built: AD 142
- Built for: Antoninus Pius

Site notes
- Area: 39 miles (63 km)
- Governing body: Historic Environment Scotland

UNESCO World Heritage Site
- Criteria: ii, iii, iv
- Designated: 2008 (32nd session)
- Part of: Frontiers of the Roman Empire
- Reference no.: 430
- Region: Europe and North America

The Antonine Wall (Latin: Vallum Antonini) was a turf fortification on stone foundations, built by the Romans across what is now the Central Belt of Scotland, between the Firth of Clyde and the Firth of Forth. It was built some twenty years after Hadrian's Wall, which was to the south, and was intended to supersede it. While it was garrisoned it was the northernmost frontier barrier of the Roman Empire. It spanned approximately 63 kilometres (39 miles) and was about 3 metres (10 feet) high and 5 metres (16 feet) wide. Lidar scans have been carried out to establish the length of the wall and the Roman distance units used. Security was bolstered by a deep ditch on the northern side. It is thought that there was a wooden palisade on top of the turf. The barrier was the second of two "great walls" created by the Romans in Great Britain in the second century AD. Its ruins are less evident than those of the better-known and longer Hadrian's Wall to the south, primarily because the turf and wood wall has largely weathered away, unlike its stone-built southern predecessor.

Construction began in AD 142 at the order of Roman Emperor Antoninus Pius. Estimates of how long it took to complete vary widely, with six and twelve years most commonly proposed. Antoninus Pius never visited Britain, unlike his predecessor Hadrian. Pressure from the Caledonians probably led Antoninus to send the empire's troops farther north. The Antonine Wall was protected by 16 forts with small fortlets between them; troop movement was facilitated by a road linking all the sites known as the Military Way. The soldiers who built the wall commemorated the construction and their struggles with the Caledonians with decorative slabs, twenty of which survive. The wall was abandoned only eight years after completion, and the garrisons relocated rearward to Hadrian's Wall. Most of the wall and its associated fortifications have been destroyed over time, but some remains are visible. Many of these have come under the care of Historic Environment Scotland and the UNESCO World Heritage Committee.

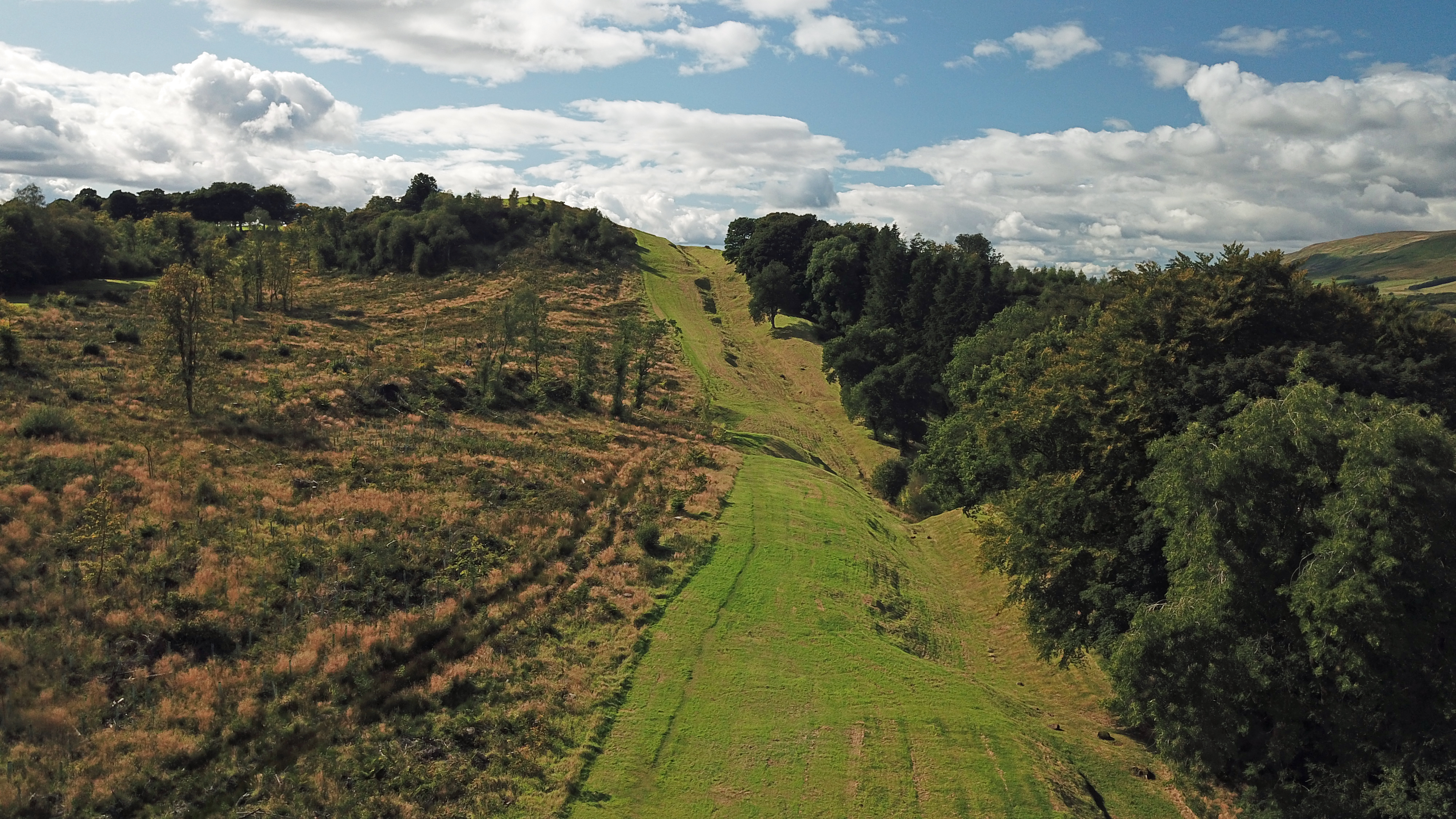
Antonine Wall near Bar Hill showing ditch

== Location and construction ==
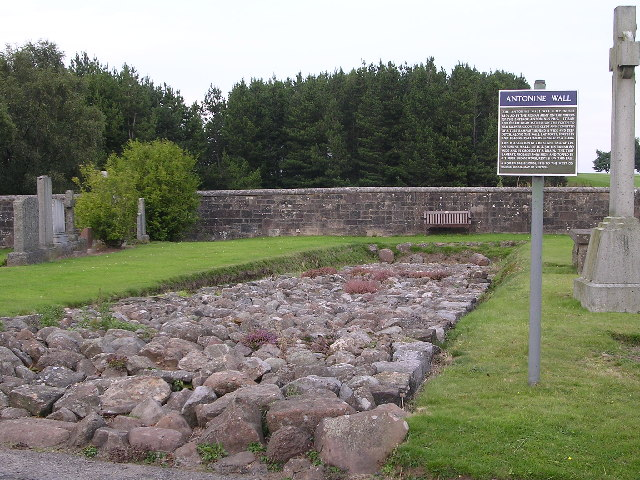
Stone foundation of the Wall in Bearsden, Glasgow

The Roman Emperor Antoninus Pius ordered the construction of the Antonine Wall around 142. Quintus Lollius Urbicus, governor of Roman Britain at the time, initially supervised the effort, which may have taken as long as twelve years. The wall stretches 63 kilometres (39 miles) from Old Kilpatrick in West Dunbartonshire on the Firth of Clyde to Carriden near Bo'ness on the Firth of Forth. The wall was intended to extend Roman territory and dominance by replacing Hadrian's Wall 160 kilometres (100 miles) to the south, as the frontier of Britannia. But while the Romans did establish forts and temporary camps further north of the Antonine Wall in order to protect their routes to northern Britain, they did not conquer the Caledonians, and the Antonine Wall suffered many attacks. The Romans called the land north of the wall Caledonia, though in some contexts the term may refer to the whole area north of Hadrian's Wall. The land north of the Antonine Wall became known as Albany after the settlement of the Gaels in the 6th century.

The Antonine Wall was shorter than Hadrian's Wall and built of turf on a stone foundation, but it was still an impressive achievement. It was also a simpler fortification than Hadrian's Wall insofar as it did not have a subsidiary ditch system (Vallum) behind it to the south. As built, the wall was typically a bank, about three metres (10 feet) high, made of layered turves and occasionally earth with a wide ditch on the north side, and a military way on the south.

The stone foundations and wing walls of the original forts on the Antonine Wall demonstrate that the original plan was to build a stone wall similar to Hadrian's Wall, but this was quickly amended. The Romans initially planned to build forts every 10 kilometres (6 miles), but this was soon revised to every 3.3 kilometres (2 miles), resulting in a total of nineteen forts along the wall. The best preserved but also one of the smallest forts is Rough Castle Fort. In addition to the forts, there are at least nine smaller fortlets, very likely on Roman mile spacings, which formed part of the original scheme, some of which were later replaced by forts. The most visible fortlet is Kinneil, at the eastern end of the Wall, near Bo'ness.

There was once a remarkable Roman structure within sight of the Antonine Wall at Stenhousemuir, which took its name from the Roman "stone house". This was Arthur's O'on, a circular stone domed monument or rotunda, which might have been a temple, or a tropaeum, a victory monument. It was demolished for its stone in 1743, though a replica exists at Penicuik House.

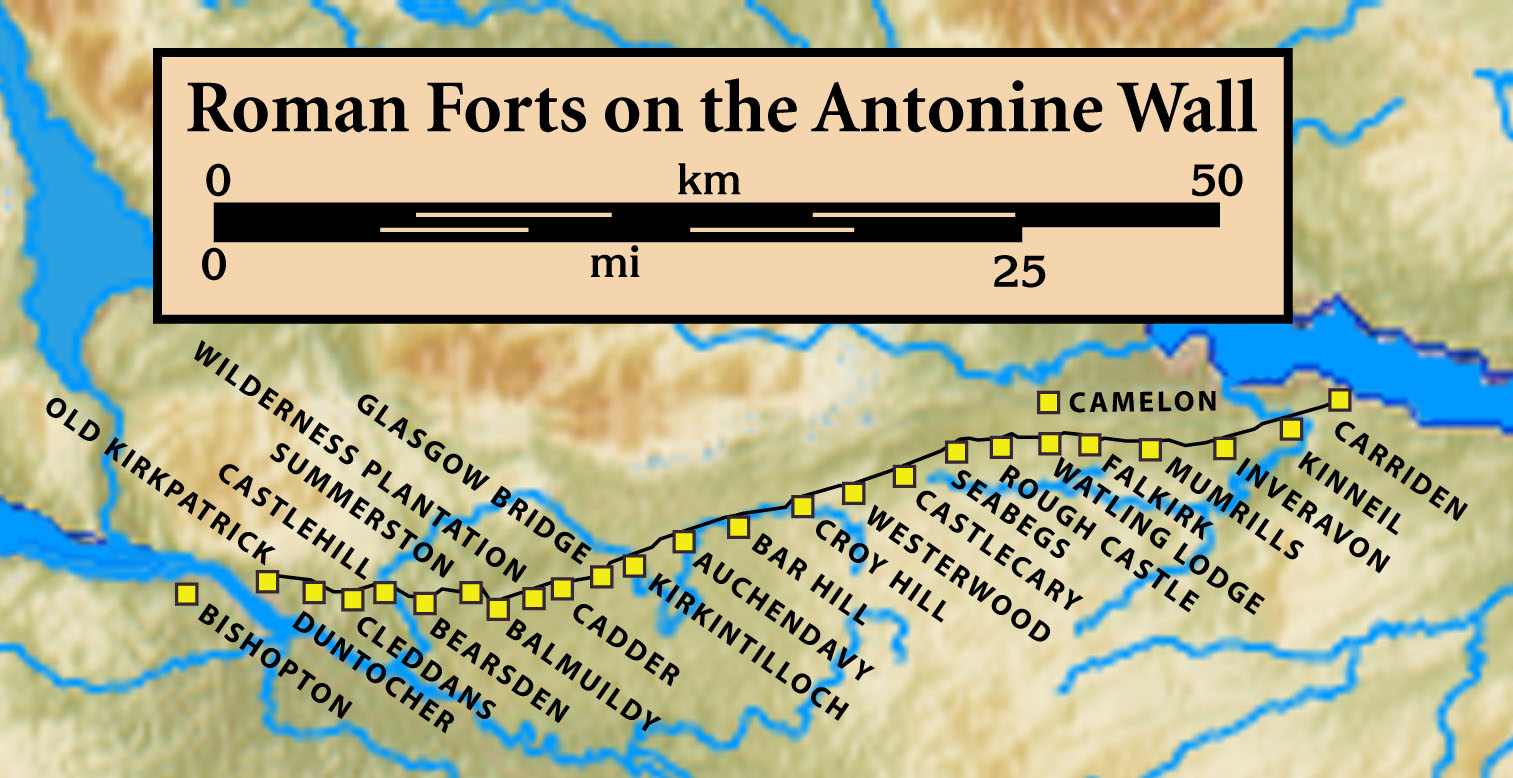
Forts and Fortlets associated with the Antonine Wall from west to east: Bishopton, Old Kilpatrick, Duntocher, Cleddans, Castlehill, Bearsden, Summerston, Balmuildy, Wilderness Plantation, Cadder, Glasgow Bridge, Kirkintilloch, Auchendavy, Bar Hill, Croy Hill, Westerwood, Castlecary, Seabegs, Rough Castle, Camelon, Watling Lodge, Falkirk, Mumrills, Inveravon, Kinneil, Carriden

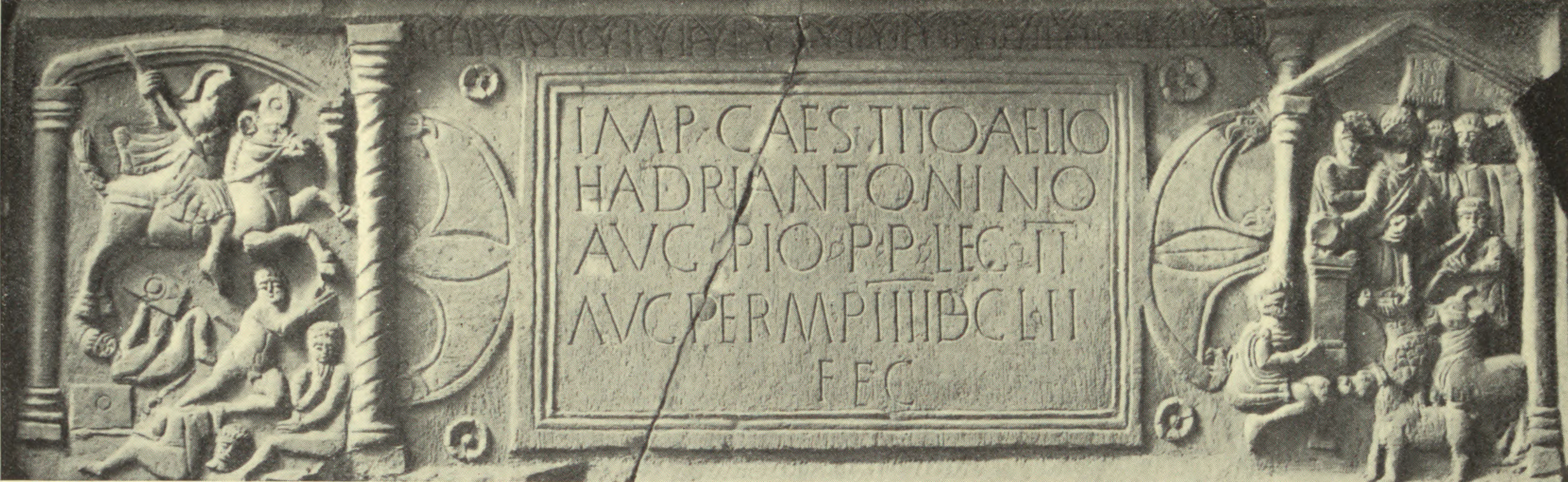
The Bridgeness Slab – the easternmost distance slab

In addition to the line of the Wall itself there are a number of coastal forts both in the East (e.g. Inveresk) and West (Outerwards and Lurg Moor), which should be considered as outposts and/or supply bases to the Wall itself. In addition a number of forts further north were brought back into service in the Gask Ridge area, including Ardoch, Strageath, Bertha (Perth) and probably Dalginross and Cargill.

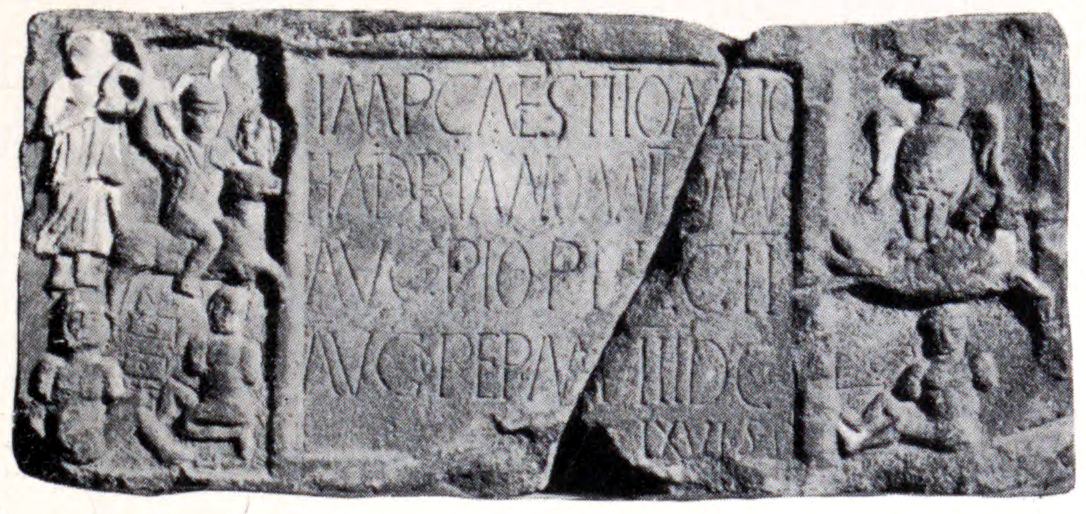
RIB 2193. Distance Slab of the Second Legion. George MacDonald calls it no. 6 in the 2nd edition of his book The Roman Wall in Scotland. He says it was found near the farm at Summerston on the banks of the Kelvin. It has been scanned and a video produced.

Recent research by Glasgow University has shown that the distance stones, stone sculptures unique to the Antonine Wall which were embedded in the wall to mark the lengths built by each legion, were brightly painted unlike their present bare appearance. These stones are preserved in the university's museum and are said to be the best-preserved examples of statuary from any Roman frontier. Several of the slabs have been analysed by various techniques including portable X-ray fluorescence (pXRF). Tiny remnants of paint have been detected by surface-enhanced Raman spectroscopy (SERS). Several of the distance slabs have been scanned and 3D videos produced. There are plans to reproduce the slabs, both digitally and in real physical copies, with their authentic colours. A copy of the Bridgeness Slab has already been made and can be found in Bo'ness. It is also expected that lottery funding will allow replicas of distance markers to be placed along the length of the wall.

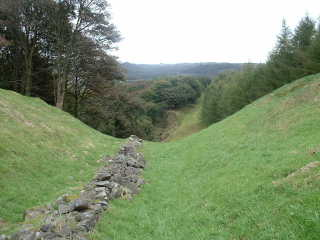
The Antonine Wall, looking east, from Bar Hill between Twechar and Croy

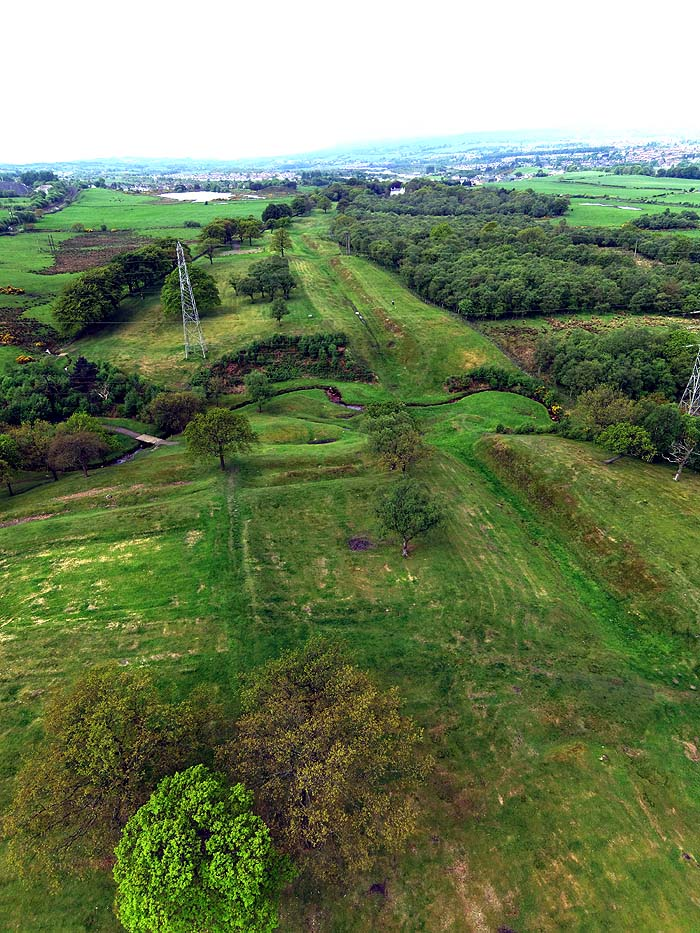
Looking westwards over the site of Rough Castle Roman fort along the Antonine Wall

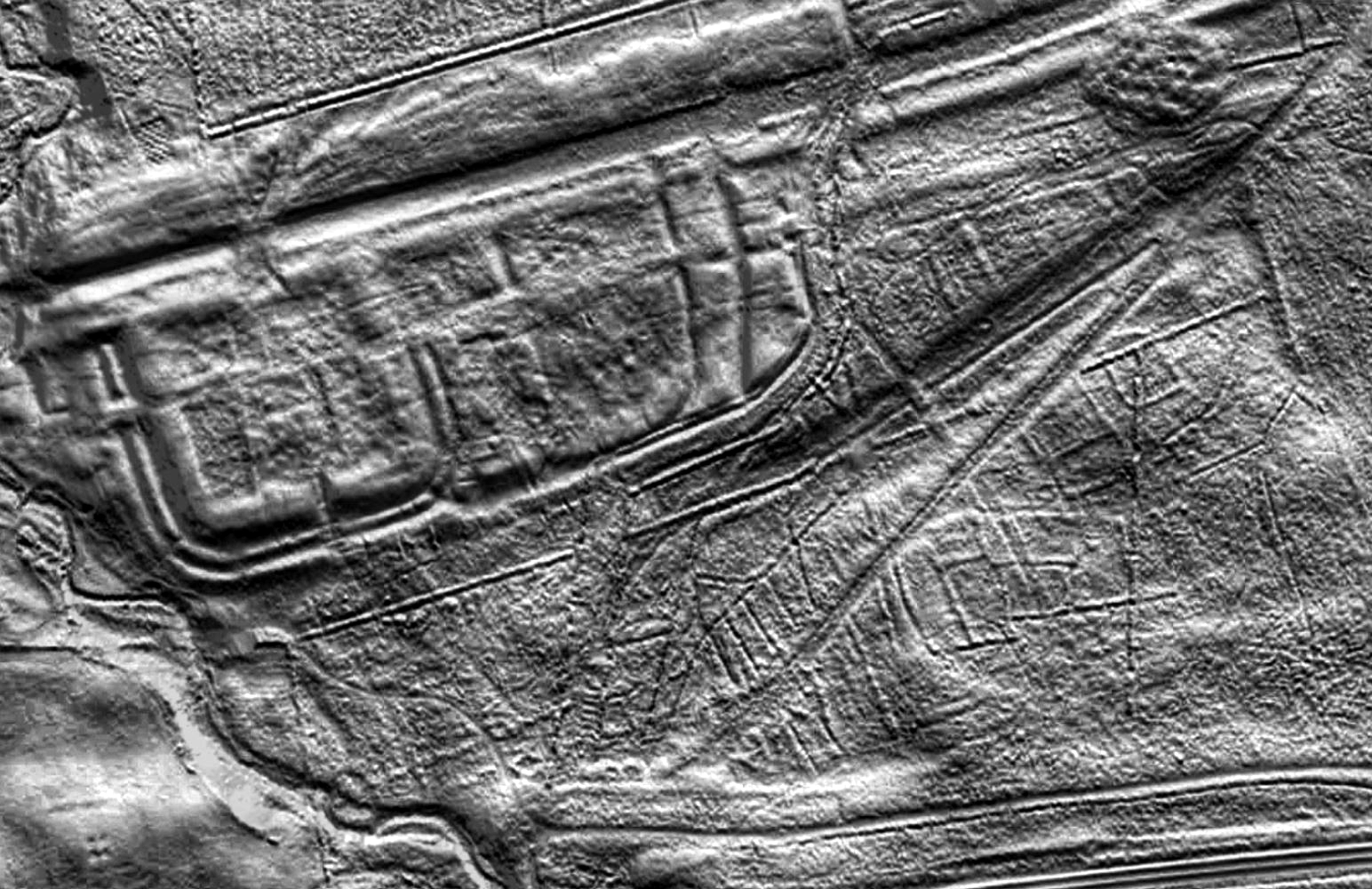
A lidar view of Rough Castle on the Antonine Wall

== Abandonment ==
The wall was abandoned within two decades of completion when the Roman legions withdrew to Hadrian's Wall in 162, and over time may have reached an accommodation with the Brythonic tribes of the area, whom they may have fostered as possible buffer states which would later become "The Old North". After a series of attacks in 197, the emperor Septimius Severus arrived in Scotland in 208, and campaigned against the Maeatae (based in the central Midland Valley on either side of the Firth of Clyde – Firth of Forth line) and the Caledonians to their north. While he carried out substantial work on Hadrian's Wall at the time, there is no evidence of any attention being paid to the remains of the Antonine Wall during the campaigns of 208–210. References in Late Roman sources to Severus' wall-building activities led to later scholars like Bede mistaking references to the Antonine Wall for ones to Hadrian's Wall.

== Post-Roman history ==
In the centuries that the Antonine Wall has lain abandoned, it has influenced culture between the Forth and the Clyde.

=== Gildas and Bede ===
Writing in 730, Bede, following Gildas in his De Excidio et Conquestu Britanniae, mistakenly ascribes the construction of the Antonine Wall to the Britons in his Historia Ecclesiastica 1.12:

The islanders built the wall which they had been told to raise, not of stone, since they had no workmen capable of such a work, but of sods, which made it of no use. Nevertheless, they carried it for many miles between the two bays or inlets of the sea of which we have spoken; to the end that where the protection of the water was wanting, they might use the rampart to defend their borders from the irruptions of the enemies. Of the work there erected, that is, of a rampart of great breadth and height, there are evident remains to be seen at this day. It begins at about two miles' distance from the monastery of Aebbercurnig [Abercorn], west of it, at a place called in the Pictish language Peanfahel, but in the English tongue, Penneltun [Kinneil], and running westward, ends near the city of Aicluith [Dumbarton].

Bede associated Gildas's turf wall with the Antonine Wall. As for Hadrian's Wall, Bede again follows Gildas:

[the departing Romans] thinking that it might be some help to the allies [Britons], whom they were forced to abandon, constructed a strong stone wall from sea to sea, in a straight line between the towns that had been there built for fear of the enemy, where Severus also had formerly built a rampart.

Bede obviously identified Gildas's stone wall as Hadrian's Wall, but he sets its construction in the 5th century rather than the 120s, and does not mention Hadrian. And he would appear to have believed that the ditch-and-mound barrier known as the Vallum (just to the south of, and contemporary with, Hadrian's Wall) was the rampart constructed by Severus. Many centuries would pass before just who built what became apparent.

=== Grim's Dyke ===
In medieval histories, such as the chronicles of John of Fordun, the wall is called Gryme's dyke. Fordun says that the name came from the grandfather of the imaginary king Eugenius son of Farquahar. This evolved over time into Graham's dyke – a name still found in Bo'ness at the wall's eastern end – and then linked with Clan Graham. Of note is that Graeme in some parts of Scotland is a nickname for the devil, and Gryme's Dyke would thus be the Devil's Dyke, mirroring the name of the Roman limes in Southern Germany often called 'Teufelsmauer'. Grímr and Grim are bynames for Odin or Wodan, who might be credited with the wish to build earthworks in unreasonably short periods of time. This name is the same one found as Grim's Ditch several times in England in connection with early ramparts: for example, near Wallingford, Oxfordshire or between Berkhamsted (Herts) and Bradenham (Bucks).

Other names used by antiquarians include the Wall of Pius and the Antonine Vallum, after Antoninus Pius. Edmund Spenser in Book II of The Faerie Queene (1590) alludes to the Wall, misattributing it to Constantine II. Hector Boece in his 1527 History of Scotland called it the "wall of Abercorn", repeating the story that it had been destroyed by Graham.

=== Scottish renaissance ===
Renaissance patrons in the 16th century, including George Keith, 5th Earl Marischal, who were exposed to the world of international scholarship through diplomacy, began to collect antiquities. The Earl Marischal set a stone from the Antonine Wall in the walls of Dunnotar Castle and had it painted and gilded, probably by Andrew Melville of Stonehaven. The stone is now at the Hunterian Museum in Glasgow and residual paint traces probably remaining from its later reuse have been analysed.

=== World Heritage status ===
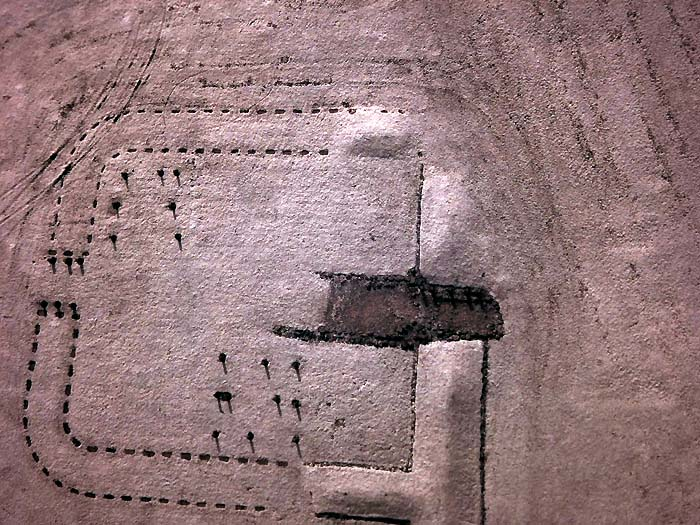
An infrared aerial photograph of Kinneil Roman Fortlet, near Bo'ness at the eastern end of the Antonine Wall

The UK government's nomination of the Antonine Wall for World Heritage status to the international conservation body UNESCO was first officially announced in 2003. It has been backed by the Scottish Government since 2005 and by Scotland's then Culture Minister Patricia Ferguson since 2006. It became the UK's official nomination in late January 2007, and MSPs were called to support the bid anew in May 2007. The Antonine Wall was listed as an extension to the World Heritage Site "Frontiers of the Roman Empire" on 7 July 2008. Though the Antonine Wall is mentioned in the text, it does not appear on UNESCO's map of world heritage properties.

=== Modern preservation ===
Several individual sites along the line of the wall are in the care of Historic Environment Scotland. These are at:

- Bar Hill Fort
- Bearsden Bath House
- Castlecary
- Croy Hill
- Dullatur
- Rough Castle
- Seabegs Wood
- Watling Lodge
- Westerwood, Cumbernauld

All sites are unmanned and open at all reasonable times.

== Mapping the wall ==
The first capable effort to systematically map the Antonine Wall was undertaken in 1764 by William Roy, the forerunner of the Ordnance Survey. He provided accurate and detailed drawings of its remains, and where the wall has been destroyed by later development, his maps and drawings are now the only reliable record of it. In the 19th century, the Ordnance Survey showed the visible traces of the wall in some detail on its first- and second-edition maps at 25-inch and 6-inch scales, but no attempt was made then to undertake archaeological work.

Sir George Macdonald carried out systematic work on the wall that was published in 1911 and in an expanded second edition in 1934. His work provided the basis for a large-scale (25-inch) folio produced by the Ordnance Survey in 1931. The Ordnance Survey produced a revised folio in 1954–1957, and then carried out a new complete survey in 1979–80. They also published a smaller-scale map of the Wall, at 1:25,000 in 1969. Further mapping activity was carried out to support the nomination of the Wall as a World Heritage Site.

Modern computer techniques like using GIS and LIDAR can now map the wall in three dimensions, making it much easier to study, for example, how visible forts and fortlets were to those at their neighbouring stations along the wall.

Maps of the Wall
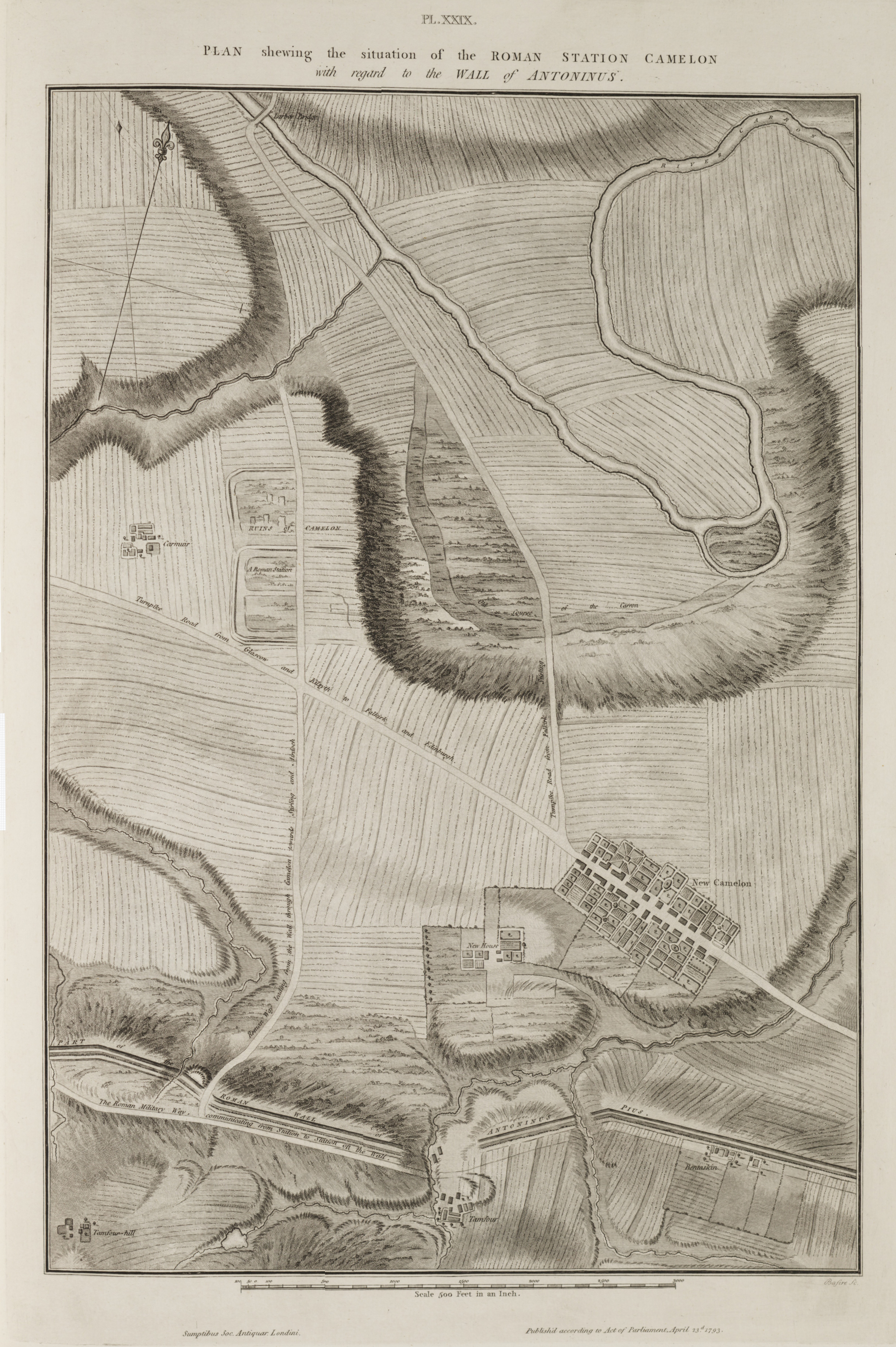
William Roy's plan of Camelon Roman Station and the adjacent section of the Wall, published 1793

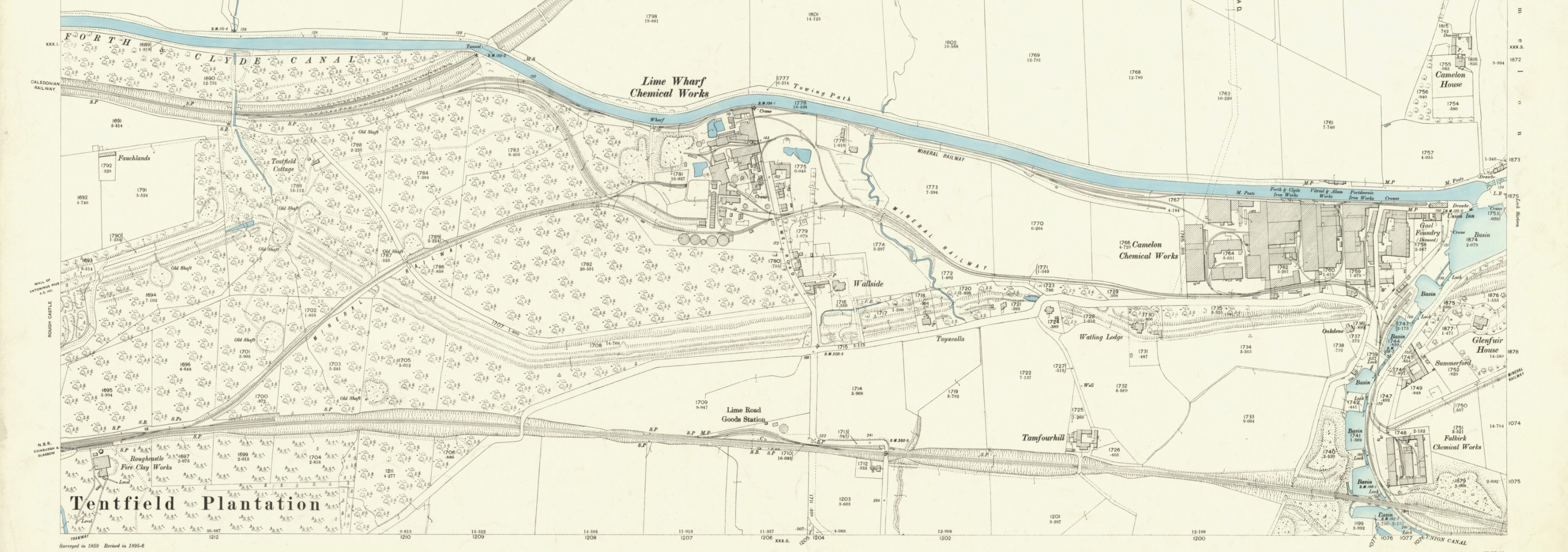
Part of the OS 25-inch map of 1897, showing a section of the Antonine Wall between Rough Castle and Camelon

Ordnance Survey Map of the Antonine Wall, published 1969

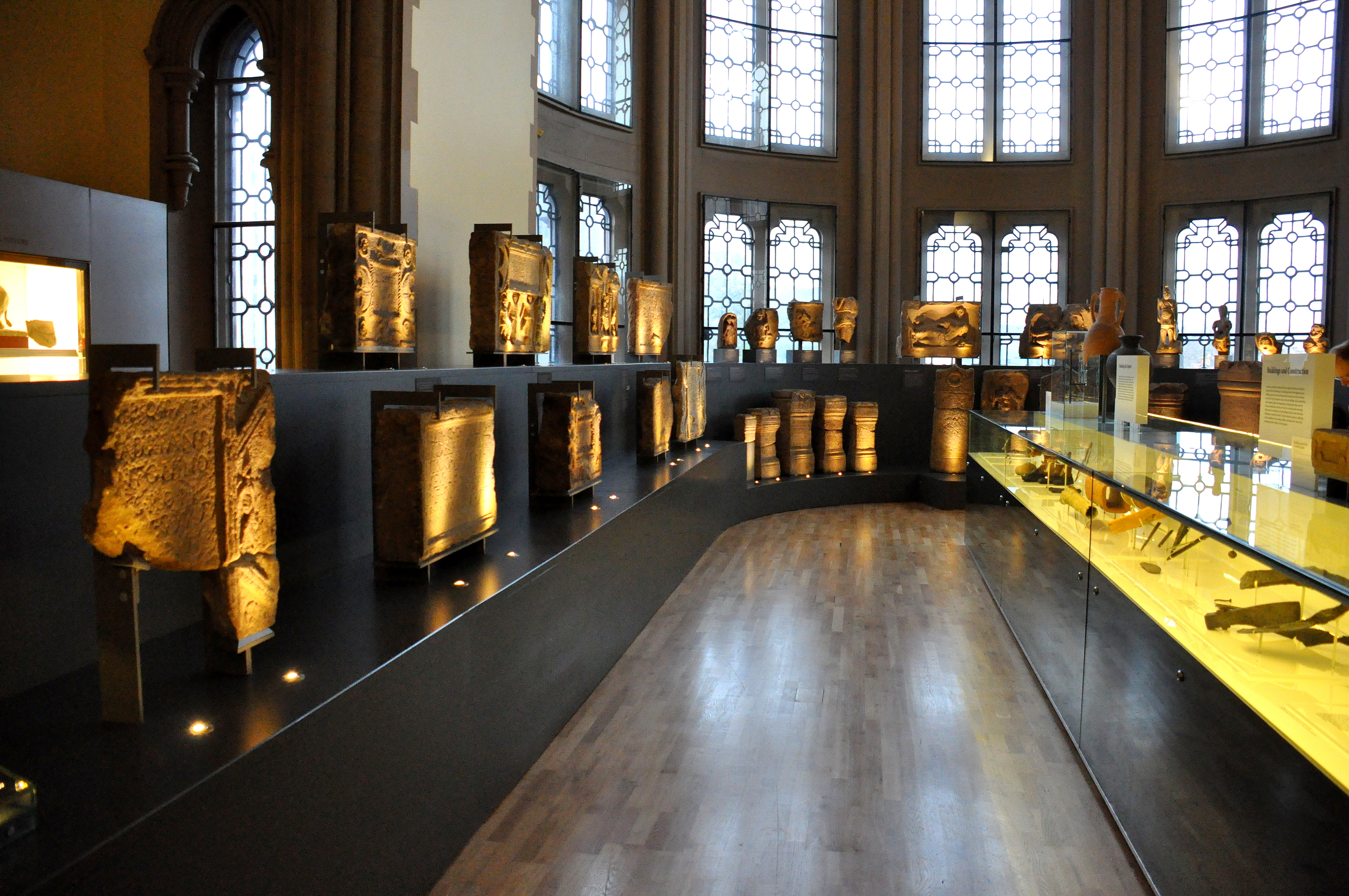
Finds from the Antonine Wall in the Hunterian Museum and Art Gallery in Glasgow

== See also ==
- Banknotes of Scotland (featured on design)
- Gask Ridge
- National Museums of Scotland
- Scotland during the Roman Empire
- The Bridgeness Slab
- Trimontium (Newstead)
- World Heritage Sites in Scotland
