= Menteith (disambiguation) =

Menteith is a district in Scotland.

Menteith can also refer to:

- Lake of Menteith, body of water in Scotland
- Earl of Menteith, Scottish title
- John de Menteith, who betrayed William Wallace to the English
