= Brian Dobson (archaeologist) =

English archaeologist (1931–2012)

Brian Dobson FSA
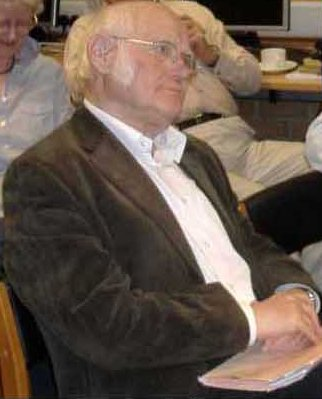
- Brian Dobson in 2011
- Born: 13 September 1931; Hartlepool, County Durham, England
- Died: 19 July 2012 (aged 80); Durham, England
- Citizenship: United Kingdom
- Education: Hatfield College, University of Durham
- Known for: Study and new interpretation of Hadrian's Wall Roman Epigraphy
- Scientific career
- Fields: History; Archaeology
- Workplaces: University of Durham
- Doctoral advisor: Eric Birley
- Notable students: David Breeze; Valerie Maxfield; Birgitta Hoffmann

Brian Dobson FSA (13 September 1931 – 19 July 2012) was an English archaeologist, teacher and scholar. His specialisms were Hadrian's Wall and the Roman Army. He studied under Eric Birley and is a member of the so-called 'Durham School' of archaeology. He was a Reader Emeritus of Durham University.

== Personal life ==
Dobson was born in Hartlepool in 1931 to a Plymouth Brethren family, attended school in Stockton before attending the University of Durham in 1949 to read Modern History as a member of Hatfield College. He fell under the influence of Eric Birley, who supervised his PhD on the role of primipilares in the Roman Army.

He was married for over 50 years and had five children.

== Education and work ==
From 1955 to 1957, he did his National Service in the British Army; he learnt Russian at Bodmin and Crail, and served in the Intelligence Corps. In 1957 to 1959, he worked at the University of Birmingham as research fellow, where he met and became influenced by the adult education tutor Graham Webster. In 1960, Dobson began working as a lecturer in archaeology in the Department of Extra Mural Studies, Durham University - a post in which he remained until retirement in 1990. In this capacity Dobson organised a series of tours of Hadrian's Wall sites every four years in the 1960s. During these he introduced his students (and others) to many little-known (to the amateur) sites on the wall. He worked closely with David Breeze (chief inspector of ancient monuments for historic Scotland and visiting professor at Durham University since 1994) on their joint studies in aspects of Hadrian's Wall and produced one of the most influential texts on the subject, still in print today. He undertook a series of excavations in Corbridge in the 1960s and 1970s, and provided an eyewitness account of the discovery of the Corbridge Hoard. In 1980, Durham appointed him Reader in Archaeology.

Dobson served as president of the Society of Antiquaries of Newcastle and of the Architectural and Archaeological Society of Durham and Northumberland. He was also a member of several local trusts, including those of Chesters, Corbridge and Maryport museums. What gave him particular pleasure was his membership of the Vindolanda Trust from 1996 to 2011.

== Hadrianic Society ==
In 1971, he founded the Hadrianic Society in order to promote the study of Hadrian's Wall and its environs. He remained the patron of the society from its conception until his death in 2012. To mark his 70th birthday, in 2002, the society presented him with a collation of papers from current and former students and colleagues. In 2017 the society published a Gedenkschrift in celebration of Dobson's career.

== Publications ==
- Birley, E., Dobson, B. and Jarret, M.G. (Eds.) 1994. Proceedings of the eighth International Congress of Limesforschung Cardiff: University of Wales Press
- Breeze, D. and Dobson, B. 1993. Roman Officers and Frontiers. Stuttgart : Franz Steiner Verlag
- Breeze, D. and Dobson, B. 2000. Hadrian's Wall Penguin
- Dobson, B. 1957. Die Rangordnung des römischen Heeres. Köln: Böhlau
- Dobson, B. and Maxfield, V. 1995. Inscriptions of Roman Britain. London: London Association of Classical Teachers

== See also ==
- Eric Birley
- David Breeze
