= Iain MacIvor =

British archaeologist and civil servant

Iain MacIvor ISO (6 May 1928 – 17 February 2017) was a British archaeologist and civil servant. He was Chief Inspector of Ancient Monuments for Scotland from 1980 to 1989.

== Biography ==
Born in Carlisle, MacIvor began reading for an English degree at Durham University in 1949, and was inspired by Eric Birley to begin participating in archaeological excavations at the Temple of Mithras at Carrawburgh on Hadrian's Wall. After graduation he continued his studies at Oxford under C. E. Stevens.

In 1955 he was appointed as assistant inspector of ancient monuments in the Edinburgh office of what was then the Ministry of Public Building and Works, eventually rising to full inspector, Principal Inspector and finally Chief Inspector before retiring in 1989. He received the Imperial Service Order the same year. David Breeze, another former student of Eric Birley, succeeded to the vacated post. MacIvor's interests gradually progressed from the Roman to the medieval and later periods – his greatest professional interest was said to be military fortifications of the Jacobite era.

MacIvor was elected a Fellow of the Society of Antiquaries of London in 1966, but resigned his fellowship in 2005.

== Publications ==
=== Books ===
- MacIvor, Iain (1970). Fort George. HM Stationery Office. OCLC 696055.
- ——— (1972). Fortifications of Berwick-upon-Tweed. HM Stationery Office. OCLC 731812.
- Fawcett, Richard; MacIvor, Iain; Petersen, Bent (1980). Reynolds, Nicholas (ed.). Edinburgh Castle. HM Stationery Office. OCLC 9282110.
- ——— (2001). A Fortified Frontier: Defences of the Anglo-Scottish Border. Tempus Publishing. OCLC 49694358.

=== Articles ===
- Gillam, John P.; MacIvor, Iain; Birley, Eric (1954). "The Temple of Mithras at Rudchester". Archaeologia Aeliana. 5th series. 6: 176–219.
- MacIvor, Iain (1965). "The Elizabethan Fortifications of Berwick-upon-Tweed". The Antiquaries Journal. 45 (1): 64–96.
- ——— (1965). "The King's Chapel at Restalrig and St Triduana's Aisle: A Hexagonal Two-Storied Chapel of the Fifteenth Century". Proceedings of the Society of Antiquaries of Scotland. 96: 247–263.
- Dunbar, John; MacIvor, Iain (1965). "James's Fort, Stirling". Proceedings of the Society of Antiquaries of Scotland. 96: 361–363.
- ———; Thomas, M. Clare; Breeze, David (1981). "Excavations on the Antonine Wall Fort of Rough Castle, Stirlingshire, 1957–61". Proceedings of the Society of Antiquaries of Scotland. 110: 230–285.
- ———; Gallagher, Dennis; Laing, Lloyd (1999). "Excavations at Caerlaverock Castle, 1955–66". The Archaeological Journal. 156 (1): 143–245.
