= Ardoch, Perth and Kinross =

Coordinates: 56.278944°N 3.881576°W

Ardoch: Scottish Gaelic: Àrdach; Scots: Ardoch
- Location within Perth and Kinross
- OS grid reference: NN836112
- Council area: Perth and Kinross
- Lieutenancy area: Perth and Kinross
- Country: Scotland
- Sovereign state: United Kingdom
- Post town: DUNBLANE
- Postcode district: FK15
- Police: Scotland
- Fire: Scottish
- Ambulance: Scottish
- UK Parliament: Stirling and Strathallan
- Scottish Parliament: Perthshire South and Kinross-shire

Ardoch /ˈɑːr.dɒx/ is a community in Perth and Kinross in Scotland, the largest population of which is in the village of Braco, west-southwest of Perth.

== Geography ==
Over Ardoch and the Mill of Ardoch are the eponymous settlements which refer to the southwestern parts of the south slope of the towering hill of Coire Odhar, rising 230 metres above the mill and Braco Castle to 357 metres Above Ordnance Datum. It is surrounded by forest to the north and south and by the moorland hill of Cromlet (405 metres or 1,329 feet) to the west. To the south of Braco two headwaters rising in the lower highlands to the immediate north meet, at about 10 metres below and 500 metres south of the clustered village (and main settlement) of Braco which borders the streams. Three bridges are in Braco. The A9 road and village of Greenloaning are immediately south of the confluence which becomes thereafter the Allan Water (or River). The nearest town is Dunblane 6 miles (10 kilometres) southwest. Crieff is a little further to the north. Based on the 2001 census, it had a population of 1,082.

Black Hill Roman Camps are located in Ardoch, while Ardoch Roman Fort is nearby, just outside the village of Braco.
