= Strageath =

Coordinates: 56°20′30″N 3°47′02″W

Designations

Scheduled monument
- Official name: Strageath, Roman Fort
- Type: Roman: fort
- Designated: 1st July 1936
- Reference no.: SM1614

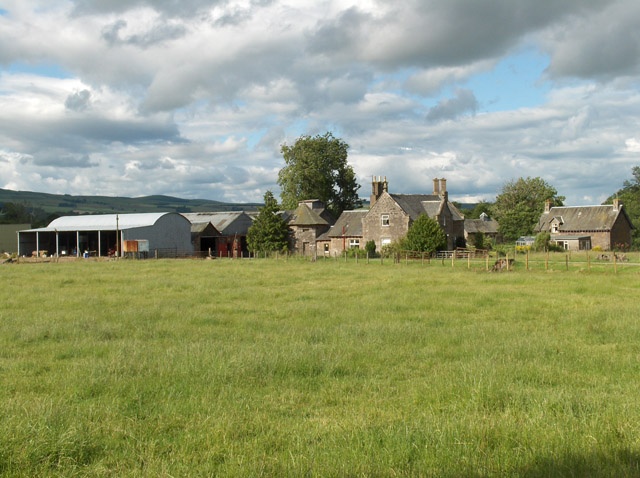
Strageath Mill

Strageath is the site of a Roman fort and

military camp near the River Earn in eastern Scotland. It is a scheduled monument.

== Roman history ==
In Roman Britain, Strageath was one of a chain of fortifications, known as the Gask Ridge that the Romans used in their march northward in the first/second century AD. Other notable camps in this chain are Ardoch, Bertha, Inchtuthill, Battledykes, Stracathro, Raedykes and Normandykes. The Strageath fort site has been studied on numerous occasions, most recently by the Roman Gask Project.

== Name ==
The name Strageath persists in the current day Strageath Mains, Strageath Mill and Strageath Hall. In the Middle Ages the parish church of Strogeath lay within the area of the fort. It was established by the Irish Bishop Fergus and dedicated to St. Patrick.

== Library ==
The Strageath site is very close to the Innerpeffray Library, the first lending library in Scotland. The Library's Heritage Trail leads down to the River Earn, where a ford crossing allowed Roman access to Strageath Fort. An Innerpeffray publication includes detailed maps and sketches of what these Roman sites might have looked like.
