= Bertha Park =

Area within the city of Perth, Scotland

Coordinates: 56.4231°N 3.4903°W

- Location within Perth and Kinross
- OS grid reference: NO0846726545
- Council area: Perth and Kinross
- Lieutenancy area: Perth and Kinross
- Country: Scotland
- Sovereign state: United Kingdom
- Post town: PERTH
- Postcode district: PH1
- Dialling code: 01738
- Police: Scotland
- Fire: Scottish
- Ambulance: Scottish
- UK Parliament: Perth and Kinross-shire
- Scottish Parliament: Perthshire South and Kinross-shire

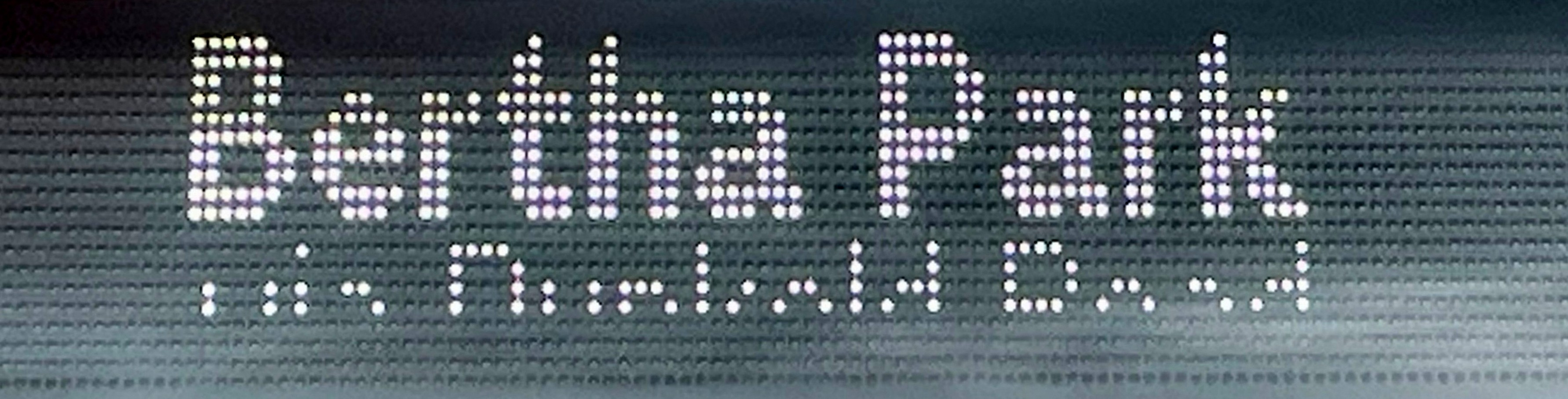
Bertha Park bus

Bertha Park is an area within the city of Perth, Scotland. It occupies a 333 hectares (820 acres) area of former farmland bounded by the River Almond to the south, and Bertha Loch to the north.

== Development ==
The development of the Bertha Park site is supported by Perth & Kinross Council's Local Development Plan (LDP). The development will be built out in three phases over 30 years to include more than 3,000 new homes and employment land encompassing various uses.

Phase 1 of this development has already created houses, shops and Bertha Park High School, which opened in 2019. Homes on the site are being built by the Springfield Group. The streets are named after notable figures born in Perth, including Adamson Avenue, Croll Gardens and Geddes Avenue.

== Name ==
The area takes its name from the nearby farm “Berthapark” to the east. The name Bertha refers to the site of a Roman fort nearby which uses an ancient form of the Perth city name.

== Schools ==
Bertha Park High School has a focus on digital learning and is the only school in the UK to be part of Microsoft's Flagship Schools program. Along with families in the new development, students from the following Primary Schools are entitled to attend Bertha Park High School:

Auchtergaven Primary, Methven Primary, Pitcairn Primary, Forgandenny Primary, Logiealmond Primary, Dunbarney Primary, Ruthvenfield Primary and Oudenarde/Bridge of Earn (currently placed at Inchview Primary).

Plans are in place for a Bertha Park Primary school, to be located beside the High School. Building work on the new primary school and nursery at Bertha Park is expected to start in November 2024 and be completed in June 2026.

== Roads ==
A new Bertha Park Link Road it is now open as of the 24th of June 2026 at 3pm. This road will connect to the Cross Tay Link Road and the A9 north of Perth, as well as the new Destiny Bridge across the Tay, which was opened on March 31, 2025. It is the third and second last phase of the £150 million Cross Tay Link Road (CTLR) project. The road will head north from the existing roundabout next to Bertha Park High School, going through housing in Bertha Park and on through areas of farmland and forestry before meeting the new A9 west roundabout.
