= David Breeze =

British archaeologist (born 1944)

David John Breeze
- Born: 25 July 1944 (age 82); England
- Citizenship: United Kingdom
- Education: Durham University
- Known for: Study and new interpretation of Hadrian's Wall and the Antonine Wall
- Scientific career
- Fields: History; Archaeology
- Workplaces: Durham University; Historic Scotland

David John Breeze, OBE, FSA, FRSE, HonFSAScot, Hon MIFA (born 25 July 1944) is a British archaeologist, teacher and scholar of Hadrian's Wall, the Antonine Wall and the Roman army. He studied under Eric Birley and is a member of the so-called "Durham School" of archaeology. He was a close friend and colleague of the late Dr Brian Dobson.

== Personal life ==
Breeze was educated in Blackpool Grammar School. He attended the University of Durham, from which he was awarded his Doctor of Philosophy degree (PhD) in 1970. His thesis was titled The immunes and principales of the Roman army.

== Education and work ==
After working for the department of archaeology at the University of Durham in 1968–1969, Breeze was appointed an Assistant Inspector of Ancient Monuments in the Ministry of Public Building and Works. He succeeded Iain MacIvor as Chief Inspector of Ancient Monuments for Historic Scotland in 1989, serving in this role until 2005.

He is an honorary professor at Durham University, the University of Edinburgh, Newcastle University and the University of Stirling.

He led the team which resulted in the Antonine Wall being ascribed as a World Heritage Site in 2008, and formed part of the group which created the Frontiers of the Roman Empire World Heritage Site, of which this is the first multi-national example. He chaired the Culture 2000 project Frontiers of the Roman Empire (2005–08). He edited, with Sonja Jilek, a multi-language series of books on the frontiers of the Roman Empire. Published so far are volumes on the Roman limes in Hungary (2008), the lower Danube limes in Bulgaria (2008), Slovakia (2008), The Danube Limes: A Roman River Frontier (2009), the Antonine Wall (2009), Hadrian's Wall (2011), the Danube limes in Austria (2011), North Africa (2013), Serbia (2017), The Lower German Limes (2019), Egypt (2021), Dacia (2021), Upper Germanic Limes (2022), The Eastern Frontier (2022), The Saxon Shore (2022), Wales (2022), The Hinterland of Hadrian's Wall (2023), Georgia (2024) and Raetia (2026) all available online. The report on his excavations at the Roman fort at Bearsden on the Antonine Wall was published in 2016, with a separate 'popular' account shortly afterwards.

== Affiliations and other activities ==
Breeze has served as president of the Society of Antiquaries of Scotland (1987–90), the Society of Antiquaries of Newcastle upon Tyne (2008–11), the Royal Archaeological Institute (2009–12) and the Cumberland and Westmorland Antiquarian and Archaeological Society (2011–14). He was Chairman of the British Archaeological Awards from 1993 to 2009 and of the International Congress of Roman Frontier Studies from 2000 to 2015, and the Senhouse Museum Trust, Maryport, from 2013 to 2018; he is now a patron of the trust. He was one of the founders of the Hadrianic Society in 1971, and is now a patron of its successor, the Roman Army School held in Durham each Easter. Breeze has chaired the organising committee for the 1989, 1999, 2009 and 2019 Pilgrimages of Hadrian's Wall, probably the oldest archaeological tour in the UK, and edited the 14th edition of the Handbook to the Roman Wall, the oldest archaeological guide-book in the UK to have been continuously in print and up-dated. He is a corresponding member of the German Archaeological Institute.

== Honours and awards ==
Breeze was awarded an Honorary Doctorate of Letters by the University of Glasgow in 2008. He was appointed Officer of the Order of the British Empire (OBE) in 2009.

He was awarded Current Archaeology's Archaeologist of the Year award at the Archaeology Awards 2009, and the European Archaeological Heritage Prize in 2010. Breeze was presented with a Festschrift in 2009: The Army and Frontiers of Rome edited by William S. Hanson and published by the Journal of Roman Archaeology.

In 2021, Breeze was awarded the Kenyon Medal by the British Academy "for his outstanding contribution to the archaeology of the Roman Empire and to ensuring the inscription of the Antonine Wall as a World Heritage Site".

== Publications ==
- Breeze, D. J. 1982, The Northern Frontiers of Roman Britain, London: Batsford.
- Breeze, D. J. 1983, 2nd ed. 2002, Roman Forts in Britain, Princes Risborough: Shire Publications.
- Breeze, D. J. 1987, 2nd ed. 2002, Hadrian's Wall, a souvenir guide to the Roman Wall, London: English Heritage.
- Breeze, D. J. 1987, A Queen's Progress, Edinburgh: Her Majesty's Stationery Office
- Breeze, D. J. 1996, second edition 2006, Roman Scotland: Frontier Country, London: Batsford.
- Breeze, D. J. 1998, Historic Scotland, 5000 Years of Scotland's Heritage, London: Batsford.
- Breeze, D. J. 2002, Historic Scotland: People and Places, London: Batsford.
- Breeze, D. J. 2006, John Collingwood Bruce's Handbook to the Roman Wall, 14th ed. Newcastle upon Tyne: Society of Antiquaries of Newcastle upon Tyne.
- Breeze, D. J. 2006, The Antonine Wall, Edinburgh: John Donald.
- Breeze, D. J. 2007, Roman Frontiers in Britain, London: Duckworth.
- Breeze, D. J. 2008, Edge of Empire, Scotland's Roman Frontier, The Antonine Wall, Edinburgh: Birlinn.
- Breeze, D. J. 2011, The Frontiers of Imperial Rome, Barnsley: Pen and Sword Books.
- Breeze, D. J. (ed) 2012, The First Souvenirs, Enamelled Vessels from Hadrian's Wall, Kendal: CWAAS.
- Breeze, D. J. (ed) 2013 200 years, The Society of Antiquaries of Newcastle upon Tyne 1813-2013, Newcastle: Society of Antiquaries of Newcastle.
- Breeze, D. J. (ed) 2014, The Impact of Rome on the British Countryside, London: Royal Archaeological Institute.
- Breeze, D. J. 2014, Hadrian's Wall: A History of Archaeological Thought, Kendal: CWAAS.
- Breeze, D. J. 2016, The Roman Army, London: Bloomsbury.
- Breeze, D. J. 2016, Bearsden: A Roman Fort on the Antonine Wall, Edinburgh: Society of Antiquaries of Scotland.
- Breeze, D. J. 2016, Hadrian's Wall: Paintings by the Richardson Family, Edinburgh: John Donald.
- Breeze, D. J. 2016, Bearsden. The Story of a Roman Fort, Oxford: Archaeopress.
- Breeze, D. J. 2018, Maryport. A Roman Fort and its Community, Oxford: Archaeopress.
- Breeze, D. J. 2018, The Crosby Garrett Helmet, Kendal: CWAAS.
- Breeze, D. J. 2019, Hadrian's Wall. A Study in Archaeological Exploration and interpretation, Oxford: Archaeopress.
- Breeze, D. J. with Mark Richards and Peter Savin 2019, Hadrian's Wall. A Journey Through Time, Carlisle: Bookcase.
- Breeze, D. J. 2020, The Pilgrimages of Hadrian's Wall, 1849-2019: A History, Kendal: Cumberland and Westmorland Antiquarian and Archaeological Society and Society of Antiquaries of Newcastle.
- Breeze, D. J. 2023, Hadrian's Wall in our Time, Oxford: Archaeopress.
- Breeze, D. J. 2024, Hadrian's Wall and its Trees, Oxford: Archaeopress.
- Breeze, D. J. and Dobson, B. 1993, Roman Officers and Frontiers, Stuttgart: Franz Steiner.
- Breeze, D. J. and Dobson, B. 1st ed. 1976, 4th ed. 2000, Hadrian's Wall, London: Penguin.
- Breeze, D. J. and Jilek, S. (eds) 2008, Frontiers of the Roman Empire: The European Dimension of a World Heritage Site, Edinburgh: Historic Scotland.
- Breeze, D. J., Jones, R. H. and Oltean, I. A. (eds) 2015, Understanding Roman Frontiers, Celebrating Professor Bill Hanson, Edinburgh: John Donald.
- Breeze, D. J. and Munro, G. 1997, The Stone of Destiny, Symbol of Nationhood, Edinburgh: Historic Scotland.
- Breeze, D. J. and Thiel, A. 2005, The challenge of presentation. Visible and invisible parts of the Frontiers of the Roman Empire World Heritage Site in the United Kingdom and Germany, Amsterdam: Stichting voor de Nederlandse Archeologie.
- Breeze, D. J., Thoms, L. M. and Hall, D. W (eds) 2009, First Contact, Rome and Northern Britain, Perth: Tayside and Fife Archaeological Committee.
- Breeze, D. J., Welander, R. and Clancy, T. O (eds) 2003, The Stone of Destiny, artefact and icon, Edinburgh: Society of Antiquaries of Scotland.
- Breeze, D. J. and Woolliscroft, D. J. (eds) 2009, Excavation and Survey at Roman Burgh-by-Sands, Kendal: CWAAS.
- Breeze, D. J. and Hanson, W. S., (eds) 2020, The Antonine Wall. Papers in Honour of Professor Lawrence Keppie, Oxford: Archaeopress.
- Breeze, D. J., Ivleva, T., Jones, R. H. and Thiel, A., 2022. A History of the Congress of Roman Frontier Studies 1949-2022, Oxford: Archaeopress.
