= Inverquharity =

Roman fortlet in Angus, Scotland

Coordinates: 56°42′34″N 2°57′47″W

Designations

Scheduled monument
- Official name: Inverquharity, Roman fort, Roman camp and Iron Age settlement
- Type: 20th Century Military and Related: Fort, Prehistoric domestic and defensive: souterrain, earth-house, Roman: camp
- Designated: 27 September 1996
- Reference no.: SM6452

Inverquharity is a Roman fortlet in Scotland, close to the Highland Line about 5 miles (8 km) north of Kirriemuir, Angus.

Although very little archaeological work has taken place, it is assumed that Inverquharity forms part of the Roman occupation during the Flavian period; this would mean it was constructed sometime between 70 and 86 CE. It would thus form part of the series of Strathmore forts, which include Inchtuthil, Cargill I and II, Cardean and Stracathro. Inverquharity is, with Cargill II, one of the smaller installations. Its position close to the Highland line and in a mouth of a small valley, justifies its inclusion amongst the Glenblocker forts.

Aerial photography and geophysical study have shown Inverquharity to have two ditches, of which at least one has been eroded or the sand cliff on which it is situated. Nothing is known about its internal structures.
