= Maisières =

Sub-municipality of the city of Mons, Belgium

Maisières Maîsiéres (Walloon)
- Sub-municipality of Mons
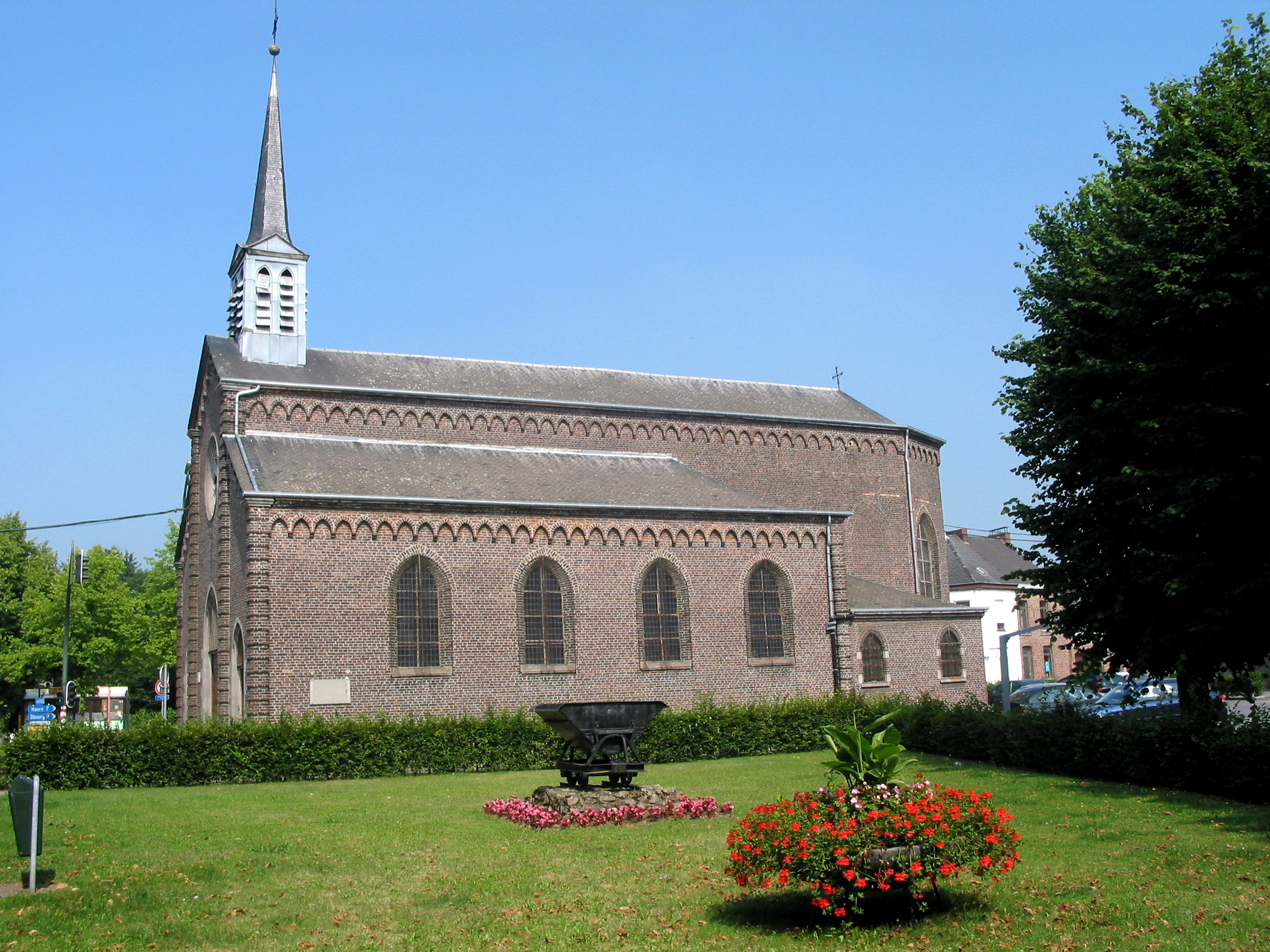
- St. Martin Church

- Coat of arms

- Location of Maisières in Mons
- Interactive map of Maisières
- Location within Belgium Location within Hainaut (Belgium)
- Coordinates: 50°29′25″N 3°57′46″E
- Country: Belgium
- Community: French Community
- Region: Wallonia
- Province: Hainaut
- Arrondissement: Mons
- Municipality: Mons

Area
  - Total: 6.03 km^{2} (2.33 sq mi)

Population (2020-01-01)
  - Total: 4,157
  - Density: 689/km^{2} (1,790/sq mi)
- Postal codes: 7020
- Area codes: 065

Maisières (French pronunciation: [mɛzjɛʁ]; Walloon: Maîsiéres) is a sub-municipality of the city of Mons located in the province of Hainaut, Wallonia, Belgium. It was a separate municipality until 1977. On 1 January 1977, it was merged into Mons.

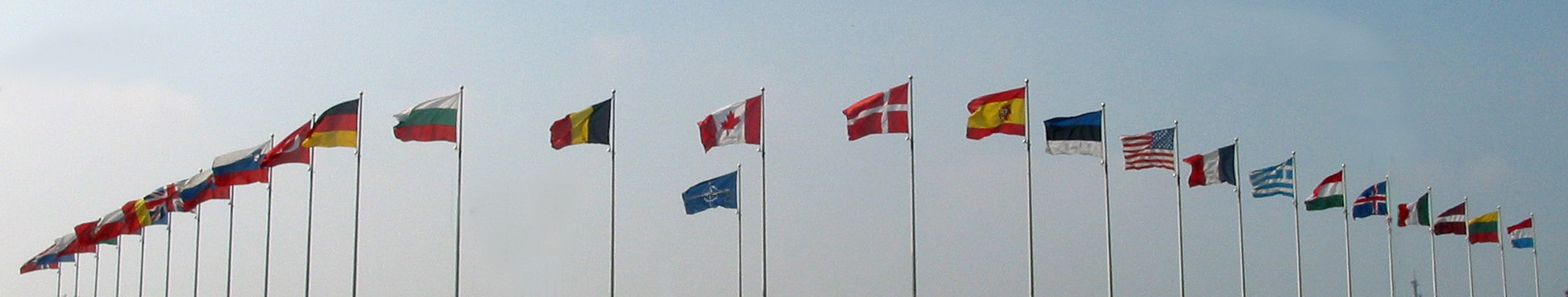
Flags of the NATO countries in front of SHAPE (Maisières, Belgium, 2006).
