= Bertha (Perth) =

Roman fort in Scotland

Coordinates: 56.4248°N 3.4647°W

Designations

Scheduled monument
- Official name: Bertha, Roman Fort
- Type: Roman: fort
- Designated: 17 March 1964
- Reference no.: SM2403

Bertha is the name of the site of a Roman fort north of the city of modern Perth, Scotland, at the confluence of the rivers Almond and Tay. It is 0.5 miles (0.80 km) east of the modern farm of "Berthapark" and is a scheduled monument.

== Name ==
The name "Bertha" was originally used by medieval Scots historians, such as John of Fordun and Walter Bower, who did not know the original name for the site and who adapted a version of Perth – "Berth". According to the 2nd century AD geographer Ptolemy, the Romans may have called the site Tamia (or possibly Tavus), after a native name for the River Tay. In early medieval times the abandoned site was still used for ceremonial purposes by Pictish and Gaelic kings, when it was called "Rathinveramon".

== Roman history ==
The fort was a supply base built around AD 83 to support the occasional Roman expeditions into north-east Scotland. At that time, it was at the highest navigable point on the Tay. It was one of the sites in the series of Roman fortifications known as the Gask Ridge. It is possible that the site was re-used on three occasions up to the 3rd century.

The 9-acre (36,000 m^{2}) site was identified in the 18th century. It has been damaged by river erosion and by ploughing, but excavations in 1973 revealed a ditch 11 feet (3.4 m) wide and 5.5 feet (1.7 m) deep. Immediately within the ditch was a wide berm over 30 feet (9.1 m) wide and this was backed by a turf rampart averaging about 21 feet (6.4 m) wide. Further field studies were reported in 2006 as part of the Roman Gask Project.

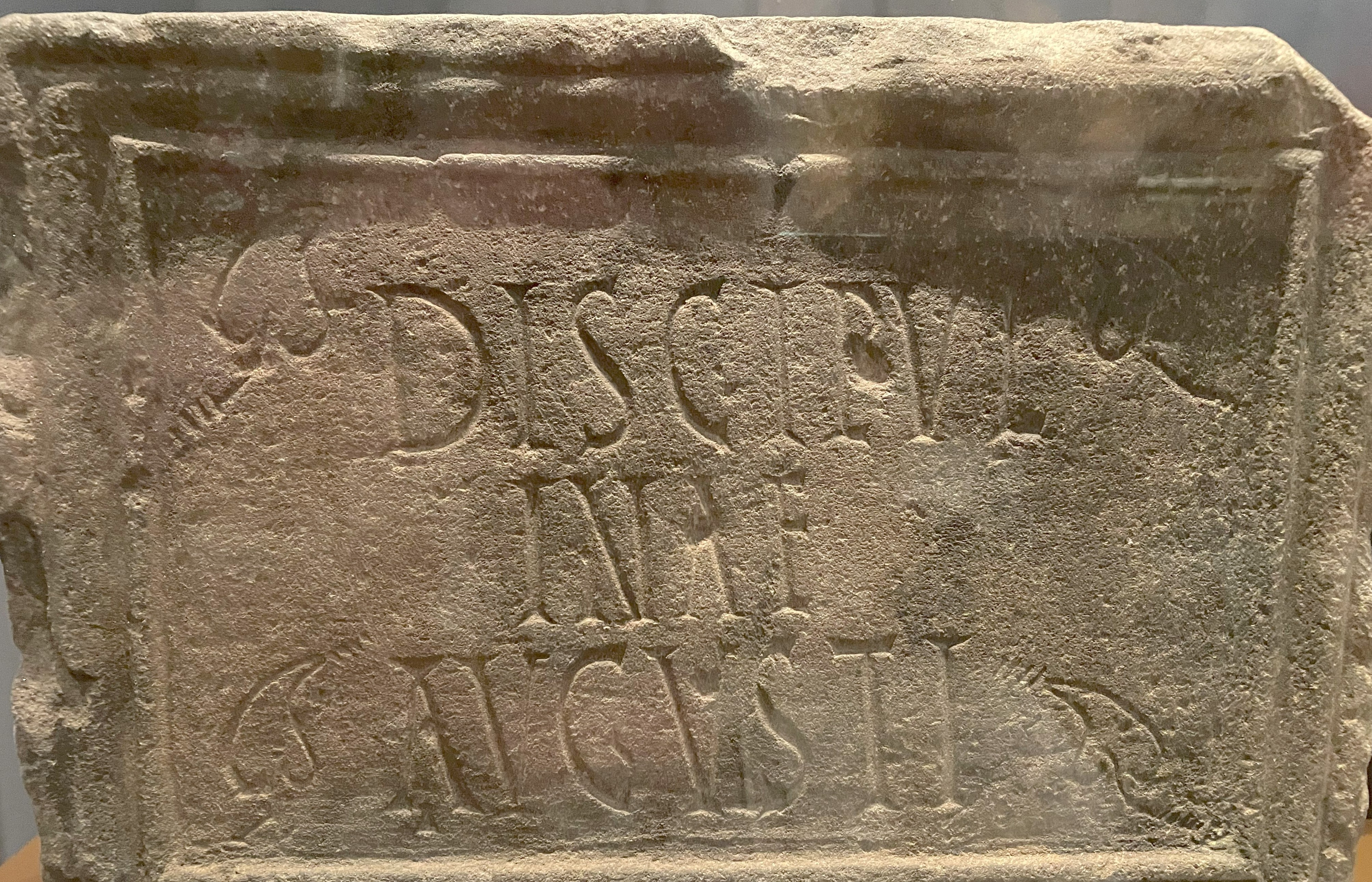
Roman Altar Stone found near Bertha in 1958

A Roman Altar Stone, inscribed DISCIPVLINA AVGUSTI 'To the discipline of the emperor' was found at the Bertha site near the River Almond in 1958. The cult of military discipline was strongly favored by Hadrian and other emperors from the 2nd century AD onwards. As of June 2025, the stone is on display in the Perth Museum.

Bertha Park, a mixed-use area to the north of Perth's city centre, preserves the name.
