= Ardoch Roman Fort =

Archaeological site in Scotland

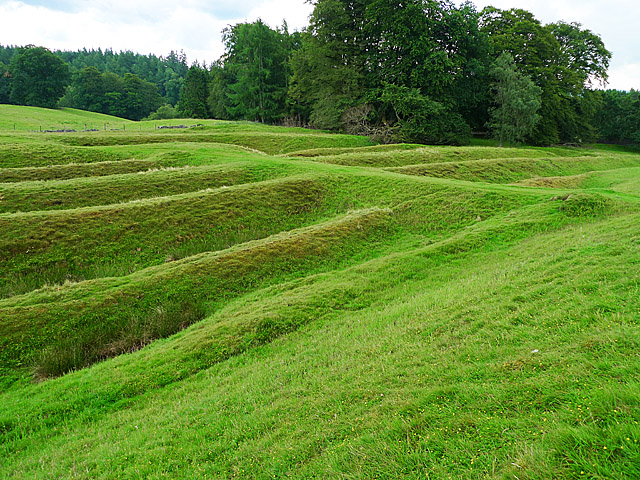
- Entranceway to the fort

- Location within Perth and Kinross
- 56.2678°N 3.8753°W
- Location: Braco, Perth and Kinross, Scotland

Ardoch Roman Fort is an archaeological site just outside the village of Braco in Perthshire, Scotland, about seven miles (eleven kilometres) south of Crieff.

At Ardoch are the remains of a Roman fort and several marching camps which included a signal tower. Part of the Roman Gask Ridge, it is said to be one of the most complete Roman camps in Britain, and is one of the best-preserved series of Roman military earthworks in the whole Empire. It is protected as a scheduled monument.

== Description ==
The remains consist of grass-covered earthworks, and are considered among the best preserved Roman earthworks in Britain. The site, which has a complex history, comprises two intersecting forts. The earliest fort is believed to be associated with the campaigns of Agricola (1st century). The later fort was apparently reconstructed within two outer ditches so that this later fort was protected by five ditches on both the east and north sides.

The field to the north is the remnant of a large annexe. Archaeology has demonstrated the existence of a watch-tower (or signal tower) and at least six overlapping marching camps to the north and northeast.

Ardoch was one of a chain of camps separated by one-day marches in a generally north–south direction. Other Roman camps in this chain include Strageath, Inchtuthil, Battledykes, Stracathro, Raedykes and thence taking the Elsick Mounth trackway to Normandykes.

== Name ==
The fort has sometimes been identified with the "Alauna" mentioned in Ptolemy's Geography. Ptolemy placed Alauna in the area occupied by the Damnonii tribe, and the name may be associated with the River Allan which flows about one mile (1.5 kilometres) to the south of the fort. However the identification of Ardoch with Alauna is considered tentative.

== Later history ==
The site was reused in the medieval period when a chapel was built near the centre of the fort. The remains of the graveyard enclosure and the site of the chapel are the only archaeological remains which are visible within the fort.

A hoard of Roman silver coins was found four miles (six kilometres) north of Ardoch in 1671. At that time, Lord Drummond wrote that the ditches were deep enough to hide a man on horseback. Other trenches to the northeast had been damaged by cultivation against his grandfather's orders.

In 1726 Alexander Gordon claimed that at Ardoch Roman Fort a subterranean passage was said to run from the fort, under the River Tay to the fort or 'Keir' on Grinnin Hill. This tunnel was said to contain a great deal of treasure.

Ardoch was visited by Queen Victoria and Prince Albert in 1842, although only Albert investigated the earthworks, Victoria preferred to remain in their carriage.

== Ownership and access ==
Ardoch Roman Fort is part of the Ardoch estate, and is in private ownership, although access is allowed at reasonable times. To the north, the earthwork remains of two Roman marching camps, known as Black Hill Roman Camps, are in the care of Historic Environment Scotland.

== See also ==
Whitley Castle in Northumberland, also known as Epiacum, is a Roman fort that also retains a remarkable series of ditches and ramparts. It is structured in an unusual 'lozenge' shape.
