= Battledykes =

Roman Camp established slightly to the north of Forfar, Scotland

Coordinates: 56°41′29″N 2°53′01″W

Designations

Scheduled monument
- Official name: Battledykes, Roman camp
- Type: Prehistoric domestic and defensive: enclosure (domestic or defensive, rather than ritual or funerary); hut circle, roundhouse; souterrain, earth-house, Roman: camp
- Designated: 17 June 1963
- Reference no.: SM2308

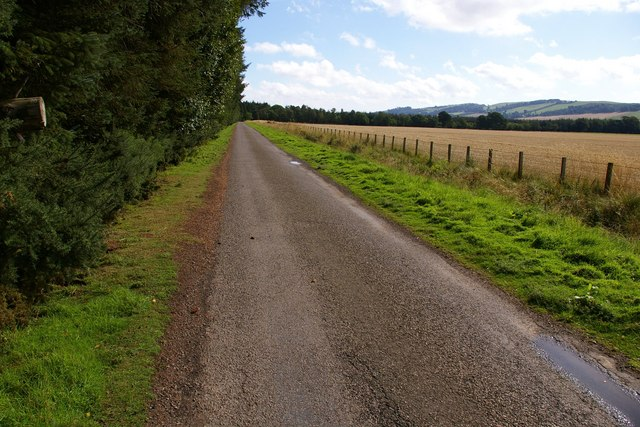
Approximate site of the Roman camp at Battledykes

Battledykes is a Roman camp slightly to the north of Forfar, Scotland. According to Hector Boece, Pictish chiefs met at a castle by Forfar Loch to plan how to repel the Roman armies, who invaded several times between the 1st and 4th centuries AD. Eventually, the better equipped Romans prevailed, later to be displaced again by the Picts. The Romans established a Roman Camp at Battledykes, approximately three miles north of Forfar; this camp was assessed to have held 50,000 to 60,000 men. From Battledykes northward the Romans established a succession of camps including Stracathro, Raedykes and Normandykes.
