= Inchtuthil =

Roman fortress

- Perth and Kinross, Scotland, UK
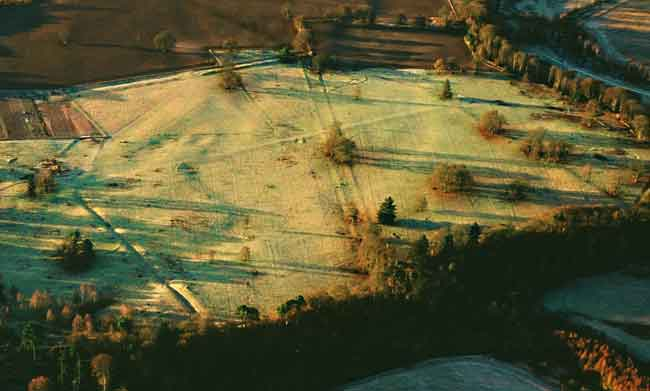
- Aerial photograph of the fort site

Location
- Location in Perth and Kinross
- Coordinates: 56.541°N 3.424°W
- Grid reference: NO1239

Inchtuthil is the site of a Roman legionary fortress situated on a natural platform overlooking the north bank of the River Tay southwest of Blairgowrie, Perth and Kinross, Scotland (Roman Caledonia).

It was built in AD 82 or 83 as the advance headquarters for the forces of governor Gnaeus Julius Agricola in his campaign against the Caledonian tribes. Positioned at the head of one of the main routes in and out of the Scottish Highlands, it was occupied by Legion XX Valeria Victrix and covered a total area of 21.5 hectares (53 acres).

Construction of the large fortress would have taken two or three seasons and a temporary camp was built nearby to house and protect the soldiers over the winter. Additional, smaller forts were built further north and south at the mouth of each nearby glen forming what are now referred to as the Glenblocker forts.

The fort at Inchtuthil is thought to be part of the Glenblocker forts, as well as others in Strathmore, such as Cardean and Stracathro, formed a uniform system composed of several elements, the forts and watchtowers on the Roman road of the Gask Ridge, the Glenblockers and the Strathmore forts. Inchtuthil as the largest military base would have functioned as the lynch-pin and the only site large enough to launch an invasion into the Highlands and beyond.

== Layout and garrison ==
Unlike other legionary fortresses in Britain, Inchtuthil was not later built over and its layout was still largely preserved when Sir Ian Richmond excavated it between 1952 and 1965. It is therefore notable as the site which provides the only complete plan of a legionary fortress anywhere in the Roman empire. Its defences consisted of a turf rampart faced with stone, with an outside ditch and gatehouses on each side, following the standard Roman plan. The legion it accommodated would have numbered 5,400 at full strength, though there would have been additional specialist troops accompanying them.

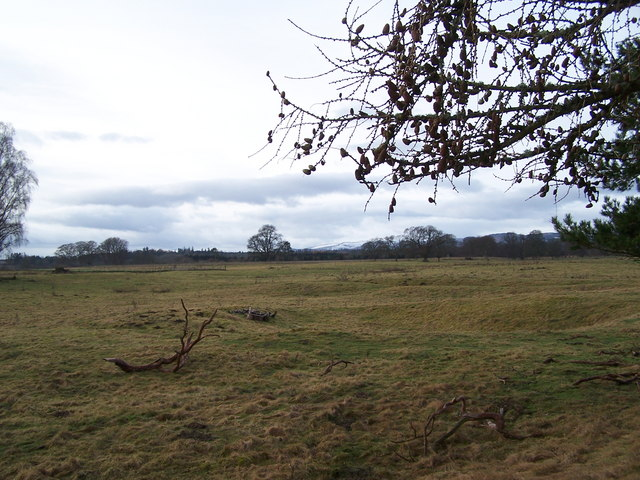
View from the ground

Facilities included a hospital (valetudinarium) that covered 5,000 square metres (54,000 sq ft), a workshop covering 3,500 square metres (38,000 sq ft), and 64 barrack buildings. The timber walls of these buildings have been calculated to have had a total perimeter of 7 miles (11 km). A headquarters building containing an aedes where the legion's colours and images of the emperor would have been kept has also been identified in the insula in the centre of the fortress. However, it was much smaller than would be expected for a legionary fortress, and must have been of a temporary nature. The large empty insula to its east should have been the site for the Praetorium, the commander's house. However, no signs of building foundations for such a large structure were found though the site had been levelled and prepared.

Inchtuthil was only briefly occupied and was evacuated around summer AD 86 and certainly no later than early in AD 87. The reason for this was probably that Legio II Adiutrix had been called to Moesia from its base in Deva Victrix (Chester) to deal with a Dacian invasion in 86 and XX Valeria Victrix was obliged to move back south to take its place. However recent archaeology has cast some doubt on this, indicating that the fortress may have been in use for considerably longer than previously thought.

== Nail hoard ==
During the excavations started by Richmond in the 1950s, a large pit was found in the summer of 1960 containing 875,400 complete iron nails (Square shaft) ranging from 50–410 mm (2–16 in) plus another 28 (round shaft nails) weighing 7 short tons (6.4 t), together with other iron objects, including cartwheel rims weighing a combined total weight of ten tonnes. The nails and ironwork were found in a pit which was elaborately concealed. They were almost certainly buried by the Roman troops when they dismantled the fortress before departure to deny to the local tribes both the nails and a large quantity of refined iron within them that could be used to forge weapons.

Many of the nails were sent to museums. Some of the hoard was sold to the public and other interested organisations, with an offer of 5 shillings for a 180–250 mm (7–10 in) nail and 25 shillings for a boxed set of five nails. David Colville & Sons (Iron and Steel refiners) was given the task of sorting and storing the nails; the process of sorting, gifting or selling all complete nails was completed by 1963, three years after their discovery.

The almost 2000-year-old iron nails from Inchtuthil have been used by atomic scientists to estimate the corrosion effects on barrels of nuclear waste.
