= Stracathro =

Coordinates: 56.7785°N 2.6216°W

Stracathro: Scottish Gaelic: Srath Catharach
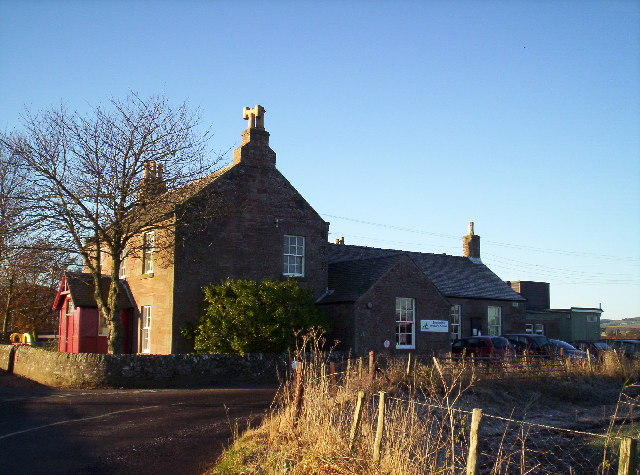
- Stracathro School

- Location within Angus
- Council area: Angus
- Lieutenancy area: Angus
- Country: Scotland
- Sovereign state: United Kingdom
- Post town: BRECHIN
- Postcode district: DD9
- Dialling code: 01356
- Police: Scotland
- Fire: Scottish
- Ambulance: Scottish
- UK Parliament: Angus
- Scottish Parliament: Angus North and Mearns

Stracathro (Scottish Gaelic: Srath Catharach) is a small place in Angus, Scotland. It was the site of a Roman marching camp as their forces invaded to the north.

== Location ==
Stracathro is located 2 1/2 miles (4.0 km) southeast of Edzell in north-east Angus. It lies to the north-east of Brechin on the A90.

== History ==
A Roman marching camp has been discovered at Stracathro. This camp is one day's march from the next camp, at Raedykes to the north. The gate design of the Stracathro Roman Camp is a distinctive bell-shaped indentation of the rampart perimeter.

Stracathro was the site of the Battle of Stracathro in 1130. This was the culmination of an invasion into southern Scotland led by Angus, ruler of the partially independent "kingdom" of Moray. He wanted to expand his territory and obtain recognition as a ruler independent of the Scottish kings. Angus was met by the royal army, led by the Constable of Scotland in the absence of King David, who had pressing business in England. The result was a decisive victory for the king's men. Four thousand Moravians were killed, including Angus, and Moray became wholly part of the kingdom of Scotland.

At Stracathro on 7 July 1296, John Balliol publicly admitted the errors of his ways and confirmed his reconciliation with Edward I, King of England. John Balliol abdicated on 10 July, the arms of Scotland were formally torn from his surcoat, and he was held for three years in the Tower of London. After that he was allowed to flee to France, where he died in 1314. His abdication and surrender of the Royal Crown and Seal of the Kingdom of Scotland to Edward I of England led to the First War of Scottish Independence.

=== Late 19th century to present ===
Construction of a railway to this area connected it to other villages. The station here was opened as Inchbare and then briefly renamed Dunlappie before finally being named Stracathro. From 1896 to 1964, Stracathro railway station served the sparsely populated rural area around the villages of Stracathro and Inchbare, as well as Dunlappie and other estates on the Brechin and Edzell District Railway.

== Stracathro House ==
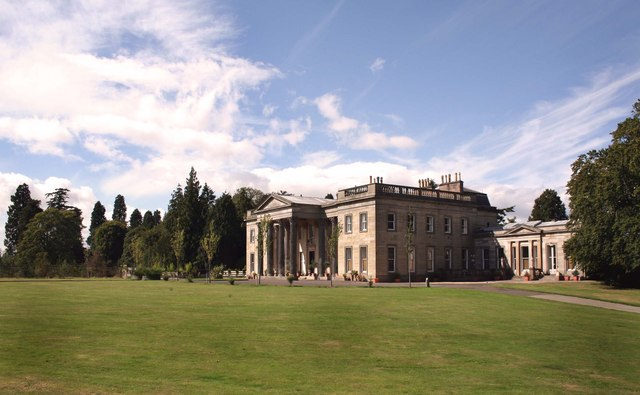
Stracathro House

Stracathro House is an A-listed Palladian-style mansion, overlooking the Cruick Water. In 1775, the Stracathro Estate, which extended to almost 800 hectares (2,000 acres), was bought by Patrick Cruickshank. He had made his fortune in Jamaica in sugar plantations. His brother, Alexander, inherited the property and employed the Aberdeen-based architect Archibald Simpson (1790–1847) to build the house between 1824 and 1827, together with a deer-park and gardens. In 1874, the house and estate was purchased by Sir James Campbell (1790–1876), Lord Provost of Glasgow and father of Prime Minister Sir Henry Campbell-Bannerman (1836–1908).

Stracathro House was requisitioned by the government in 1938 but reverted to private ownership following its sale by Tayside Health Board in 2003. It is being refurbished as a family home. Cottages in the grounds are let as self-catering holiday accommodation.

== Stracathro Hospital ==
A temporary Emergency Medical Services Hospital was established in the grounds of Stracathro House to cope with military and civilian casualties during the Second World War. Stracathro Hospital became an NHS hospital and is now managed by NHS Tayside.
