= Balfour, Aberdeenshire =

Coordinates: 57°3′33″N 2°21′16″W

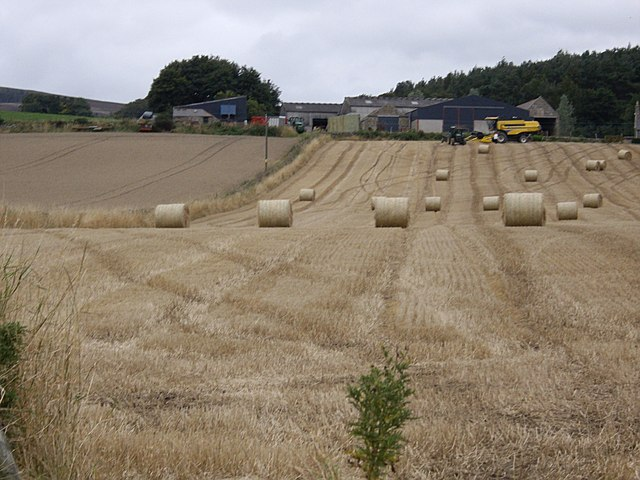

Balfour (Scottish Gaelic: Baile Phùir), Aberdeenshire is a settlement on Royal Deeside in Aberdeenshire, Scotland. Balfour lies south of the River Dee.

== History ==
Roman legions marched from Raedykes to Normandykes Roman Camp through the Durris Forest, not far from Balfour as they sought higher ground evading the bogs of Red Moss and other low-lying areas associated with the Burn of Muchalls. That march used the Elsick Mounth, one of the ancient trackways crossing the Mounth of the Grampian Mountains, lying west of Netherley. The important Mesolithic settlement of Balbridie is located nearby.

== Notable residents ==
The Farquharsons of Balfour were the main landholders in the area.

The family included the surgeon, William Farquharson FRSE.

== See also ==
- Durris Forest
- Maryculter House
- Muchalls Castle
