= Maryculter =

Village near Aberdeen in Scotland

Coordinates: 57.084°N 2.237°W

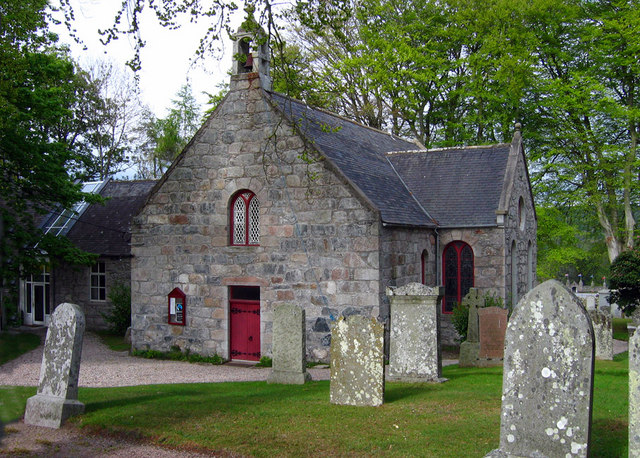
- Maryculter Parish Church

- Location within Aberdeenshire
- OS grid reference: NO857991
- Council area: Aberdeenshire
- Lieutenancy area: Aberdeenshire
- Country: Scotland
- Sovereign state: United Kingdom
- Post town: ABERDEEN
- Postcode district: AB12
- Dialling code: 01224
- Police: Scotland
- Fire: Scottish
- Ambulance: Scottish
- UK Parliament: West Aberdeenshire and Kincardine
- Scottish Parliament: Aberdeenshire West

Maryculter or Kirkton of Maryculter is a village in the Lower Deeside area of Aberdeenshire, Scotland. The River Dee separates it from the town of Peterculter, and the B979 road runs through Maryculter.

Maryculter House Hotel lies slightly north of the village along the south bank of the River Dee and to the west of Templars Park. The Old Mill Inn, a former coaching inn dating back to the 18th century lay at the mouth of the Crynoch Burn from 1797 until its demolition in February 2021 after being damaged by an extensive fire.

At the edge of the village of Maryculter is a public forest land, known as the Oldman Wood, through which flows the Crynoch Burn. There is also the children's theme park, The Den and the Glen, which also consists of a shop and restaurant. Within the centre of the community is the old church which is still in use today as Maryculter Trinity Church of Scotland (formed in 2000), a historic merger of the congregations of Banchory-Devenick, Cookney and Maryculter. Other notable buildings in the area include the former Lairhillock Inn which closed in March 2020 and Muchalls Castle. Maryculter also has an animal sanctuary, Blaikiewell Animal Sanctuary.

Templars' Park Scout Campsite in Maryculter is a 95-acre site owned by Aberdeen District Scouts which has hosted hundreds of thousands of scouts since 1935. It was officially opened by Lord Baden Powell, founder of the Scout Movement, in 1936.

== Ancient history ==
Prehistoric habitation in the Maryculter area is known through archaeological sites such as Balbridie situated somewhat west of Maryculter. Roman legions marched from Raedykes to Normandykes, marching slightly west of Maryculter, as they sought higher ground evading the bogs of Red Moss and other low-lying mosses associated with the Burn of Muchalls. That march used the Elsick Mounth, one of the ancient trackways crossing the Grampian Mountains, lying west of Netherley.

== Notable residents ==
- Rev. Prof. George Glennie FRSE DD (1768–1845), minister, born and raised in the village
- George John Robert Gordon (1812–1912), diplomat, born at Auchlunies House in Maryculter
- Eleanor Vere Boyle (née Gordon; 1825–1916), artist, born at Auchlunies House in Maryculter
- Rev. William Selbie (1823–1895), minister of the Free Church in Maryculter from 1853 to 1895

== Bibliography ==
Nicol, Norman D (1999) Maryculter in the Eighteenth Century: Lairds, Kirk and People in a Lower Deeside Parish
