= Lochton =

Coordinates: 57°1′15″N 2°24′5″W

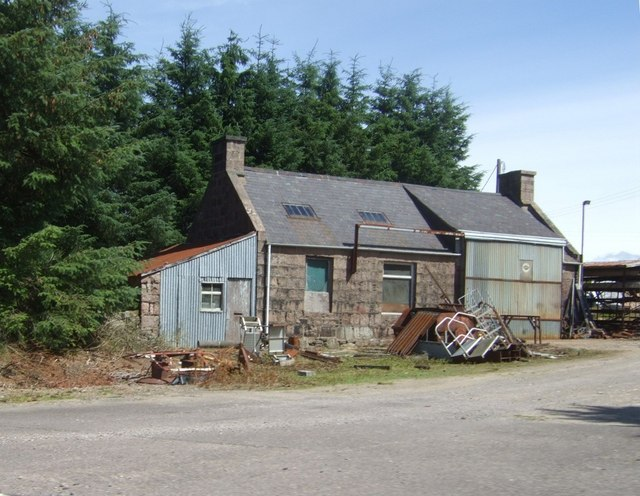

Lochton is a settlement on the Slug Road in Aberdeenshire, Scotland. Roman legions marched from Raedykes to Normandykes Roman Camp somewhat east of Lochton, using higher ground evading the bogs of Red Moss and other low-lying areas including the Burn of Muchalls. That march used the nearby Elsick Mounth, an ancient trackways crossing the Mounth of the Grampian Mountains, lying westerly of Netherley.

== See also ==
- Cairn Mon Earn
