= Thomshill =

Archeological site in Scotland

- The Foths
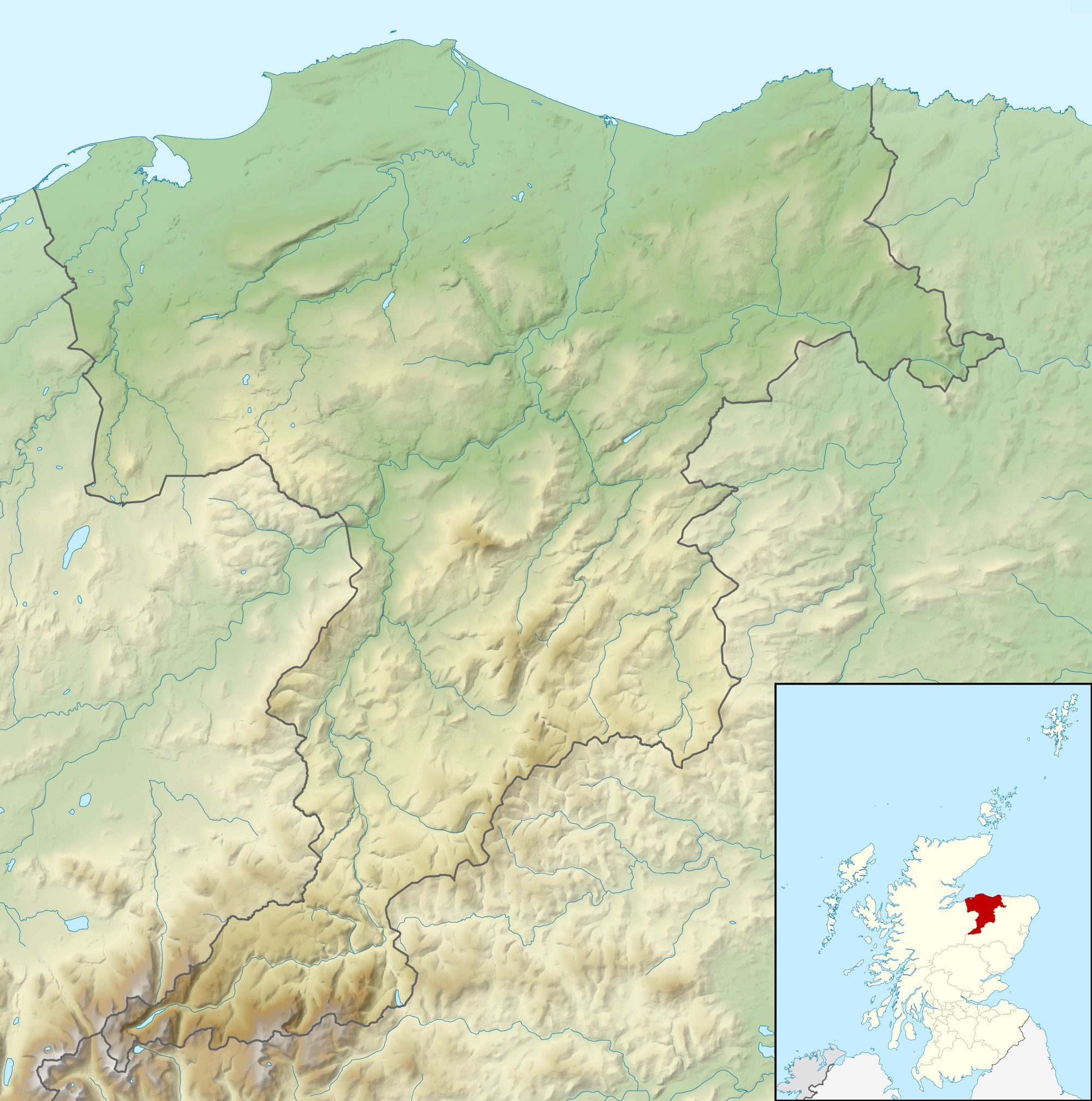
- Location within Moray
- 57.5996°N 3.3224°W
- Type: Quingenary fort (possible)

Site notes
- Excavation dates: 1982–1990
- Condition: Cropmarks

Thomshill, located 6 kilometres (3.7 mi) south of Elgin in Moray, Scotland, is the site of an excavated rectilinear enclosure that has been interpreted as a possible Roman military camp or fort. The enclosure covers an area of approximately 3.25 hectares (8.0 acres) and is situated at a height of 72 metres (236 ft) above ordnance datum.

Alongside similar sites at Boyndie, Balnageith, Easter Galcantray and Tarradale, the possibility that Thomshill represents a Roman fort has been seen as evidence that the Roman Army under Agricola occupied Moray after the Battle of Mons Graupius in AD84.

== Discovery and excavation ==
In 1834 the New Statistical Account of Scotland described "rectangular trenches, or, as some may say, a Roman castra at The Foths" within the parish of Birnie. In 1871 the Ordnance Survey recorded "the remains of rectangular trenches, said to be a Roman camp, but almost erased by cultivation" in the district. By 1971 no visible trace remained.

Ground observation and aerial photography during the 1980s revealed cropmarks suggesting three sides of a rectilinear ditched enclosure, situated on an eroded spur overlooking a dry river valley dominated by two nearby distilleries. Trial excavations took place in September 1982; and over subsequent excavations between 1985 and 1990 a total of 44 trenches were cut across the lines of the ditch, the interior of the enclosure and notable surrounding features.

Excavation showed the site's enclosing ditch to be V-shaped, with a well-defined sump or cleaning slot along the base. Clear evidence of a turf revetment was found on the inner edge of the ditch. which was up to 5 metres (16 ft) wide. The corners of the enclosure were rounded and a series of post-holes were found close to the inner edge of the southern side of the enclosure. Two small ditches that predated the main enclosure were also found on the site, and were taken to represent an unknown earlier phase of occupation.

== Interpretation ==
The absence of direct dating evidence makes assigning a date and function difficult, but the site was interpreted by its excavators as representing a Roman military work of Agricolan date, based on its location, its plan as a rectangular enclosure with rounded corners, and the apparently Roman V-shaped profile of the ditch itself. The enclosed area of 1.75 hectares (4.3 acres) is far smaller than that of known Roman temporary marching camps in North East Scotland, such as Auchinhove (14 hectares (35 acres)), Muiryfold (44 hectares (110 acres)), Durno (58 hectares (140 acres)) or the two camps at Ythan Wells (14 hectares (35 acres) and 45 hectares (110 acres)). Thomshill's excavators argued that its closest parallels were the single-ditched forts of the Flavian period found elsewhere in Scotland such as that at Fendoch, suggesting that Thomshill might have been an auxiliary fort built to house a quingenary unit. The site lies less than 1 kilometre (0.62 mi) from the large native Iron Age and Roman period settlement at Birnie, a pattern demonstrated by many other Roman sites in the north of Scotland.

Following these excavations, the site at Thomshill was interpreted as being comparable to those at Balnageith, Boyndie and Easter Galcantray, which were seen as semi-permanent Roman fortifications and explained as the hibernia or winter quarters taken in or close to the land of the Boresti by the forces of Agricola after their victory at the Battle of Mons Graupius, as described by Tacitus in his biography Agricola.

This interpretation has proved controversial, with much of the evidence criticised as circumstantial. Some reviewers have questioned whether the sites are Roman at all; some have argued that the Roman status of the sites is possible but unproven, on the basis that rectilinear enclosures of this scale are not otherwise found among native sites in the Moray area; others have argued that they "would be accepted without cavil as Roman anywhere else". Of the suggested sites Thomshill has been seen as particularly problematic due its lack of dating evidence or surviving internal features.

== Bibliography ==
- "Thomshill". Canmore. Royal Commission on the Ancient and Historical Monuments of Scotland.
- Gregory, Richard A. (2002). "Excavations by the late G D B Jones and C M Daniels along the moray Firth littoral" (PDF). Proceedings of the Society of Antiquaries of Scotland. 131: 177–222. doi:10.9750/PSAS.131.177.222.
- Jones, Barri; Keillar, Ian (2002). "'In Fines Borestorum': Reconstructing the Archaeological Landscapes of Prehistoric and Proto-Historic Moray". Northern Scotland. 22: 1–25. doi:10.3366/nor.2002.0002.
