= Cairn Mon Earn =

Hill in Aberdeenshire, Scotland

Coordinates: 57°1′6″N 2°21′29″W

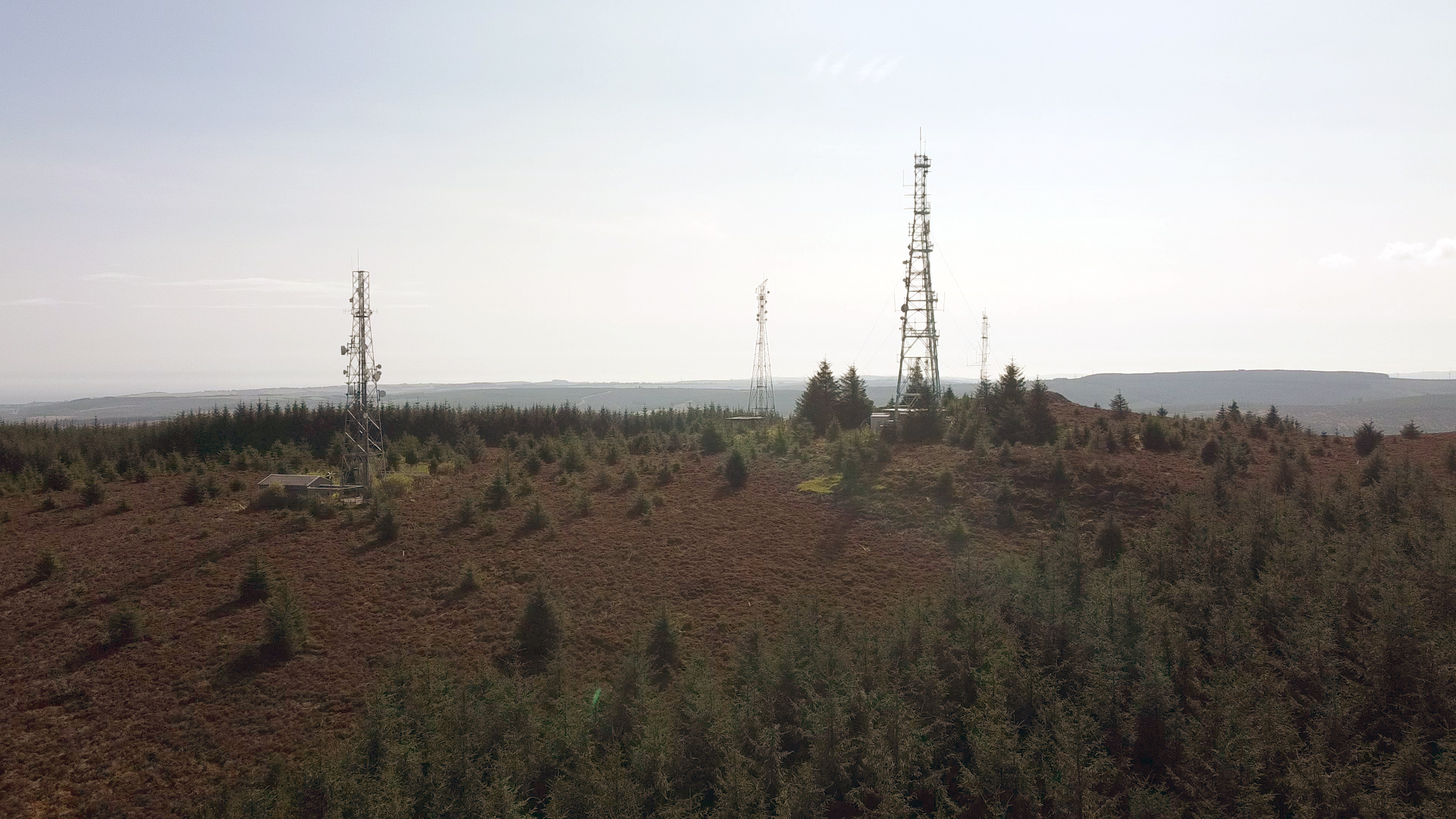
Aerial view of the summit of Cairn Mon Earn

Cairn Mon Earn or Cairn-mon-earn is a hill in Aberdeenshire, Scotland.

== Location ==
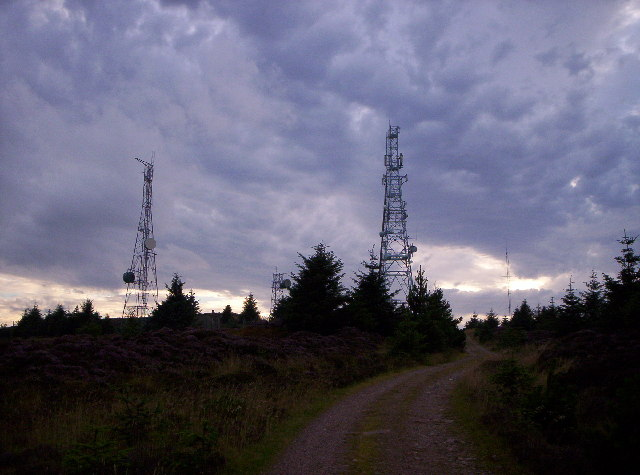
Telecommunication masts on Cairn Mon Earn

Cairn Mon Earn (OS: Cairn-mon-earn) lies within the Durris Forest, in the Mounth region of the Grampian Mountains. It forms the backdrop to Netherley and is visible from coastal hills such as Kempstone Hill and Megray Hill.

With a height of 378 metres (1,240 ft) and a drop of 150 metres (490 ft), Cairn Mon Earn is listed as a Marilyn. There is a trig point and several telecommunication masts at the summit.

== History ==
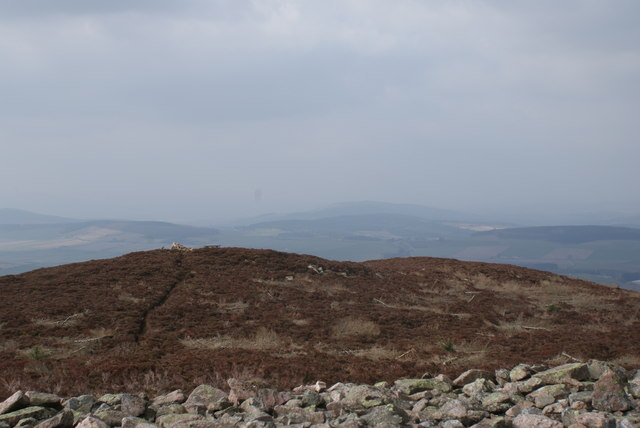
View from the summit of Cairn Mon Earn

Situated close to the summit is a substantial burial cairn of the Early Bronze Age. A modern Triangulation station (aka. Trig point) is located on part of the cairn.

Roman legions marched from Raedykes to Normandykes Roman Camp, somewhat east of Cairn Mon Earn as they sought higher ground evading the bogs of Red Moss and other low-lying mosses including the Burn of Muchalls. That march used the Elsick Mounth, an ancient trackway crossing the Mounth of the Grampian Mountains, lying westerly of Netherley.

== See also ==
- Lochton
