= Kintore, Aberdeenshire =

Town in Aberdeenshire, Scotland

Coordinates: 57.2332°N 2.3461°W

Kintore: Scottish Gaelic: Ceann Tòrr
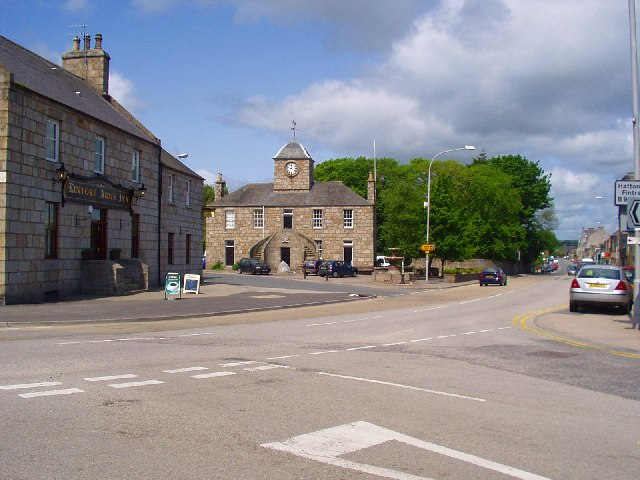
- Kintore Town House located in The Square

- Location within Aberdeenshire
- Population: 4,700 (2020)
- OS grid reference: NJ793163
- Council area: Aberdeenshire
- Lieutenancy area: Aberdeenshire
- Country: Scotland
- Sovereign state: United Kingdom
- Post town: INVERURIE
- Postcode district: AB51
- Dialling code: 01467
- Police: Scotland
- Fire: Scottish
- Ambulance: Scottish
- UK Parliament: Gordon and Buchan
- Scottish Parliament: Aberdeenshire East

Kintore (/kɪnˈtɔːr/; Scottish Gaelic: Ceann Tòrr) is a town and former royal burgh near Inverurie in Aberdeenshire, Scotland, now bypassed by the A96 road between Aberdeen and Inverness. It is situated on the banks of the River Don.

Nearby are the remains of Hallforest Castle, former stronghold of the Earls of Kintore.

== History ==
Established in the ninth century AD as a royal burgh, Kintore had its royal charter renewed by King James IV in 1506. But the area has clearly been a popular settlement since prehistoric times. Recent archaeological excavations show Neolithic finds dating to at least 5000 BC. Kintore Town House was completed in 1747.

In 2018, Aberdeenshire Council estimated that around 4,790 people lived in Kintore.

== Education ==
The town is served by two primary schools, Kintore Primary School and Midmill Primary School. For secondary education, local pupils travel by bus to nearby Kemnay and attend Kemnay Academy.

The original Kintore Primary School building opened in 1907, and was extended in the 1950s. In February 2006, a new school building was opened at Castle Walk, housing sixteen classrooms, an early years centre, and a library. The old school building was subsequently demolished.

Due to the increasing population of Kintore, a second school was built to the south of the town. The £11.5 million Midmill Primary School opened in November 2016, and has a capacity of 540 pupils. The building is located on Carnie Road and comprises nineteen teaching areas, a hall, library, dining area, and outdoor sports facility. The school was officially opened by the Princess Royal in March 2017, and a commemorative plaque was unveiled.

== Roman camp ==
Kintore is the site of Deers Den Roman camp and is thought to relate to Agricola's campaigns into Scotland; moreover, Deers Den is associated with the Severan invasion. Archaeologists say that the Kintore camp was definitely occupied in 120 AD and may have been occupied on as many as three occasions during the Scottish campaigns before lack of resources and more pressing matters elsewhere in the Roman Empire induced consolidation and retreat.

The Romans, it is believed, were attracted by the belief that Scotland was rich in natural resources, including gold, silver and tin. The Deer's Den camp could have been involved in the preparations for the decisive battle of Mons Graupius; however, most researchers argue that the site of Mons Graupius was further south in Aberdeenshire, possibly near Raedykes at Kempstone Hill or Megray Hill.

Arriving from the south, Roman legions marched from Raedykes to Normandykes Roman Camp through the Durris Forest as they sought higher ground, evading the bogs of Red Moss and other low-lying mosses associated with the Burn of Muchalls. That march used the Elsick Mounth, one of the ancient trackways crossing the Mounth of the Grampian Mountains, lying west of Netherley.

== Transportation ==
The Aberdeen to Inverness railway line lies to the west of Kintore. Since October 2020 the town is once again served by Kintore railway station. Kintore is bypassed to the west by the A96 road. Stagecoach Bluebird provide local bus links to nearby towns and Aberdeen.

== North East Community Radio ==
NECR (North East Community Radio) was a local radio station based on School Road in Kintore. It began broadcasting in 1994, after gaining an Independent Local Radio Licence in 1993. It closed at midnight on 15 August 2018, after 24 years on air, due to difficult trading and growing pressure from the internet, which brought streaming more prominently to the minds of prospective Kintore listeners.

== Notable people ==
- Robert Marnock, 1800-1889, horticulturalist and garden designer, creator of Sheffield Botanical Gardens.
- James Park, 1857-1946, studied science in London, worked as sheep farmer in New Zealand, became professor of geology in Dunedin then Auckland. Father of Air Chief Marshal Sir Keith Park, "Defender of London" Battle of Britain 1940.
- Andy Beattie, played for Inverurie Locos FC and Preston North End.
- Caroline Phillips, Scottish suffragette and journalist.
- Connor Barron, Aberdeen and Rangers football player.
- Adele Steel, awarded an MBE for services to Girlguiding Scotland

== See also ==
- Normandykes
- Aberdeen Savings Bank
