= Craggie Cat =

Coordinates: 57.0255°N 2.2523°W

Craggie Cat is a hill landform in the Mounth of the Grampian Mountains at the southern edge of Netherley, Aberdeenshire, Scotland. The peak elevation of Craggie Cat is 198 metres according to the Ordnance Survey. This hill's southwestern flanks form the northwest boundary of the moorland of Curlethney Hill.

== History ==
Craggie Cat lies generally between the Roman Camps of Raedykes to the south and Normandykes to the north. Roman troops marching between the two Roman Camps would have used the Elsick Mounth trackway or a variant thereof. C. Michael Hogan hypothesizes that the route of march between these two camps would likely have been in the shadow of Craggie Cat, in order to avoid the boggy high ground to the west and the formidable impassable Red Moss bog to the northeast. Noted historical features in the vicinity include Netherley House and Muchalls Castle.

== See also ==
- Hill of Muchalls
- Red Moss
