= Coalford =

Coordinates: 57.0891°N 2.2952°W

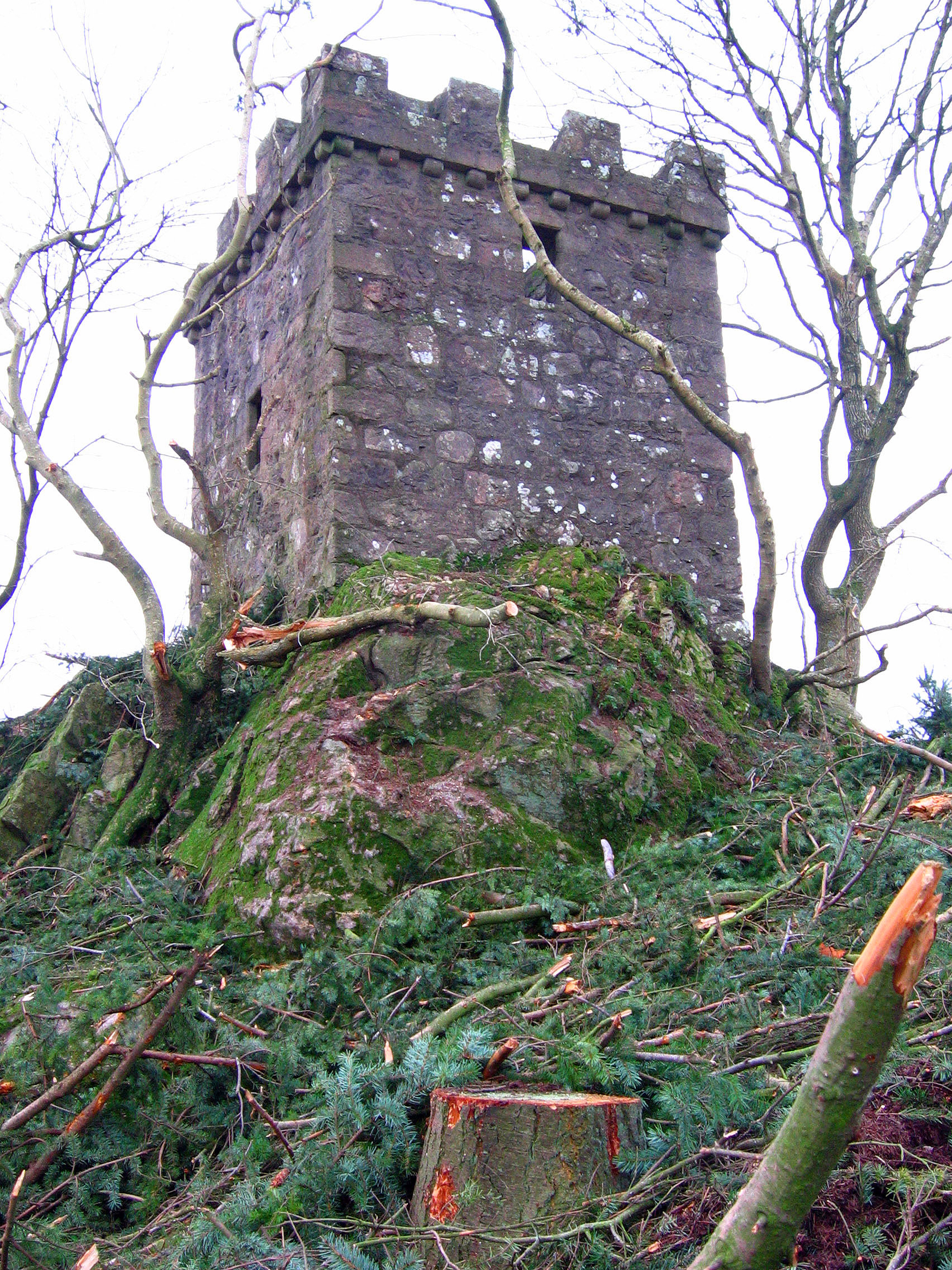
Belskavie tower

Coalford is a village in Drumoak, Aberdeenshire, Scotland. It is slightly north of the River Dee and about 1 mile (1.6 km) west of Peterculter. The population is around 100.

Nearby prehistoric sites along the Deeside include Balbridie and Bucharn. Also nearby is the Roman Camp of Normandykes, which was accessed from Raedykes via the Elsick Mounth trackway.

Historical structures in the vicinity include Drum Castle, Crathes Castle, Muchalls Castle, Maryculter House and the Lairhillock Inn.

Nearby is a statue of Rob Roy MacGregor.

Along the River Dee is a church ruin commonly known as "Dalmaik Church" or the "Coalford Church". A plaque at the entrance that it served as the "Kirk of Drumoak" from 1062 to 1836. Graves there date back to the 18th century.
