= Cairnie Burn =

Stream in Aberdeenshire, Scotland

Location
- Country: Scotland

Physical characteristics
- Source: Grampian Mountains
- Mouth: Crynoch Burn
  - location: Aberdeenshire, Scotland
  - coordinates: 57.05156°N 2.25065°W

Cairnie Burn is a stream that rises in the Mounth, or eastern range of the Grampian Mountains, north of Netherley, Aberdeenshire, Scotland. Cairnie Burn is a generally northeast flowing watercourse that is a tributary to the Crynoch Burn. Cairnie Burn rises in the eastern part of the Durris Forest, east of the Elsick Mounth passage.

== History ==
Roman legions marched from Raedykes to Normandykes Roman Camp crossing Cairnie Burn in the Durris Forest as they sought higher ground evading the bogs of Red Moss and other low-lying mosses associated with the Burn of Muchalls. That march used the Elsick Mounth, one of the ancient trackways crossing the Mounth of the Grampian Mountains, lying west of Netherley.

== In poetry ==
An 1890 poem entitled The Auld House O' Gask by Caroline Oliphant took note of Cairnie Burn: "that winds around the flowery bank of bonnie Cairnie Burn".

== See also ==
- Muchalls Castle
