= Durris Forest =

Forest in Aberdeenshire, Scotland

Coordinates: 57.028°N 2.349°W

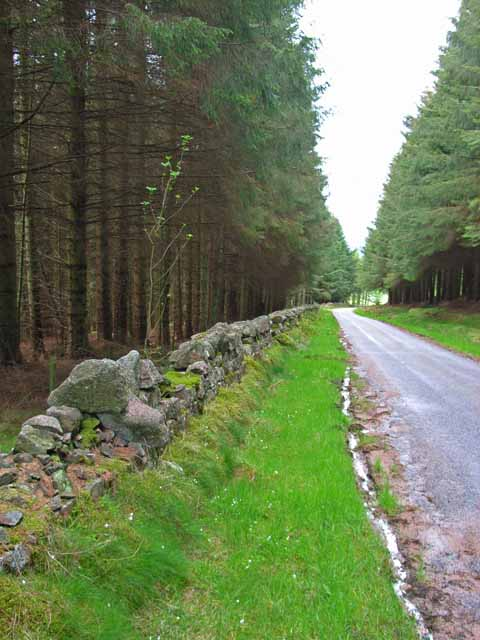
Road through Durris Forest

Durris Forest is a chiefly coniferous forest south of the River Dee approximately three kilometres west of Netherley in Aberdeenshire, Scotland. The A957 road forms the southwest boundary of Durris Forest, separating it from Fetteresso Forest. The Durris Forest includes several smaller named woodlands. The ancient route of Elsick Mounth crosses the Grampian Mounth within the Durris Forest. Notable natural features in the vicinity include Red Moss and Meikle Carewe Hill. Notable historic features in this area include Raedykes Roman Camp, Muchalls Castle and Maryculter House.

== History ==
Roman legions marched from Raedykes to Normandykes Roman Camp through the Durris Forest as they sought higher ground evading the bogs of Red Moss and other low-lying mosses associated with the Burn of Muchalls. That march used the Elsick Mounth, one of the ancient trackways crossing the Mounth of the Grampian Mountains, lying west of Netherley.

== See also ==
- Balbridie
- Balfour
- Cairn Mon Earn
- Fetteresso Forest
- Kirkton of Durris
