= Alexander Silver =

Scottish trader (Died 1797)

- Died: 1797; Netherley House
- Children: George Silver

Alexander Silver was a wealthy East India Company trader, who lived in Netherley, Aberdeenshire, Scotland in the late 18th century; he and his son George Silver were noted agricultural innovators of their era.

Alexander Silver built the Netherley House mansion in Netherley and died there in 1797. Alexander's son George acquired the estate of nearby Muchalls Castle by the year 1841.

Notable natural features in the vicinity include Red Moss and Meikle Carewe Hill. Notable historic features in this area include Raedykes Roman Camp and Maryculter House.
