= Muiryfold =

- Grange
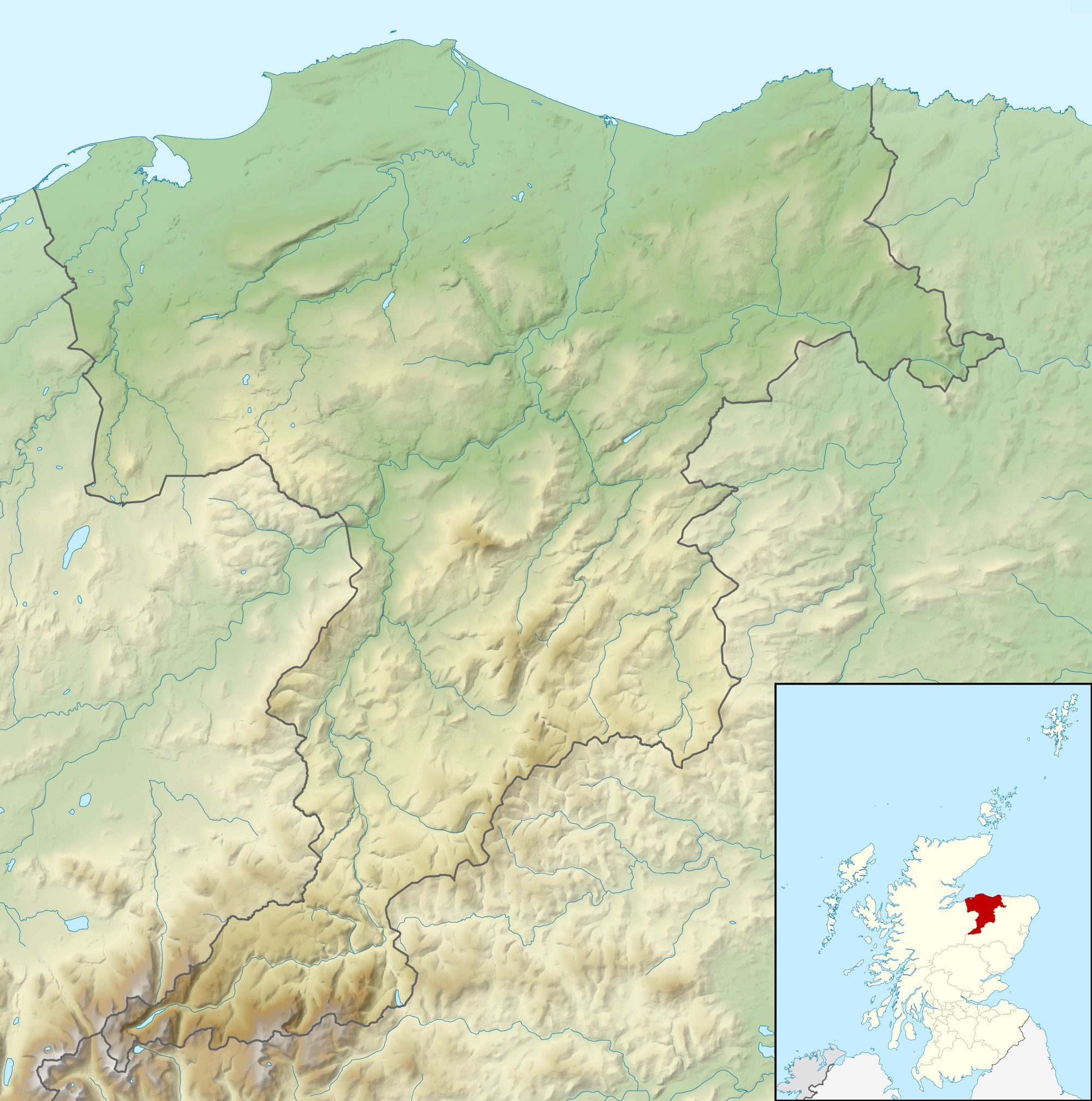
- Location within Moray
- 57.5563°N 2.8562°W
- Type: Marching camp

Site notes
- Excavation dates: 1959
- Archaeologists: Kenneth St Joseph
- Condition: Cropmark

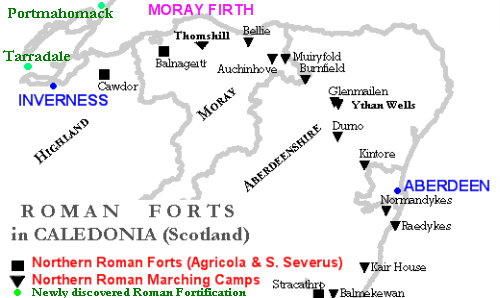
Map showing possible Roman sites

Muiryfold was one of the Roman fortifications built by Septimius Severus in northern Caledonia (modern-day Scotland). The site is located 6 kilometres (3.7 mi) east of Keith in Moray.

== Discovery and excavation ==
The site was discovered by aerial photography in 1959, and two small trenches were excavated across the north west and south east sides by Kenneth St Joseph the same year.

The camp was almost rectangular, measuring 784 metres (2,572 ft) from north west to south east, and 522 metres (1,713 ft) from north east to south west, covering an area of just over 41 hectares (100 acres).

== History ==
In 210 AD, the Emperor Septimius Severus made an attempt to conquer all Caledonia reaching the Moray Firth. He created a marching camp at Muiryfold, near the one created in 84 AD by Agricola at Auchinhove.

Speculation that Agricola and Septimius Severus reached further north in Scotland has been stimulated by discoveries at Portmahomack on the Dornoch Firth, and Tarradale on the north shore of the Beauly Firth. Neither have been confirmed as Roman sites.

The Roman legions in the first and second century established a chain of very large forts at Ardoch, Strageath, Inchtuthil, Battledykes, Stracathro and Raedykes, taking the Elsick Mounth on the way to Normandykes before going north to Glenmailen and possibly Bellie.

== Bibliography ==
- "Muiryfold, Grange". Moray Sites and Monuments Record. Moray Council.
- Frere, S. Britannia: a History of Roman Britain. Londra, 1998. ISBN 0-7126-5027-X
- Hanson, W S (1980) The first Roman occupation of Scotland, in Hanson, W S and Keppie, L J F Roman Frontier studies 1979: Papers presented to the 12th International Congress of Roman Frontier Studies, Brit Archaeol Rep, International, vol.S71, 1 Oxford 15-43
- Moffat, Alistair. Before Scotland: The Story of Scotland Before History. Thames & Hudson. Londra, 2005. ISBN 0-500-05133-X
- St Joseph, J K (1961) Air reconnaissance in Britain, 1958-60, J Roman Stud, vol.51 123

== See also ==
- Cawdor (Roman Fort)
- Deers Den
- Inchtuthil
- Pennymuir Roman camps
- Normandykes
- Ythan Wells
- Gask Ridge
