= List of listed buildings in Kintore, Aberdeenshire =

This is a list of listed buildings in the parish of Kintore in Aberdeenshire, Scotland.

== List ==
| Name | Location | Date listed | Grid ref. (Note: Sometimes known as OSGB36, the grid reference (where provided) is based on the British national grid reference system used by the Ordnance Survey. • "Guide to National Grid". Ordnance Survey. • "Get-a-map". Ordnance Survey.) | Geo-coordinates | Notes | LB number (Note: Historic Environment Scotland assign a unique alphanumeric identifier to each designated site in Scotland, for listed buildings this always begins with "LB", for example "LB12345".) | Image |
|---|---|---|---|---|---|---|---|
| Kintore Bridge | | | | 57°14′10″N 2°20′21″W | Category B | 36316 | Upload another image |
| Boghead Farmhouse | | | | 57°12′35″N 2°19′34″W | Category B | 9125 | Upload Photo |
| North Street, Bridgend Including Steading, Ancillary Building, Summer House And Boundary Walls | | | | 57°14′28″N 2°21′05″W | Category C(S) | 49868 | Upload Photo |
| Kintore Parish Church The Square | | | | 57°14′13″N 2°20′40″W | Category B | 36310 | Upload another image |
| Thainstone Policies Gate Lodge And Gate Pilks On Kintore - Inverurie Road | | | | 57°15′27″N 2°22′06″W | Category B | 9153 | Upload Photo |
| Hall Forest Castle | | | | 57°13′44″N 2°22′14″W | Category B | 9154 | Upload another image See more images |
| Aquherton Farmhouse | | | | 57°12′09″N 2°21′32″W | Category B | 9155 | Upload Photo |
| The Square Goosecroft House | | | | 57°14′14″N 2°20′47″W | Category B | 36311 | Upload another image |
| Hangar, Cairnhall, Near Kintore | | | | 57°14′54″N 2°21′27″W | Category B | 13470 | Upload another image |
| Kintore Town House The Square | | | | 57°14′14″N 2°20′44″W | Category A | 36312 | Upload another image See more images |
| Kintore Lodge Kingsfield Road | | | | 57°14′04″N 2°20′21″W | Category B | 36314 | Upload Photo |
| Kintore Arms Hotel The Square | | | | 57°14′12″N 2°20′44″W | Category B | 36313 | Upload another image |
| Gate And Garden Wall, Kintore Lodge, Kingsfield Road | | | | 57°14′04″N 2°20′20″W | Category B | 36315 | Upload Photo |
| Thainstone House | | | | 57°15′29″N 2°22′48″W | Category B | 9152 | Upload another image See more images |

== Key ==
The scheme for classifying buildings in Scotland is:

- Category A: "buildings of national or international importance, either architectural or historic; or fine, little-altered examples of some particular period, style or building type."
- Category B: "buildings of regional or more than local importance; or major examples of some particular period, style or building type, which may have been altered."
- Category C: "buildings of local importance; lesser examples of any period, style, or building type, as originally constructed or moderately altered; and simple traditional buildings which group well with other listed buildings."

In March 2016 there were 47,288 listed buildings in Scotland. Of these, 8% were Category A, and 50% were Category B, with the remaining 42% being Category C.

== See also ==
- List of listed buildings in Aberdeenshire
