= Bellie =

Locality in Moray, Scotland

Romancamp Gate
- Bellie
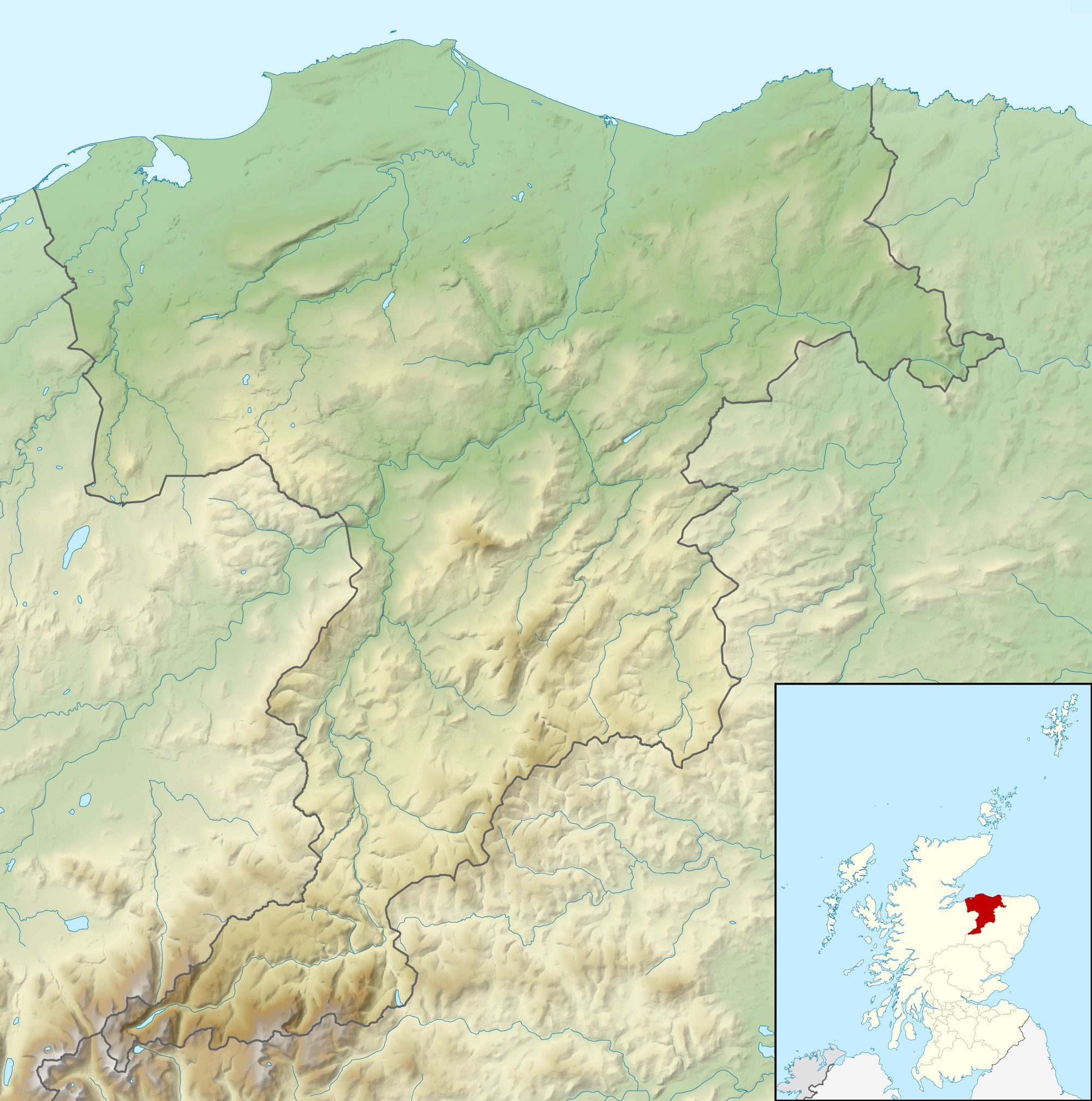
- Location within Moray
- 57.6414°N 3.0763°W
- Type: Marching camp (possible)

Site notes
- Discovered: 1799

Bellie
- Fochabers
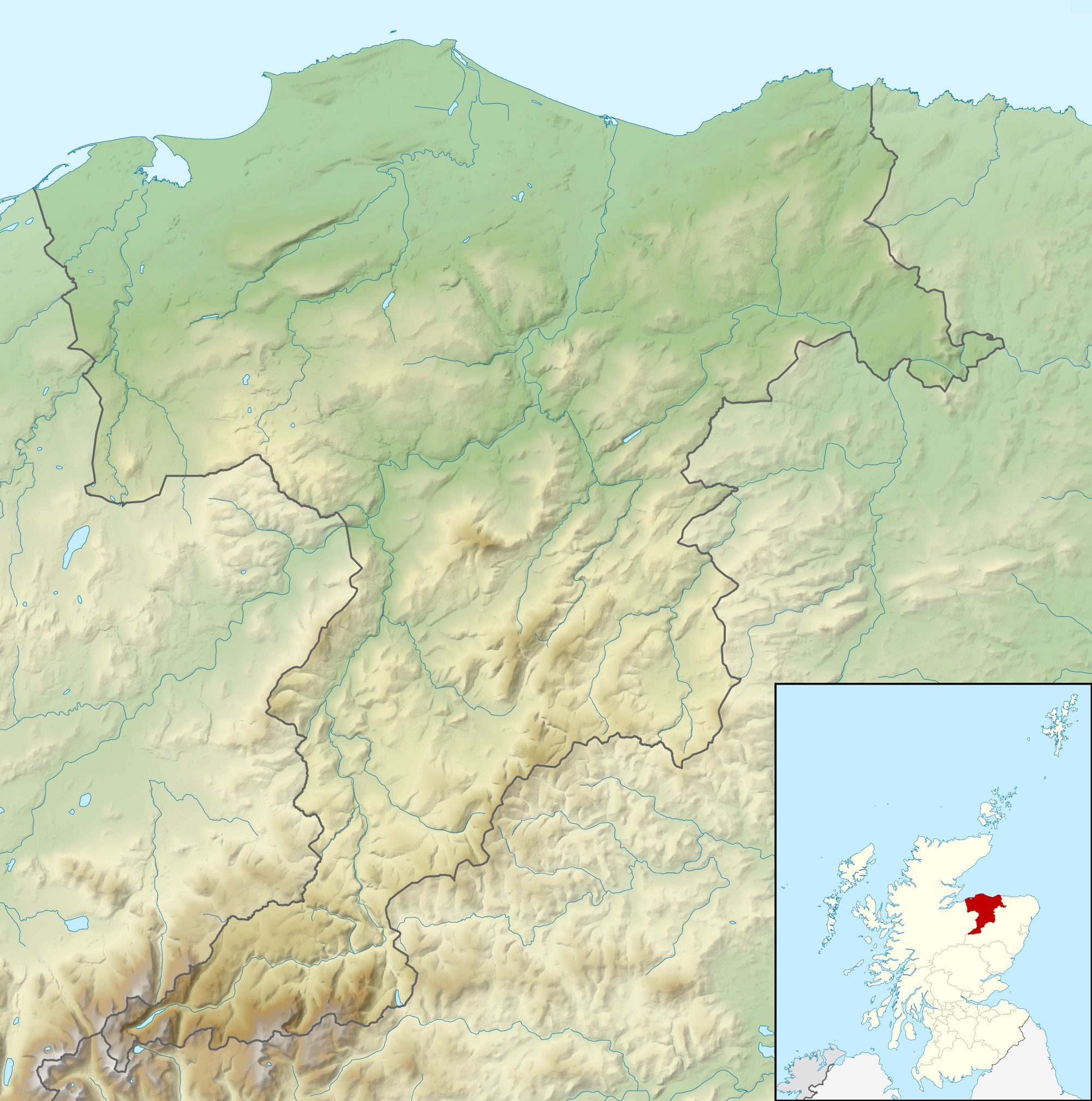
- Location within Moray
- 57.6349°N 3.0828°W
- Type: Marching camp (possible)

Site notes
- Discovered: 1967

Bellie is a locality in Moray, Scotland. Little survives of the old parish church at Bellie, located 2 miles north of Fochabers, although its graveyard is preserved. There is a Bellie Kirk in Fochabers, which replaced the old church in 1798.

There are up to two possible Roman camps at Bellie. Either of these sites, if accepted as a Roman camp, would constitute the most northerly example known, being 10 miles north-west of the known camps at Auchinhove and Muiryfold.

== Possible Roman sites ==
The first site is known as Romancamp Gate, and lies 100 metres to the north-east of the old church of Bellie, with a 50 feet (15 m) cliff to the north-west that lies on the east bank of the River Spey. The site was recorded by the antiquarian George Chalmers in 1799 as "the remains of the Roman encampment overlooking the low ground by the river ... on plan nearly a rectangular parallelogram of 888' by 333', but the W and most of the N sides have been destroyed." In the mid 20th century O. G. S. Crawford noted that the enclosure's size would make it considerably smaller than any other known Roman camp in Scotland and felt that the lack of identified gates counted against it being Roman, but also acknowledged that it was difficult to assign it to any other period. Air investigation in 1943 revealed cropmarks of ditches, including a rounded corner at the south-west, but the site was extensively damaged during World War II by the construction of a military camp including emergency stone shelters. In 1964 two pieces of silver 3 inches (7.6 cm) long and dated to AD51 were found at the rear of the site. Excavation along the south-west side in 1971 revealed a ditch 2.5 feet (0.76 m) deep and 5 feet (1.5 m) wide, but found no evidence to prove that it was Roman.

Approximately 400 metres (1,300 ft) south of the site at Romancamp gate, a second site was excavated in 1967 by Kenneth St Joseph, who traced a V-shaped ditch running for 975 feet (297 m) on a north–south alignment, measuring 7 feet (2.1 m) wide and 3 feet (0.91 m) deep where best preserved. St Joseph identified the position and profile of the ditch as strongly suggesting it was Roman, in which case he felt it would probably form part of a camp from the Flavian period measuring up to 900 feet (270 m) by 1,200 feet (370 m) and occupying around 30 acres (12 ha). Aerial photography in 1984 recorded another linear cropmark on the site with a well-rounded northern corner, that was excavated in 1986 and revealed the shallow remains of a ditch about 2 metres (6.6 ft) wide. Study of other aerial photographs taken on the 1970s and 1980s by the University of Cambridge suggests cropmarks provisionally showing the characteristics of a Roman camp lying to the east of Bellie old church and partially covered by an adjacent plantation.

== Bibliography ==
- "Roman Camp Gate". Canmore. Royal Commission on the Ancient and Historical Monuments of Scotland.
- "Bellie". Canmore. Royal Commission on the Ancient and Historical Monuments of Scotland.
- Leslie, Alan F. (1995). Roman temporary camps in Britain (PhD). University of Glasgow.
- "Romancamp Gate". Moray Sites and Monuments Record. Moray Council.
