= Kirkton of Durris =

Coordinates: 57°3′22″N 2°22′29″W

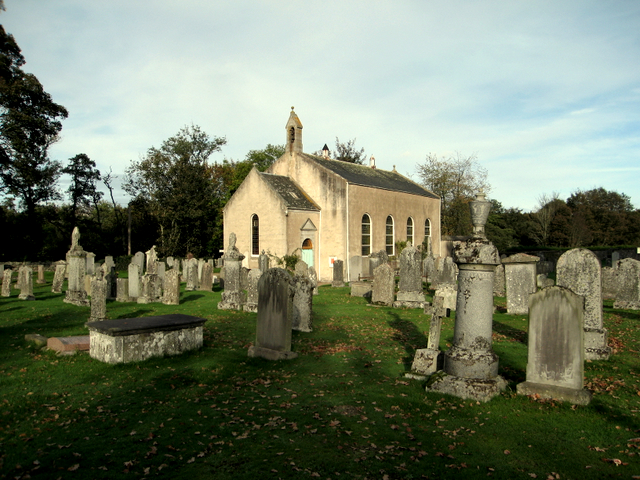

Kirkton of Durris is a hamlet in the Kincardine and Mearns area of Aberdeenshire, Scotland.

== Structures ==
Historic structures in the vicinity include Maryculter House, Durris House and Muchalls Castle.

== History ==
A short history of the parish of Durris was written in 2019: The Parish of Durris: some historical sketches. 239pp. ISBN 978-1-5272-3732-2. The author was Robin Jackson.

The book contains the following chapters: 1. Early history; 2. Religious history of Durris; 3. Statistical accounts; 4. Life in a rural parish: Part one; 5. Life in a rural parish: Part two; 6. A Durris kirk mystery; 7. Durris House; 8. Lairds and proprietors of Durris; 9. The Milne family of Durris; 10. Conclusion.

== See also ==
- Durris Forest
