= Coleford =

Coleford may refer to a number of settlements in England:

- Coleford, Devon
- Coleford, Gloucestershire
- Coleford, Somerset

== See also ==
- Coalford, a village in Aberdeenshire, Scotland
- Coalford, an area of Jackfield, a village in Shropshire, England
