= Coy Burn =

Stream in Aberdeenshire, Scotland

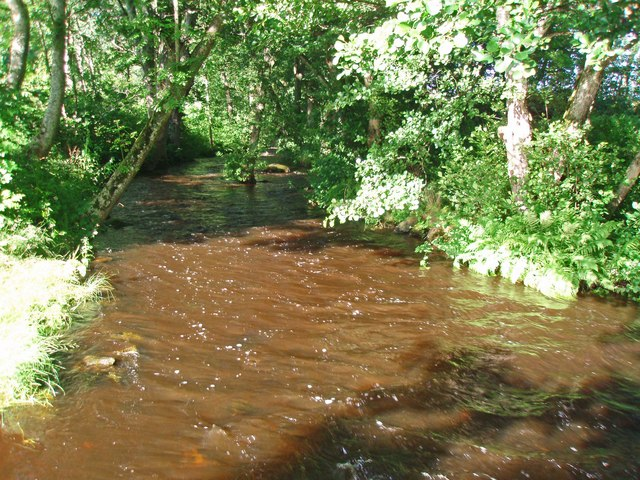
- Coy Burn at the Milton of Crathes

Location
- Country: Scotland

Physical characteristics
- Source: Hills north of Banchory
- Mouth: River Dee
  - location: Milton of Crathes
  - coordinates: 57.05500°N 2.42753°W

Coy Burn is a stream that rises in the hills north of Banchory in Aberdeenshire, Scotland. Coy Burn discharges to the River Dee at Milton of Crathes.

== History ==
The Coy Burn along with certain other natural waters of Scotland has been under study for its role in Salmon spawning. A number of prehistorical features lie nearby including Balbridie and Bucharn to the south of the River Dee. Vicinity historical features include Crathes Castle, Maryculter House and Muchalls Castle.

== See also ==
- Balbridie
