= Milton of Crathes =

Village in Aberdeenshire, Scotland

Coordinates: 57.0558°N 2.4274°W

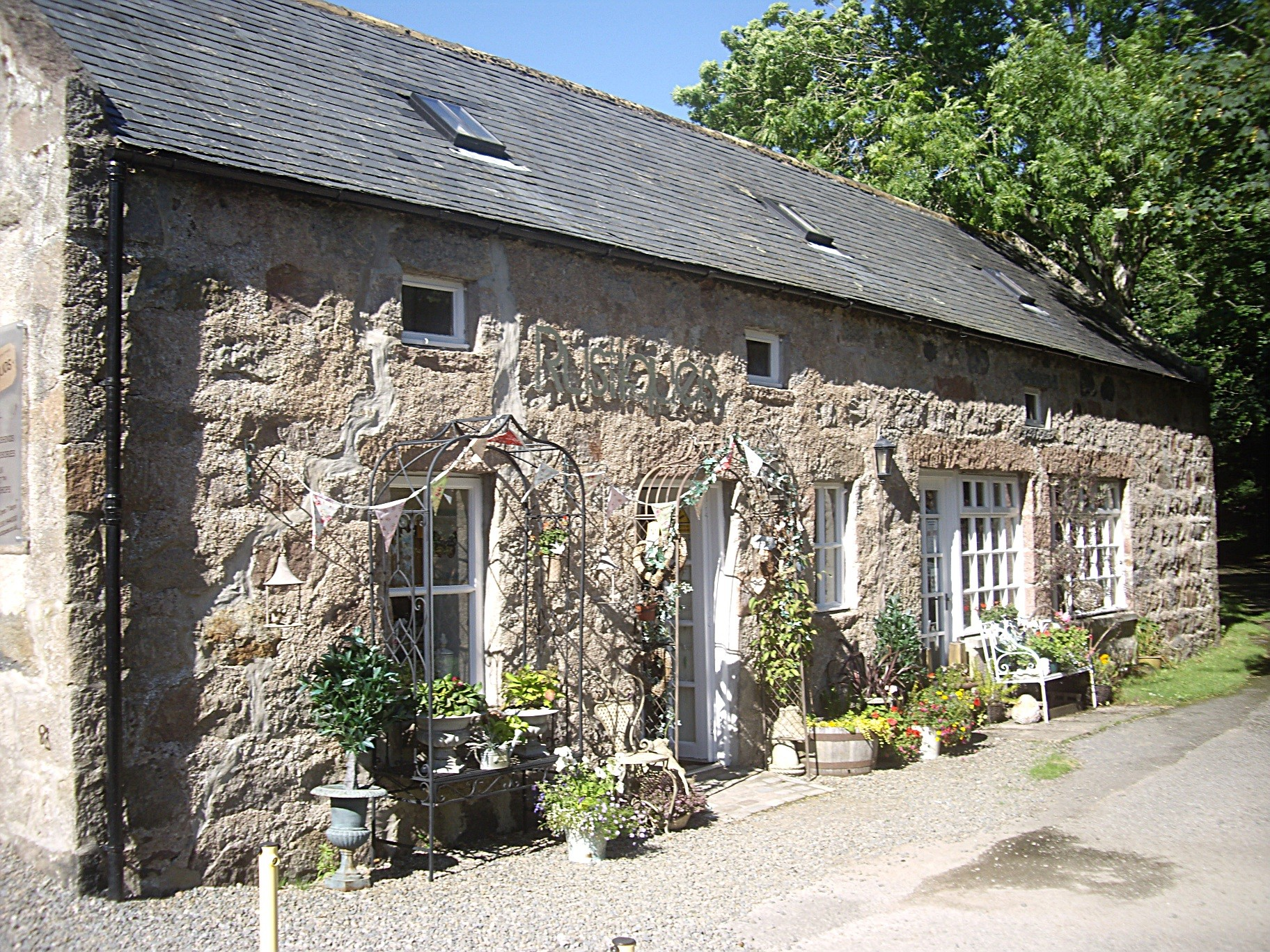
Milton of Crathes antiques shop

Milton of Crathes is a complex of restored 17th-century stone buildings, associated with, and previously an outlier of, Crathes Castle in Aberdeenshire, Scotland. The site is presently used for retail and restaurant purposes.

The location is close to the terminus of the Royal Deeside Railway. Coy Burn passes through the complex immediately before discharging to the River Dee.

== See also ==
- Balbridie
