= Francis Loraine Petre =

British civil servant in India

F. Loraine Petre
- Born: 22 February 1852; Netherley House, in Aberdeen, Scotland
- Died: 6 May 1925 (aged 73); London, England
- Education: Oscott College
- Occupation: Indian Civil Service
- Known for: Military historian
- Spouse: Maud Ellen Rawlinson (1863–1945)
- Children: Roderick L. Petre 28 November 1887–1971; Enid Petre, 1890–1962; Elaine Maud Petre, b/d. 1894
- Parent(s): The Honourable Edmund George Petre; Marianna Jane Kerr
- Relatives: William Petre, 11th Baron Petre (grandfather)

Francis Loraine Petre OBE (22 February 1852 – 6 May 1925) was a British civil servant in India and a military historian upon his retirement. He wrote a two-volume regimental history of the Norfolk Regiment, but is best known for his works on the Napoleonic Wars. The grandson of the 11th Baron Petre, he was educated at Oscott College and joined the Bar in 1880. He took the civil service exam and subsequently joined the Indian Civil Service. He retired as Commissioner of Allahabad in 1900.

Subsequently, he chose a literary career, pursuing interests in the history of the Napoleonic Wars. He wrote five books on the Wars, most of which are in use a century later. His studies of Napoleon's conquest of Prussia 1806–1807 (1901) and Napoleon's Campaign in Poland, 1806–1807 (1901) were among the first such books in the English language. He also wrote several regimental histories, a study of Simon Bolivar, and a descriptive study of Colombia. World War I interrupted his literary pursuits; he served in the Finance Branch of the Ministry of Munitions. In 1920, Petre was appointed Officer of the Order of the British Empire.

== Family ==
F. Loraine Petre descended from an aristocratic English Catholic family, the House of Petre. His father, the Honourable Edmund George Petre, was born 23 June 1829 (d. 1 September 1889), in London's Marylebone district; he was the son of William Petre, 11th Baron Petre, and his second wife, Emma Agnes Howard. Edmund married Marianna Jane Kerr, born in 1831 in Midlothian (Edinburgh), Scotland, the daughter of the accountant and stock broker Lorraine M. Kerr, Esquire, They married 3 June 1851, at her home at 26 India Street in Glasgow, Lanarkshire. Edmund Petre worked as a stockbroker.

Petre was born at Netherley House, in Aberdeen, Scotland on 22 February 1852, Loraine Petre's younger sister, Rosamund Catherine, was born on 25 August 1857, at the High Elms, in Hampton Court (now Hampton, London). She married in 1884 to William Henry Hare Hedges-White, an Irish Peer, the fourth and last Earl of Bantry. Petre maintained his connections to his illustrious family; in 1873, his cousin married George Forbes, 7th Earl of Granard, and he was listed as a guest.

In 1887, Petre married Maud Ellen Rawlinson, the daughter of a clergyman; their son, Roderic L(oraine), born 1888 in Indore, India; Roderick attended school near Midsomer Norton and Stratton-on-the-Fosse, where he sang treble in the boys choir. Roderick served in the South Wales Borderers in the Gallipoli campaign of World War I, and was awarded the Military Cross. Eventually he achieved the rank of major-general. A daughter, Enid, was born in 1890, and a second daughter was born in 1894 and died the same year.

== Education and career ==
Petre was educated at Oscott College, and called to the Bar by Lincoln's Inn in 1873. The next year he competed in the examinations for the Indian Civil Service, in which he was placed fourth of the top thirty. Initially he served in the North-Western Provinces, and later in Oudh. From 1885 to 1889, he was at Hyderabad, in the Political Department. He also served in the Secretariat of the Indian Board of Revenue. Upon his retirement in 1900, he was Commissioner of Allahabad.

While serving in India, he published several articles on Indian politics and culture, and on the progress of the central states of India. In 1888, his article on "Progress and Prospects of Native States of Central India" was published in the Asiatic Quarterly Review. After retirement, he maintained his interest in India Affairs: he regularly attended the meetings of the East India Society, a group of civil servants and military men who had served in the Far East and India, and of which he was a member of the governing council. In 1901, he presented a paper, The Indian Sectarists and their Relation to the Administration, which was published in the Imperial and Asiatic Quarterly Review. In 1907, during the civil turmoil in India, he wrote to the editor of The Times (London) to clarify the problems faced by local police forces in maintaining civil order in the Indian Provinces.

== Military historian ==
On his retirement from the Indian Civil Service, his interest in the Napoleonic Wars led him to seek out studies of the European campaigns. The lack of English language studies on the wars, particularly the campaigns of 1806 and 1807, encouraged him to write both Napoleon's Conquest of Prussia 1806 and Napoleon's campaign in Poland, 1806–1807. The latter, originally published in 1910, has been reprinted in several additions, the most recent in 2001 by Stackpole and Greenwood Press. His Napoleon's Conquest of Prussia 1806, first published in 1901, entered three editions: in 1907, by J. Lane and in 1914; its 1907 and subsequent editions contained an introduction by the Field Marshal Earl Roberts. Both of these campaigns, Petre surmised, were Napoleon's greatest achievements: never again did he organize so great a campaign, nor did his political or military power reach such heights.

Similarly, his Napoleon & the Archduke Charles; a history of the Franco-Austrian campaign in the valley of the Danube in 1809 reflected the dearth of English language material on the subject. For Petre, the campaign was of particular interest as the one of two campaigns in which Napoleon was opposed by arguably his most able continental opponent. In 1809, that opponent was the Archduke Charles, Duke of Teschen; the other campaign, in Italy 1797, that opponent was Dagobert Sigmund von Wurmser. His son Roderick assisted with the map-making. The volume entered three reprints–1916, 1976, 1989—and a second edition in 1991, reprinted in 2001, reflected the ongoing fascination with the Napoleonic wars.

Both Napoleon's last campaign in Germany, 1813 and Napoleon at Bay 1814, were translated immediately into German, and both had 1970s reprints. In Napoleon's Last Campaign, Petre posits that the Emperor Napoleon abandoned the guiding principles of his previous success, which lay in his relentless pursuit of his opponent's main army. In the Saxon Campaign, Napoleon lost sight of his primary objectives, becoming mired in secondary achievements. Petre noted also the vast increase in sheer numbers, on both sides of the contest, and predicted that in terms of numbers, "we must wait for the wars of tomorrow to see those numbers exceeded." World War I interrupted his work as a military historian; he was recalled from retirement to work in the Finance office of the Munitions Ministry. On 26 March 1920, he was appointed Officer of the Order of the British Empire.

Petre wrote a two-volume history of the Norfolk Regiment, the second volume of which was published a month before his death. In addition, he also wrote histories of the Royal Berkshire Regiment (Royal Berks), the 1st Gurkha Rifles, and the Scots Guards in the Great War 1914–1918. His regimental histories also included The 1st, King George's Own, Gurkha Rifles-The Malaun Regiment, 1815–1921.

Petre also wrote two books on South America, responding to the need for investors to find additional information in a convenient form in English. In it, he maintained, he simply collated information and in his tour of the country he remained on what he called "the beaten tracks", principal cities, and the countryside. Furthermore, he maintained, he used statistical information supplied by the President of Columbia. The book includes photographs that he took himself. His second book on South America was Simon Bolivar—El Libertador; a life of the chief leader in the revolt against Spain in Venezuela, New Granada and Peru.

== List of books ==
- Napoleon's conquest of Prussia 1806–1807, London: S. Low, 1901. OCLC: 457586317.
- Napoleon's Campaign in Poland, 1806–1807. London: John Lane, 1907. OCLC: 504519385
- Napoleon & the Archduke Charles; a history of the Franco-Austrian campaign in the valley of the Danube in 1809. London, J. Lane; New York, J. Lane Co., 1909 [1908]. OCLC: 511002.
- Napoleon's last campaign in Germany, 1813, London & New York, John Lane Co., 1912. OCLC: 3677122.
- Napoleon at bay 1814. New York, John Lane Co., 1914. OCLC: 503529 and OCLC: 252434389.

== See also ==
- Ramsay Weston Phipps
- Charles Oman
