= Curlethney Hill =

Landform in Aberdeenshire, Scotland

Coordinates: 57.0167°N 2.2666°W

Curlethney Hill is a landform in Aberdeenshire, Scotland within the Mounth Range of the Grampian Mountains. (Grid Reference NO 918 839) The peak elevation of this mountain is 246 metres above mean sea level. This landform lies slightly southwest of the village of Netherley. The northwest boundary of the moorland atop Curlethney Hill is formed by the southwestern flanks of Craggie Cat, a nearby peak.

== Geology and hydrology ==
This mountain is covered virtually entirely with moorland. Curlethney Hill is situated approximately 0.9 kilometers to the east of Meikle Carewe Hill; surface runoff and drainage from the northern and eastern slopes of Curlethney Hill flows north to Crynoch Burn, at reaches above the Red Moss. Waters within the Red Moss are decidedly acidic, with measured summer pH values in the range of 5.67. These low pH levels may be caused in part by the peat drainage from the moorland on Meikle Carewe Hill and Curlethney Hill. The southwest flanks of Curlethney Hill drain to Cowton Burn, a tributary of the Cowie Water.

== Wind farm proposal ==
Renewable Energy Resources has an application pending before the Aberdeenshire Council to create a windfarm for electrical power generation using Curlethney Hill, Meikle Carewe Hill and nearby high ground to install 12 wind turbines, four of which are proposed for Curlethney Hill itself, and two others to be in the saddle areas on either side of Curlethney Hill. Each turbine would reach a height of 70 metres above grade level, and the entire complex could generate enough power to supply the equivalent of 5000 homes. Environmental concerns over the proposal include noise pollution, visual impact and ecological disturbance.

== See also ==
- Raedykes
