= Meikle Carewe Hill =

Landform in Aberdeenshire, Scotland

Coordinates: 57.0188°N 2.2853°W

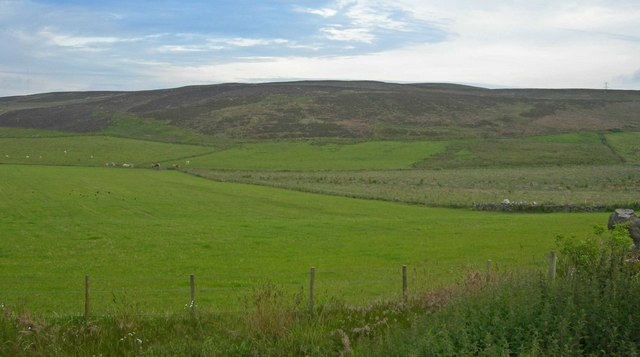
Meikle Carewe Hill. Author: C. Michael Hogan

Meikle Carewe Hill is a landform in Aberdeenshire, Scotland within the Mounth Range of the Grampian Mountains. (Grid Reference NO 921 828) The peak elevation of this mountain is 266 metres above mean sea level. Meikle Carewe is a prominent landform visible from a number of coastal hills such as Kempstone Hill and Megray Hill; it also forms a major backdrop to the community of Netherley.

== Geology and hydrology ==
This mountain is covered virtually entirely with moorland. Its northwestern slopes drain to the Cairnie Burn, whilst the northern and eastern slopes drain to Crynoch Burn. The western slopes yield surface runoff that drains into Cowton Burn. Curlethney Hill is situated approximately 0.9 kilometers to the east of Meikle Carewe Hill Surface runoff and drainage from Curlethney Hill also drain north to Crynoch Burn, at reaches above the Red Moss. Waters within the Red Moss are decidedly acidic, with measured summer pH values in the range of 5.68. These low pH levels may be caused in part by the peat drainage from the moorland on Meikle Carewe Hill.

== Wind farm proposal ==
Renewable Energy Systems (RES UK & Ireland Ltd) is to construct a windfarm for electrical power generation using Meikle Carewe Hill and nearby high ground to install twelve wind turbines, five of which are proposed for Meikle Carewe Hill itself. Each turbine would reach a height of 70 metres above grade level, and the entire complex could generate enough power to supply the equivalent of 5000 homes.

The planning application for the development was originally rejected by Aberdeenshire Council but was overturned on appeal on 24 February 2011. Environmental concerns over the proposal include noise pollution, visual impact and ecological disturbance.

== See also ==
- Elsick Mounth
- Raedykes
