= Kintore Town House =

Municipal building in Kintore, Scotland

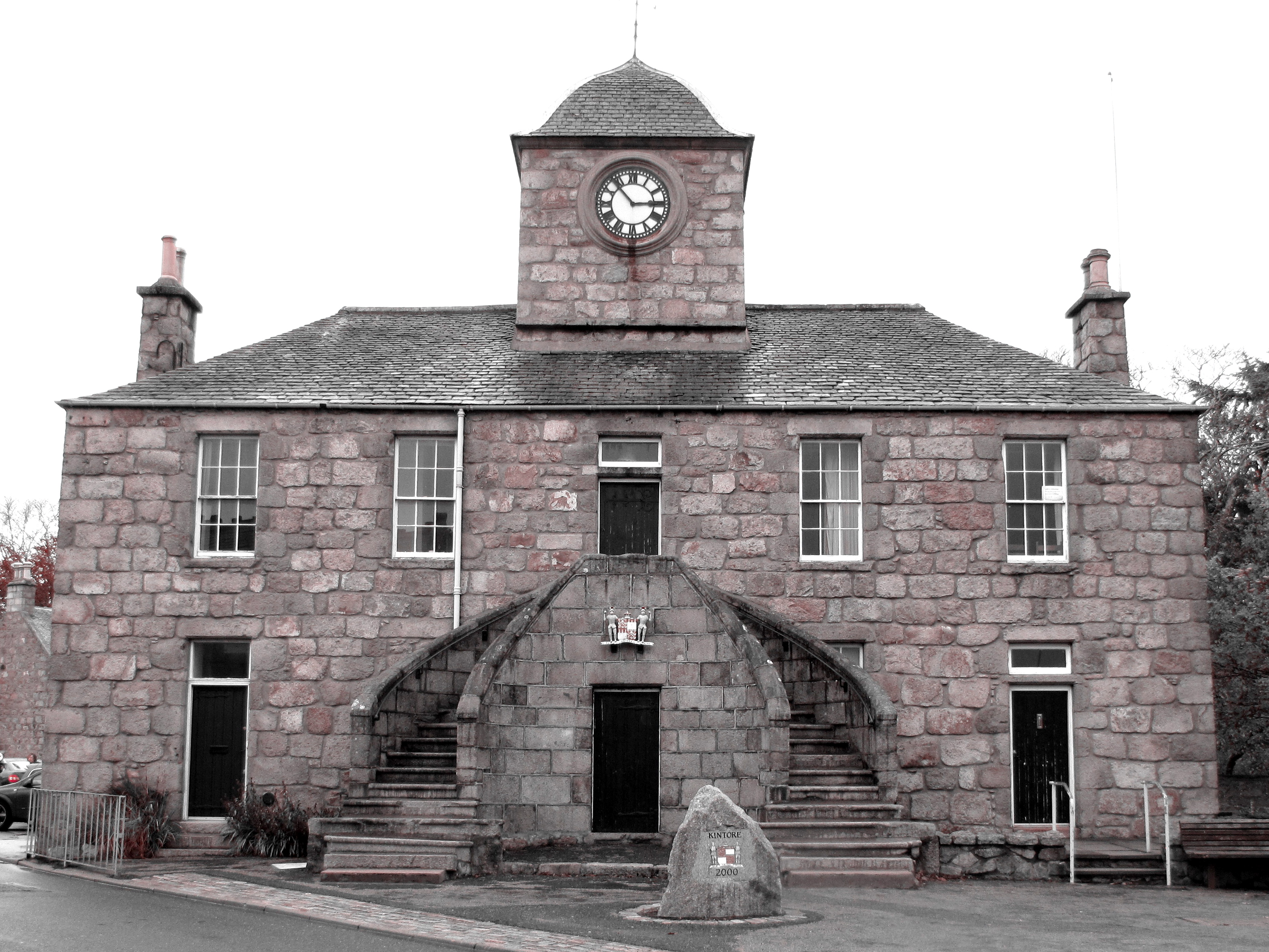
- Kintore Town House

- Shown in Aberdeenshire
- 57.2371°N 2.3457°W
- Location: The Square, Kintore

History
- Built: 1747

Site notes
- Architectural style: Scottish medieval style

Listed Building – Category A
- Official name: Kintore Town House, The Square
- Designated: 24 November 1972
- Reference no.: LB36312

Kintore Town House is a municipal structure in The Square, Kintore, Aberdeenshire, Scotland. The structure, which is used as commercial offices, is a Category A listed building.

== History ==
The building was commissioned by John Keith, 3rd Earl of Kintore, whose seat was at Keith Hall, in 1737. He had been elected as provost of Kintore the previous year and this building was his gift to the town. It was designed in the Scottish medieval style, built in coursed granite and was completed in 1747.

The design involved a symmetrical main frontage with five bays facing onto The Square; the main frontage featured a sweeping semi-circular double forestair which led up to a central doorway with a rectangular fanlight on the first floor. The stairway encased another doorway, which was surmounted by the coat of arms of the Earl of Kintore, on the ground floor, and was flanked by further doorways on either side. The other bays on the first floor were fenestrated by 12-pane sash windows with window cills. At roof level, there was a hip roof with a central square tower with an ogee-shaped roof. The ogee-shaped roof recalled the style used in the design of Keith Hall.

Internally, the principal rooms were a prison cell with a vaulted ceiling for petty criminals on the ground floor, and a council chamber for meetings of the burgh council on the east side of the first floor. Other rooms included a small shop, a schoolroom and a store to hold agricultural produce deposited by tenant farmers who chose to pay their rent in kind.

A clock was made by Hugh Gordon of Aberdeen, paid for by George Keith, 10th Earl Marischal, whose seat was at Inverugie Castle, and was installed in the tower in 1774. A northwest facing wing was added at the back of the building shortly after the clock was added. The building continued to serve as the meeting place of the burgh council throughout the 19th century and for much of the 20th century, but ceased to be the local seat of government when the enlarged Gordon District Council was formed in 1975. The building was subsequently converted for use as commercial offices.

In December 2021, a local charity, Action Kintore, submitted a planning application for proposals developed by architects, Lippe, to convert the building into a community hub. The proposals involved a café on the ground floor and an assembly room for community events on the first floor. Aberdeenshire Council gave planning consent for the proposals, allowing Action Kintore, to start seeking finance for the project, in May 2022. Action Kintore estimated that the project would cost circa £1 million to implement.

== See also ==
- List of listed buildings in Kintore, Aberdeenshire
- List of Category A listed buildings in Aberdeenshire
