= Crynoch Burn =

Stream in Aberdeenshire, Scotland

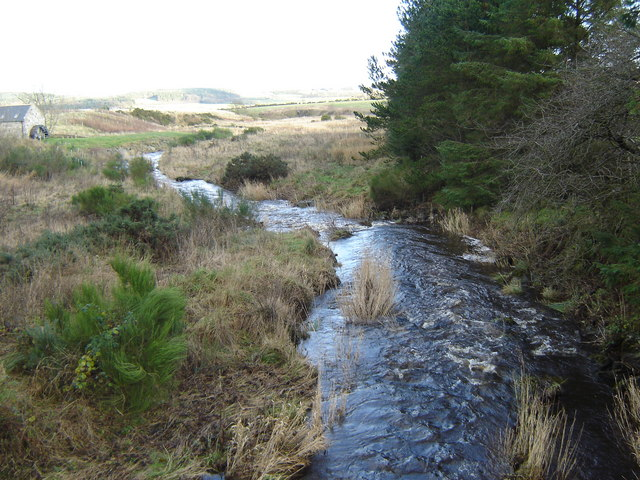
- Crynoch Burn

Location
- Country: Scotland

Physical characteristics
- Source: Nearby Netherley
- Mouth: River Dee
  - coordinates: 57.09383°N 2.23660°W

Crynoch Burn is a stream in Aberdeenshire that is a tributary to the River Dee. This stream rises somewhat above Netherley and flows near Netherley House; and thence into the Red Moss, a significant natural bog habitat; thence near the historic Lairhillock Inn; and finally by the village of Maryculter and through Oldman Wood before discharge to the Dee. Headwaters areas include the northern and western slopes of Meikle Carewe Hill and the northern slopes of Curlethney Hill.

The soils near its mouth at the River Dee are light and sandy, and the pH level of these greenish brown waters is approximately 8.05, or slightly alkaline.

== Hydrology ==
Tributaries to the Crynoch Burn include the Cairnie Burn. Classified in the Strahler Stream Order system the Crynoch Burn is a second order stream.
