= Ythan Wells =

Glenmailen, Ythan Wells
- Aberdeenshire, Scotland, UK

Location
- Location in Scotland
- Coordinates: 57.432432°N 2.576164°W
- Grid reference: NJ655382

Scheduled monument
- Official name: Ythan Wells, Roman camps
- Type: Roman: camp
- Designated: 30 April 1964
- Reference no.: SM2415

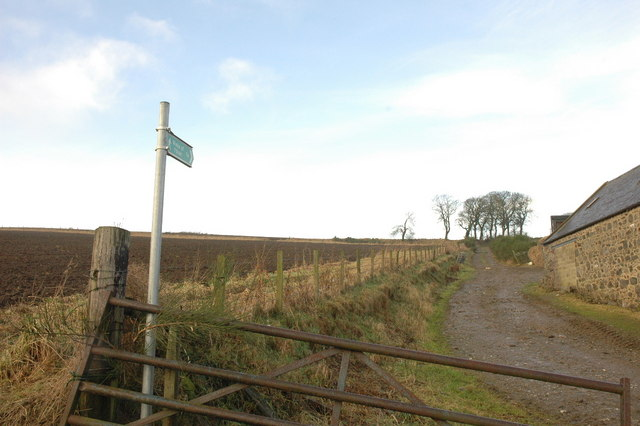
Public footpath to Wells of Ythan

Ythan Wells, also known as Glenmailen, is the site of a Roman military camp, near the farm of Glenmellan, 2.1 kilometres (1.3 mi) east of the village of Ythanwells in Aberdeenshire, Scotland. The site is a designated scheduled monument.

Traces of two marching camps have been found at the site. The larger camp, covering some 42 hectares (100 acres) was discovered in 1785 by Col. Alex Shand. A smaller camp, extending to 13 hectares (32 acres) and partially overlapping the area of the first, was discovered by J. K. St Joseph in 1968. This smaller camp predates the larger and has been dated to the campaigns of Agricola.

The site is situated at the headwaters of the River Ythan, where a series of natural springs supplies potable water, that was convenient for the large marching camp installed here by the Romans in the first few centuries AD.

The Roman legions established a chain of very large forts at Ardoch, Strageath, Inchtuthil, Battledykes, Stracathro and Raedykes, taking the Elsick Mounth on the way to Normandykes, thence proceeding to the northerly camps of Deers Den and Glenmailen.

== National importance ==
Ythan Wells supports scholars' attempts to understand Roman camps, especially their construction, and how they were organized, used and designed. It also gives clues about how these changed their design over time.

"And their distribution and relationship with each other and with other broadly contemporary monuments in the landscape. This monument can also inform our understanding of the daily lives of Roman soldiers and enhance knowledge of the impact of Roman campaigns on local Iron Age communities and the landscape. The monument at Ythan Wells is particularly valuable because it comprises two superimposed camps of different size and type, and because it is among the northernmost of the Roman camps in Scotland: Ythan Wells I appears to be one of a linear group of particularly large camps in NE Scotland. This camp is also important because part of the defences survive as an upstanding earthwork, indicating high potential for the preservation of important remains, including artefacts and ecofacts. Ythan Wells I was documented by antiquarians in the 18th century, which adds to the understanding of this camp. If this monument were to be lost or damaged, our understanding of Roman camps and our knowledge of Roman military structure and logistics would be significantly diminished."

== See also ==
- Cawdor (Roman Fort)
- Pennymuir Roman camps
- Muiryfold
