= Cowton Burn =

Stream in Aberdeenshire, Scotland

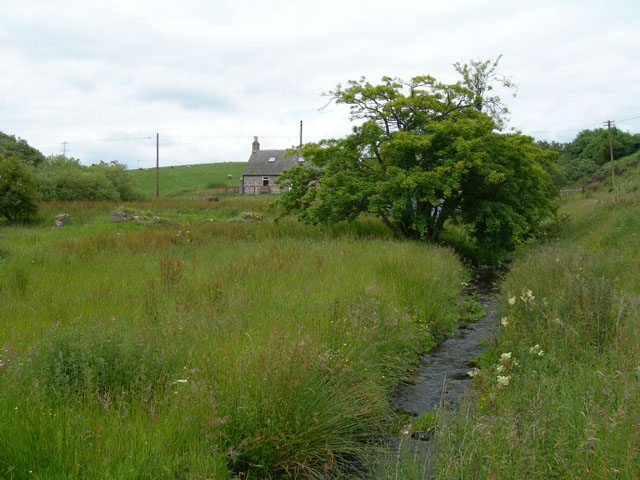
- Cowton Burn

Location
- Country: Scotland

Physical characteristics
- Source: Mounth (eastern Grampian Mountains)
- Mouth: Cowie Water
  - coordinates: 56.98961°N 2.26636°W

Cowton Burn is a stream that rises in the Mounth, or eastern range of the Grampian Mountains, on some of the northwest slopes of the Durris Forest west of Netherley, Aberdeenshire, Scotland. The Grid Reference for the headwaters is NO 925 823); Cowton Burn is a tributary to the Cowie Water. The Cowton Burn is crossed by the A957 road slightly northwest of Rickarton House.

== Watershed characteristics ==
The headwaters of the Cowton Burn rise in a coniferous forest area of the Durris Forest. The stream flows downslope on an easterly course as it makes its way to discharge to the Cowie Water. The stream generally has lush vegetation growing all the way to its margins throughout most of its course. The July flow rate is roughly six cubic feet per second in the headwaters reach. pH levels are slightly alkaline.

== History ==
The Roman Camp Raedykes occupied the northern higher ground of the central drainage area of Cowton Burn, whereas the east flank of Raedykes provides surface runoff to the Burn of Monboys. A number of historical analysts, including the 19th century researcher Gabriel Jaques Surenne and contemporary authors Watt and Hogan, hypothesize that the Battle of Mons Graupius was fought in or slightly east of Cowton Burn watershed. Immediately above the confluence with the Cowie Water, one can look down and see expanses of Fetteresso Forest to the west, at the edge of which is the Rickarton House estate, founded by Colonel William Rickart Hepburn in the first decade of the 19th century.

== See also ==
- Burn of Muchalls
- Muchalls Castle
