= George Silver (agriculturalist) =

George Silver was a Scottish agricultural innovator, in Kincardineshire, who flourished in the early nineteenth century.

Silver was born in Netherley. He was the son of Alexander Silver, who made his fortune with the East India Trading Company. Alexander Silver built the Netherley House mansion in Netherley and died there in 1797. George Silver esq. innovated in land cultivation, grain production and cattle breeding. By 1841 he had purchased the lands of nearby Muchalls Castle.

== See also ==
- Red Moss, Aberdeenshire
