= The Den and the Glen =

Park in Aberdeenshire, Scotland

Coordinates: 57.0858°N 2.2308°W

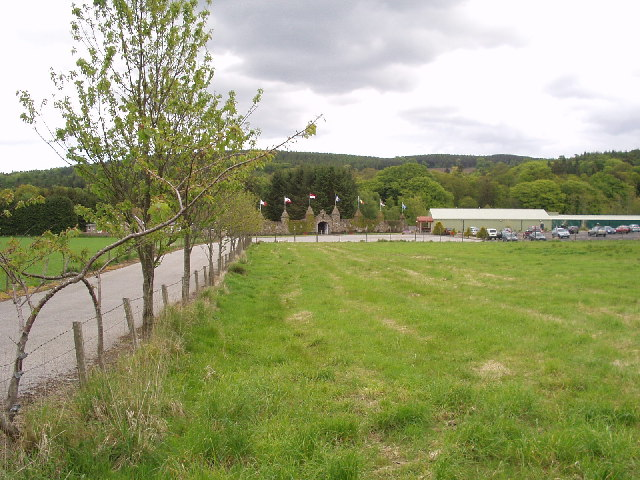
Looking towards Storybook Glen

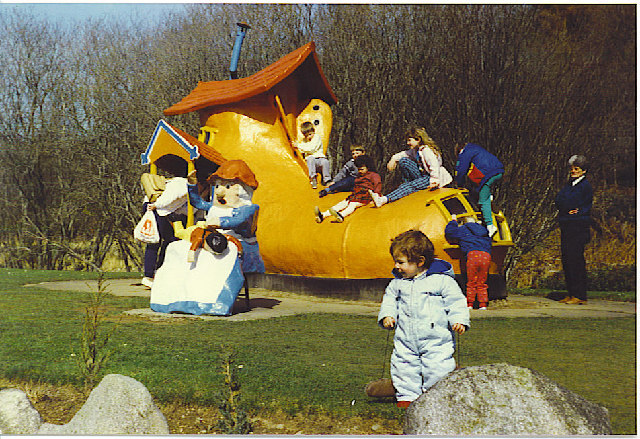
Storybook Glen

The Den and the Glen (formerly known as Storybook Glen) is a children's park in Maryculter, Scotland, near the city of Aberdeen, which opened in 1984.

The park features outdoor play areas and sculptural displays depicting characters from fairy tales, nursery rhymes, and popular children’s television and film franchises. A statue of Barney the Dinosaur became the subject of an internet meme in the late 2010s. The site also includes painted murals and cut-out boards based on well-known fictional characters.

== History ==
The park was opened by five year-old girl Kate Reid on 26 May 1984 under the name Storybook Glen as a children’s attraction themed around fairy tales and nursery rhymes, developed in the early 1980s on land used by the owning family for rose growing.

== Features ==
The park contains a range of outdoor displays and play areas featuring fibreglass sculptures and settings inspired by fairy tales, nursery rhymes, and children’s television characters.
