= Hallforest Castle =

14th-century fortified tower in Kintore, Aberdeenshire, Scotland

Coordinates: 57.2290°N 2.3706°W

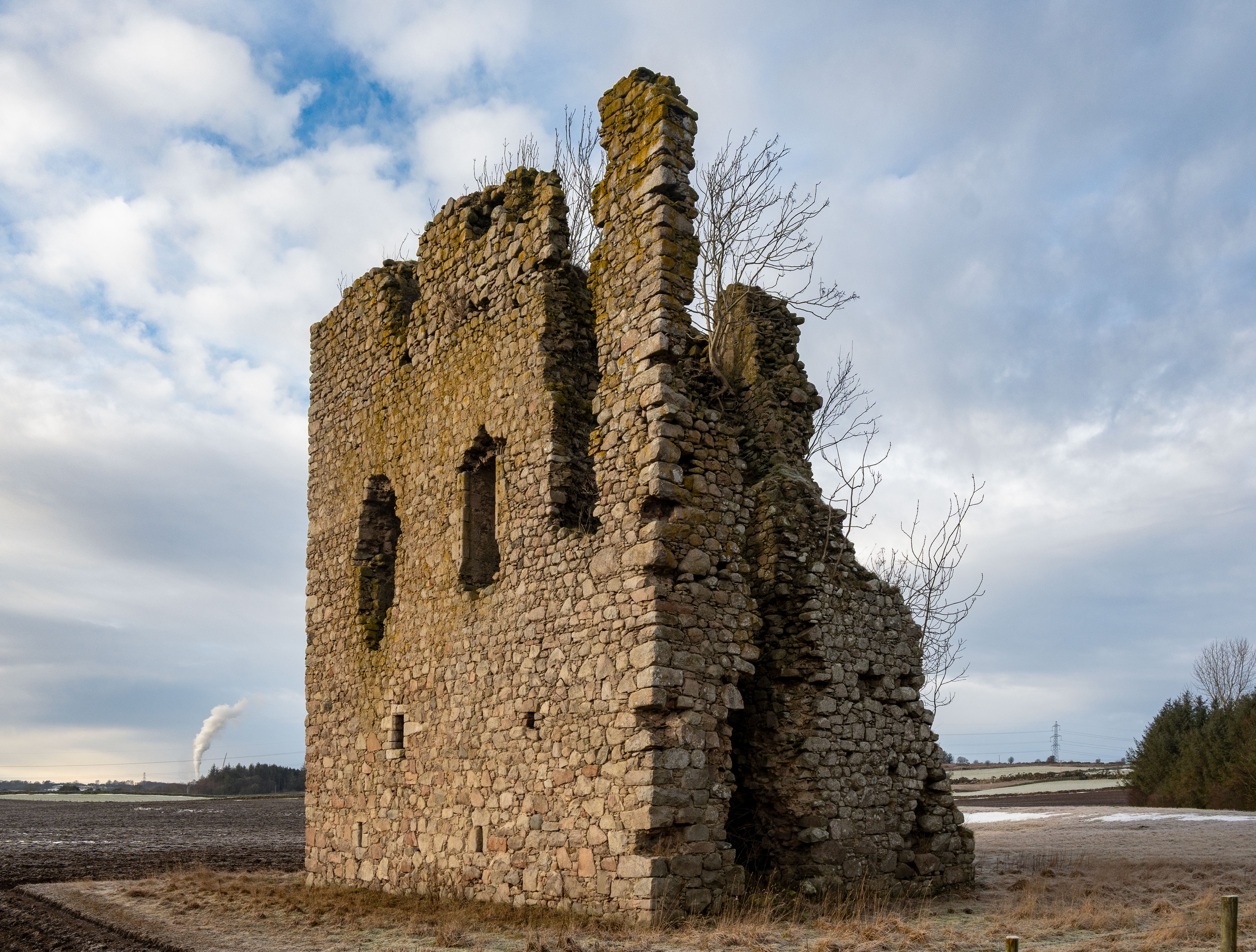
Hallforest Castle

Hallforest Castle is a keep, one of the oldest in Scotland, as it dates from the 14th century. It is about a mile and a half from Kintore, in Aberdeenshire.

Alternative names are Castle of Hallforrest, Hall Forest Castle or simply Hallforrest.

== History ==
The castle is believed to have been built by Robert the Bruce as a hunting lodge; he is said to have granted it to Robert II Keith, Marischal of Scotland, the predecessor of the Earls of Kintore. Mary, Queen of Scots visited Hallforrest in 1562.

The castle was frequently attacked during the 17th-century wars. It may have been abandoned shortly afterward, although it remains the property of the Earls of Kintore.

== Structure ==
Hallforrest is a plain oblong tower 48 feet (15 m) long and 36 feet (11 m) wide. It once had a parapet, and probably a stone roof resting on an upper arch. It had two vaults, divided by entresol floors. It seems that the entrance led to the first entresol floor. There are small gun loops to the basement, which may have had a cattle door.

Originally the castle had six floors, while its walls were 7 feet (2.1 m) thick. There are windows on the south. There is no evidence of masonry stairs; ladders and hatches must have been used. The interior is now ruinous.

To the north there are traces of what may have been an enclosing wall, and to the north-west traces of a possible ditch or moat.

It is a category B listed building.
