= Auchinhove =

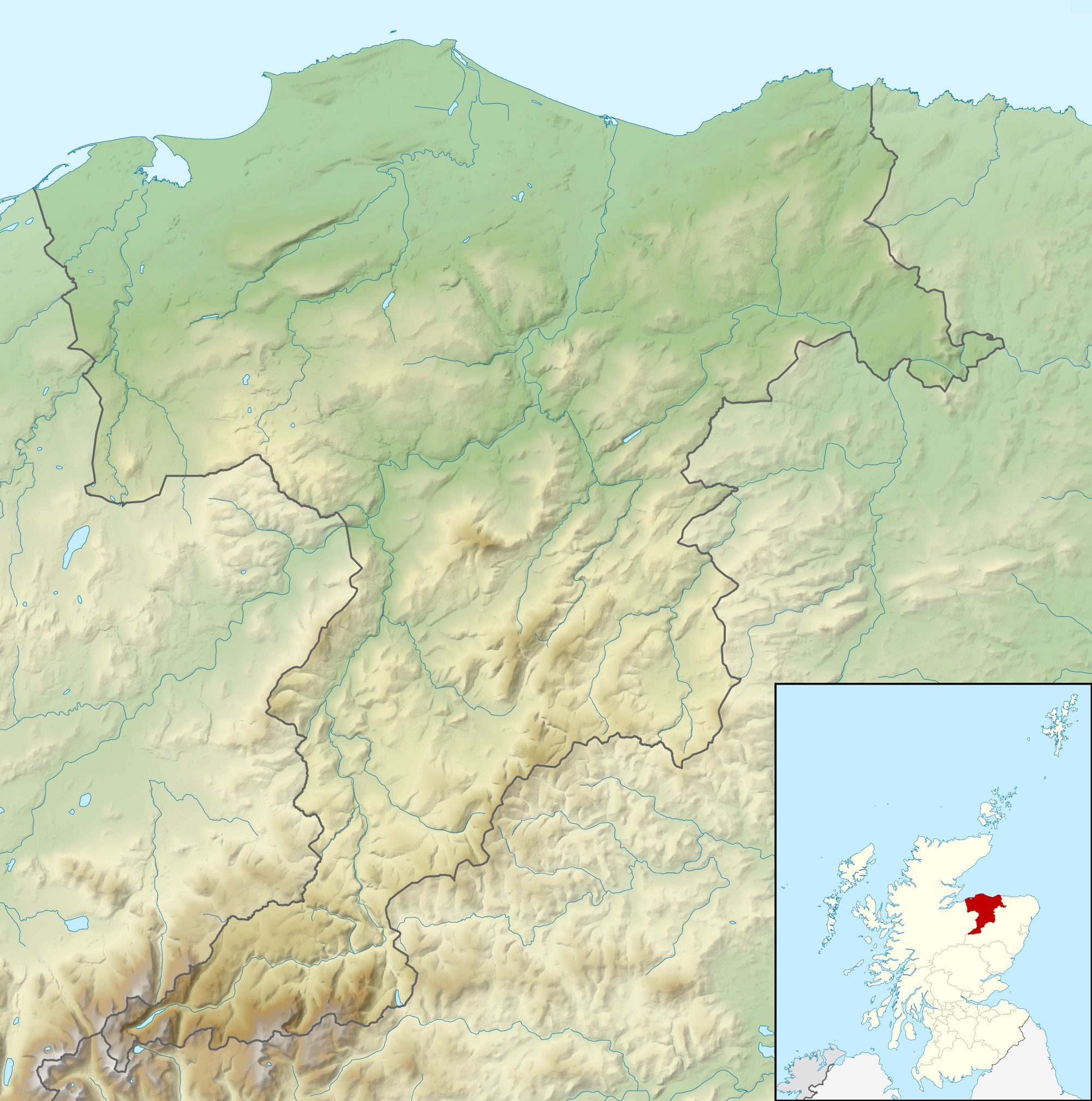
- Location within Moray
- 57.5527°N 2.9007°W
- Type: Marching camp

Site notes
- Archaeologists: Kenneth St Joseph
- Discovered: 1949
- Condition: Cropmark

Auchinhove, located to the east of Keith in Moray, Scotland, is the site of a Roman marching camp, first discovered by aerial photography in 1949.

The camp measures 337 metres (1,106 ft) by 328 metres (1,076 ft) covering an area of approximately 10.9 hectares (27 acres).

== Bibliography ==
- "Auchinhove". Canmore. Royal Commission on the Ancient and Historical Monuments of Scotland.
- "Auchinhove". Moray Sites and Monuments Record. Moray Council.
