= Cawdor (Roman fort) =

Archaeological site in Scotland

Coordinates: 57.5098°N 3.9868°W

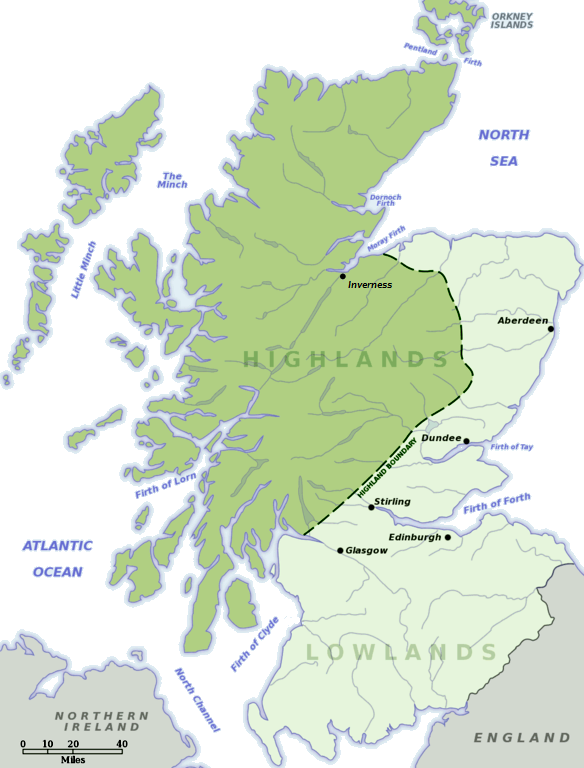
Cawdor Roman Fort is near Inverness, exactly at the top northern limit of the "Lowlands"

Cawdor (Roman Fort), located near the small village of Easter Galcantray (15 miles or 24 kilometres east of Inverness), was suspected of being one of the northernmost Roman forts in Great Britain, although no evidence of Roman occupation has been found to date.

== Discovery ==
In 1984 cropmarks were identified at Easter Galcantray, south west of Cawdor, by aerial photography. The site was described as being on the "south bank of river Nairn, straight cropmark with gap in middle and suggestion of two more sides, truncated by river, at right angles to main mark.".

Excavations between 1985 and 1990 uncovered a ditch, post holes, a corner tower and a few pottery fragments. Studies of the pottery identified it as medieval.

The possibility that the site may have been a Roman fort in Caledonia (as Scotland was called by Romans) was raised. Although no Roman pottery or artefacts were found, several features were identified that seemed supportive of this classification:

Jones (1986a) interpreted the main structural phase within the (Cawdor) site’s history as potential evidence for the presence of a Roman military work. This assumption was based on a number of salient factors. These include: the rectilinear form of the enclosure ditch, with its V-shaped profile; the associated timber gate and corner tower; the presence of possible contemporary rectilinear timber buildings, which appear reminiscent in both size and form to barrack blocks; and finally, the dating evidence. This, based on the one sigma calibrated range, suggests the slighting of the site during the late first century AD, which would correspond to the governorship of Agricola, or possibly his unknown successor.

In mid-83 AD Agricola defeated the armies of the Caledonians, led by Calgacus, at the Battle of Mons Graupius. With this big victory, Agricola extracted hostages from the Caledonian tribes and instructed his fleet to sail around the north coast confirming to the Romans the province of Britannia was an island.

Agricola then may have marched his army to the northern coast of Scotland.

However, Romano-British scholars have been reticent in confirming Jones' interpretation. Maxwell and Wilson wrote: "For the present, it may be noted that, viewed as crop-mark sites, neither [Cawdor nor Thomshill] sits happily in the established morphological categories of standard Roman military installations in North Britain". David Breeze added that "the suggested Roman context for the sites at Easter Galcantray [Cawdor] and Thoms Hill - Daniels 1986 and Jones 1986 - fails to convince; most of the evidence from the former site would better sit within a medieval context". William Hanson concluded that "none of the postulated sites discovered by aerial survey in Moray and Nairn over recent years has the distinctive morphological characteristics of a Roman fort".

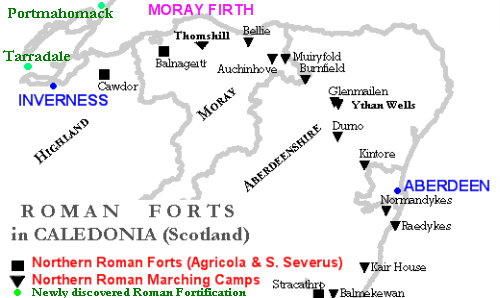
Actual and possible Roman camp sites in the northeast of Caledonia

Radiocarbon tests of material recovered from the site gave possible dates of construction during Agricola's first century campaign, but its interpretation remains problematic because the site was occupied and abandoned quite quickly leaving no other evidence.

== See also ==
- Scotland during the Roman Empire
- Inchtuthil
- Deers Den
- Normandykes

== Bibliography ==
- Di Martino, Vittorio (2003). Roman Ireland. Collins Press: London.
- Jones and Keillar (1986). Excavations at Cawdor. University of Manchester.
- Hanson, William S. (2003). Edwards, Kevin J.; Ralston, Ian B.M. (eds.). "The Roman Presence: Brief Interludes". Scotland After the Ice Age: Environment, Archaeology and History, 8000 BC - AD 1000. Edinburgh University Press.
- Hanson, William S. (1980). "Roman campaigns north of the Forth-Clyde isthmus: the evidence of the temporary camps". Proceedings of the Society of Antiquaries of Scotland. 109: 142–145. doi:10.9750/PSAS.109.140.150. S2CID 145027106.
- Macdonald, G (1916). "The Roman camps at Raedykes and Glenmailen". Proceedings of the Society of Antiquaries of Scotland. 50: 348–359. doi:10.9750/PSAS.050.317.359. S2CID 191748336.
- Maxwell, G S (1980). "Agricola's campaigns: the evidence of the temporary camps". Scottish Archeological Forum. 12: 34–41.
- Moffat, Alistair (2005). Before Scotland: The Story of Scotland Before History. Thames & Hudson: London. ISBN 0-500-05133-X.
- Pitts, L (1985). Inchtuthil. The Roman Legionary Fortress (6 ed.). Britannia Monograph.
- Robertson, A S (1976). "Agricola's campaigns in Scotland, and their aftermath". Scottish Archeological Forum. 74.
- Joseph, J K (1951). "Air reconnaissance of North Britain". The Journal of Roman Studies. 41: 65. doi:10.2307/298099. JSTOR 298099.
- Woolliscroft, D; Hoffmann, B (2006). The First Frontier. Rome in the North of Scotland. Tempus: Stroud.
