= Oldman Wood =

Wood in Scotland

Coordinates: 57°4′50″N 2°13′52″W

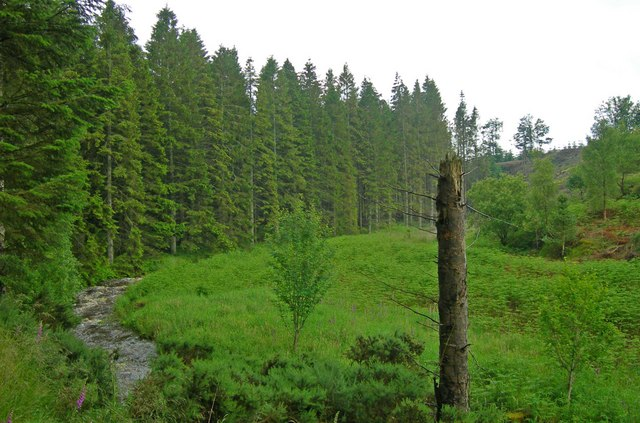
Crynoch Burn flowing through Oldman Wood.

Oldman Wood is a publicly owned forest in Kincardineshire, Scotland.

Crynoch Burn, a tributary of the River Dee, flows through the Oldman Wood.
