= Netherley House =

House in Aberdeenshire, Scotland

Coordinates: 57°02′N 2°15′W

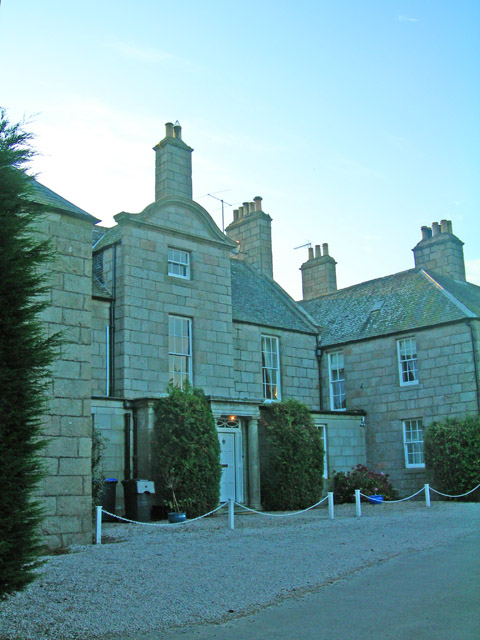
The Netherly House

Netherley House is a mansion built by Alexander Silver in the late 18th century in Netherley, Aberdeenshire, Scotland. It is situated near the northerly flowing drainage of Crynoch Burn (Groome, 1885). The home was sold to Horatio Ross by James Silver, son of George Silver in 1853 for 33,000 pounds sterling. (Peter, 1856). It subsequently came into the possession of the descendants of General Nathaniel Forbes of Auchernach, who held it until 1901.

George Silver was the son and heir of Alexander Silver. While George Silver inhabited Netherley House, he acquired the further lands of Muchalls Castle.
