= Deer's Den =

Archaeological site at Kintore, Aberdeenshire, Scotland

Coordinates: 57°14′08″N 2°21′17″W

Designations

Scheduled monument
- Official name: Deer's Den, roundhouses
- Type: Prehistoric domestic and defensive: hut circle, roundhouse
- Designated: 30 March 2009
- Reference no.: SM12465

Deer's Den is an archaeological site at Kintore, Scotland in Aberdeenshire. The site has mesolithic remains, Iron Age artefacts and is a known Roman Camp.

== History ==
The area includes evidence of settlement dating back to the Bronze Age, with at least seven roundhouses, likely to date from the Iron Age, up to the time of the Roman Empire. Subsequently, the area would have been used as a Roman marching camp, and has associations with the Severan invasion, ca 200 CE. The marching camp would have been large enough for 10,000 troops to rest. Excavations in the area have found 44 bread ovens and 20 separate buildings over the area.

The excavation of 44 bread ovens is the largest number of Roman bread ovens found in one location in the UK. They would have been open flat breads topped with vegetables, similar to modern pizzas.

The archaeological discoveries of the area came about due to a proposed housing development in about 2003. The roundhouses became scheduled monuments on 30 March 2009, under Historic Environment Scotland.

== Location and features ==
There are ring ditch houses in the area, dating to the Bronze age, somewhere in the range of 1600 - 700 BCE.

The scheduled monument roundhouses are located near the A96 road, to the west of the River Don. They are not directly visible, but instead show through cropmarks visible from the air. Two further roundhouses were likely demolished by the creation of the A96. It is likely there are burial grounds nearby. The site covers a total of 120 acres (49 ha) site is partially disturbed and developed by the western part of Kintore itself.

== See also ==
- Normandykes
- Ythan Wells
