= Kenneth St Joseph =

English archaeologist (1912–1994)

John Kenneth Sinclair St Joseph
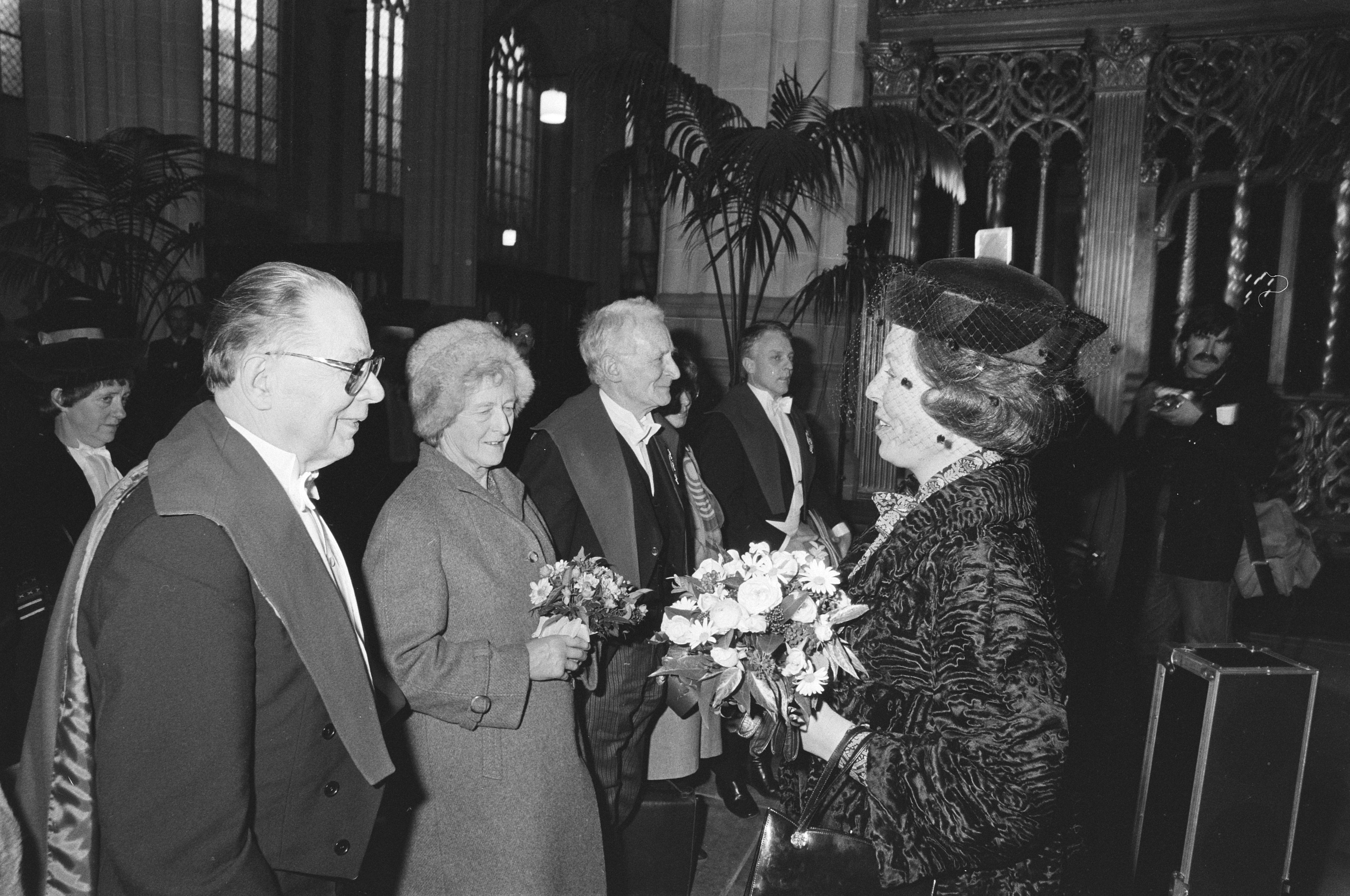
- St Joseph (centre) receiving an honorary doctorate in Amsterdam (1982)
- Born: 13 November 1912; Cookley, Worcestershire
- Died: 11 March 1994 (aged 81); Cambridge
- Occupation: Academic
- Known for: Aerial photography pioneer

John Kenneth Sinclair St Joseph, CBE, FBA, FSA, FSA Scot, FGS (13 November 1912 – 11 March 1994) was an English archaeologist, geologist and Royal Air Force (RAF) veteran who pioneered the use of aerial photography as a method of archaeological research in Britain and Ireland. He was Professor of Aerial Photographic Studies at the University of Cambridge from 1973 to 1980.

== Early life ==
Kenneth St Joseph was born in Cookley, Worcestershire, on 13 November 1912 and attended school at Bromsgrove. He studied geology at Cambridge University and graduated in 1934. He was appointed as a lecturer in geology at Cambridge in 1937 after completing his post graduate degree. During the Second World War he served as an intelligence analyst with the RAF looking at photographs of bombing operations to judge their effectiveness.

== Aerial photography ==
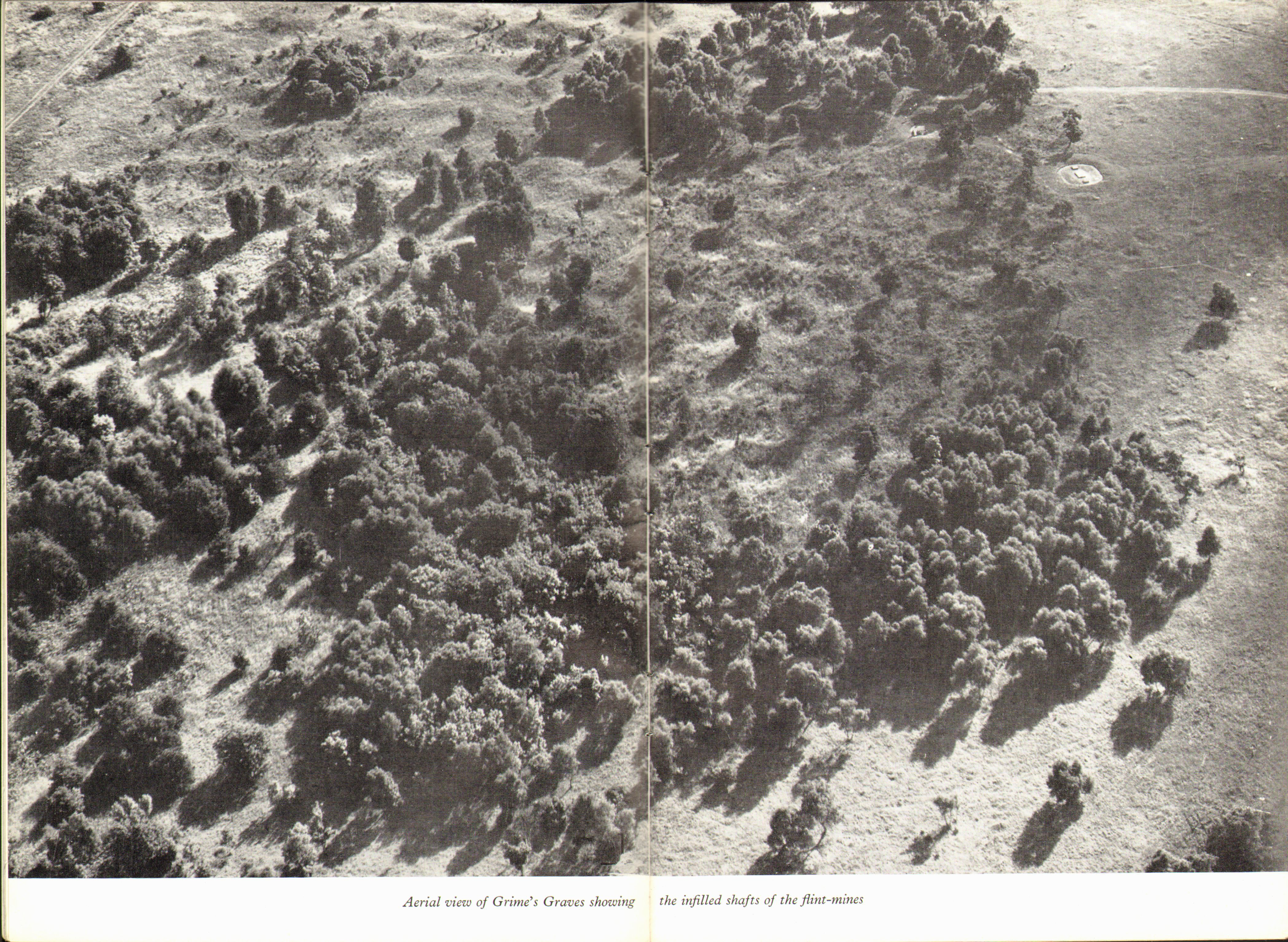
Aerial photograph of Grime's Graves, a Neolithic flint-mining site in Norfolk

As a school boy, St Joseph had been interested in Roman Britain and, in the 1930s, he was able to exploit a family connection to take part in an excavation at Hadrian's Wall where he met O G S Crawford. From this meeting, St Joseph developed an interest in aerial photography. St Joseph's subsequent war time experience convinced him that aerial photography had a potentially vital role in discovering and analyzing archaeological sites. In 1948, he was appointed curator (and subsequently, director) of aerial photography at Cambridge University. Initially, he was able to persuade the RAF to take photographs for him without charge. When the RAF became unwilling to continue this programme, the university authorities hired an aircraft. In 1965, they bought a Cessna Skymaster 337 and employed a pilot, allowing for a systematic and extensive programme of aerial archaeology. This aircraft remained in use for forty years.

Numerous new and important sites were discovered as a result of these surveys including Mucking, which was photographed on 16 June 1959. This discovery resulted in a major excavation lasting 13 years. His interest in Roman Britain continued, and the aerial survey work discovered more than 200 previously unknown Roman forts.

Some of the results of these photographic surveys were published in a series of books, the first of which - Monastic sites from the air - included text annotating the photos from David Knowles, Professor of Medieval History, who had been an influential supporter of St Joseph's appointment. The collection is now housed in the Cambridge University Unit for Landscape Modelling which is the new name for the Aerial Photography unit.

== Academic career ==
St Joseph was appointed as a lecturer in Natural Sciences at Selwyn College, Cambridge, in 1939 and held this post until 1962. He was a tutor from 1945 and librarian from 1946. Between 1974 and 1980 he was Vice-Master. He was appointed curator in Aerial Photography by the university in 1948 and Director from 1962 to 1980.

From 1973 to 1980, St Joseph was Professor of Aerial Photographic Studies (a personal chair) at the University of Cambridge. In 1982 he was awarded with an honorary doctorate degree of the University of Amsterdam. He was a member of the Council for British Archaeology for 50 years from 1944.

== Personal life ==
In 1945, he married Daphne March and they had two sons and two daughters. He was appointed a CBE in 1979. He died at Histon, near Cambridge, on 11 March 1994.

== Honours ==
St Joseph was elected a Fellow of the Geological Society (FGS) in 1937. He was elected a Fellow of the Society of Antiquaries of Scotland (FSA Scot) in 1940 and a Fellow of the Society of Antiquaries of London (FSA) in 1944. In 1978, he was elected a Fellow of the British Academy (FBA), the United Kingdom's national academy for the humanities and social sciences.

In the 1964 Queen's Birthday Honours, St Joseph was appointed an Officer of the Order of the British Empire (OBE) for services to archaeology. In the 1979 Queen's Birthday Honours, he was promoted to Commander of the Order of the British Empire (CBE) in recognition of his work as Professor of Aerial Photographic Studies at the University of Cambridge.

== Books ==
His research was published in books and articles under the name J. K. S. St Joseph.

- Knowles, David & St. Joseph, J. K. S. (1952). Monastic sites from the air. Cambridge University Press.
- Beresford M & St Joseph J K. (1958). Medieval England an Aerial Survey
- Norman, E. R., & St Joseph, J. K. S. (1969). The early development of Irish society. Cambridge University Press.
- St Joseph, J. K. S. (1977). Uses of air photography. Prometheus Books.
- S.S.Frere & J.K.St.Joseph (1983) Roman Britain from the Air Cambridge University Press.

== See also ==
- Yeavering
- Aerial survey
