= Balbridie =

Archaeological site in Aberdeenshire, Scotland

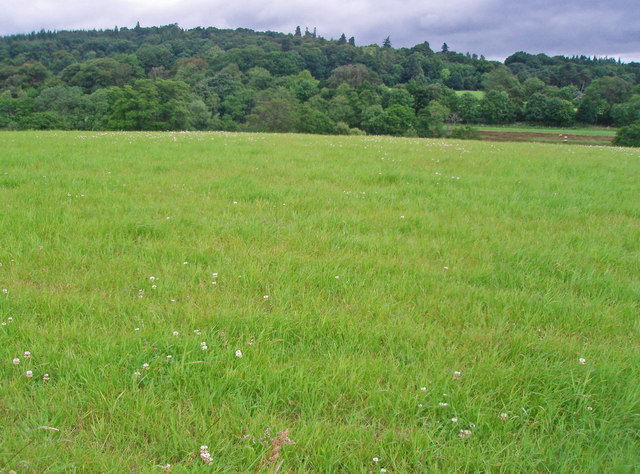
- Balbridie archaeological site
- Interactive map of Balbridie
- 57.05356°N 2.44325°W
- Type: Neolithic long house
- Periods: Neolithic
- Location: Banchory, Aberdeenshire

History
- Built: Early to mid 4th millennium BC

Site notes
- Length: 26 m (85 ft)
- Width: 13 m (43 ft)
- Area: 329.6 m^{2} (3,548 sq ft)
- Excavation dates: 1977-1980
- Archaeologists: Nicholas Reynolds and Ian Ralston
- Condition: No extant remains
- Owner: Historic Scotland
- Management: RCAHMS
- Public access: Yes

Scheduled monument
- Official name: Balbridie timber hall
- Type: Prehistoric domestic and defensive: hall
- Designated: 11 January 1978
- Reference no.: SM4084

Balbridie is the site of a Neolithic long house in Aberdeenshire, Scotland, situated on the south bank of the River Dee, east of Banchory. The site is one of the earliest known permanent Neolithic settlements in Scotland, dating from 3400 to 4000 BC. The structure is the largest Neolithic long house to be excavated in Britain. In a European context, Whittle notes that such large Neolithic timber houses are rare, citing Balbridie, a hall in Cambridgeshire, and Fengate as a small set of such finds.

Neolithic features found in a later excavation at Dreghorn included post holes indicating a large rectangular structure comparable to Balbridie.

In 2022, a study of nitrogen content in ancient grain at the site by the University of Stavanger and Durham University published in the journal Antiquity revealed details of Neolithic farming techniques at the site, suggesting that manure was not used in the area because of the quality of its soil.

== Discovery ==
The Balbridie site was discovered in 1976 by aerial photography carried out by the Royal Commission on the Ancient and Historical Monuments of Scotland. The unusually dry summer revealed previously undetected cropmarks suggesting a very large structure. Subsequent archaeological work on site allowed the conceptual reconstruction of an enormous timber structure including the identification of large timber postholes.

== Relationship to other very early features ==
The vicinity of Balbridie includes a number of other notable archaeological features including the Neolithic site of Bucharn. Watt has pointed out that this local area attracted an unusual density of very early settlement in Scotland. Balbridie is not only close to the River Dee but also to the Elsick Mounth trackway, the route of early crossings inland through the lower Grampian Mountains.

== See also ==
- Coy Burn
