= Red Moss, Aberdeenshire =

Wetland bog in Aberdeenshire, Scotland

Coordinates: 57.036°N 2.231°W

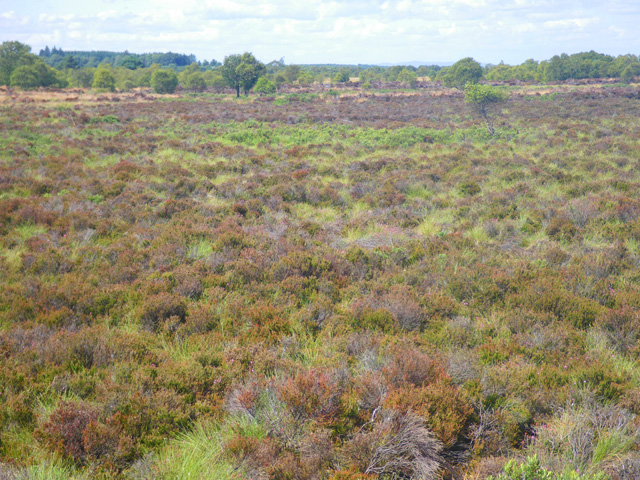
Red Moss

Red Moss is a wetland bog in Aberdeenshire, Scotland, located at the northwestern edge of the village of Netherley (Grid Reference NO 955 856). The moss is designated a national Site of Special Scientific Interest by NatureScot, due to its biodiversity and undisturbed character. The elevation of Red Moss is 113 metres above mean sea level. The upland areas above Red Moss are characterised as agricultural and woodland parcels which are generally attractive and separated by ancient drystone walls or hedgerows.

== Hydrology and water quality ==
The outlet to Red Moss with respect to drainage is the Crynoch Burn, which continues by the Lairhillock Inn and thence through Maryculter and the Oldman Wood. Feeding the Red Moss are the headwaters of Crynoch Burn, along with smaller tributaries draining lands of the south and east.

The bog is clearly acidic, with pH levels in the range of 5.68; moreover, electrical conductivity of the waters are low. Summer water temperatures are in the range of 17.5 to 18.0 degrees Celsius.

== History ==
Roman legions marched by Netherley traversing the route from Raedykes to Normandykes as they sought higher ground evading the bogs of Red Moss and other low-lying mosses associated with the Burn of Muchalls. Elsick Mounth is one of the ancient routes crossing the Grampian Mountains, lying west of Netherley. Alexander Silver, a wealthy East India trader, built Netherley House, a mansion house in Netherley in the late 18th century; he and his son George Silver were noted agricultural innovators of their era.

== See also ==
- Craggie Cat
- Muchalls Castle
- Netherley School
- Portlethen Moss
