= Elsick Mounth =

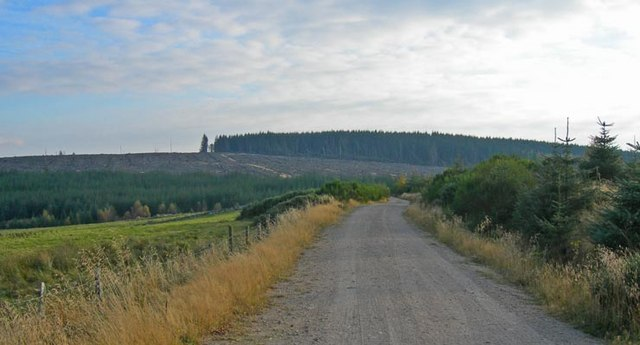

The Elsick Mounth is an ancient trackway crossing the Grampian Mountains in the vicinity of Netherley, Scotland. This trackway was one of the few means of traversing the Grampian Mounth area in prehistoric and medieval times. The highest pass of the route occurs within the Durris Forest. Notable historical structures in the vicinity are Maryculter House, Lairhillock Inn and Muchalls Castle. Most of the lands through which the Elsick Mounth passes are within the Durris Forest; this forest would have been a mixed deciduous forest in ancient times, but currently it is managed as a coniferous monoculture with extensive amounts of clearfelling and subsequent replanting.

== History ==
Roman legions marched from Raedykes to Normandykes Roman Camp (now just south of Peterculter) as they sought higher ground so as to avoid the bogs of Red Moss and other low-lying mosses associated with the Burn of Muchalls. That march used the Elsick Mounth, one of the ancient trackways crossing the Grampian Mountains, lying west of Netherley. To the north the Romans proceeded to the next camp at Ythan Wells.

== See also ==
- Drovers' road
- Meikle Carewe Hill
