= Normandykes =

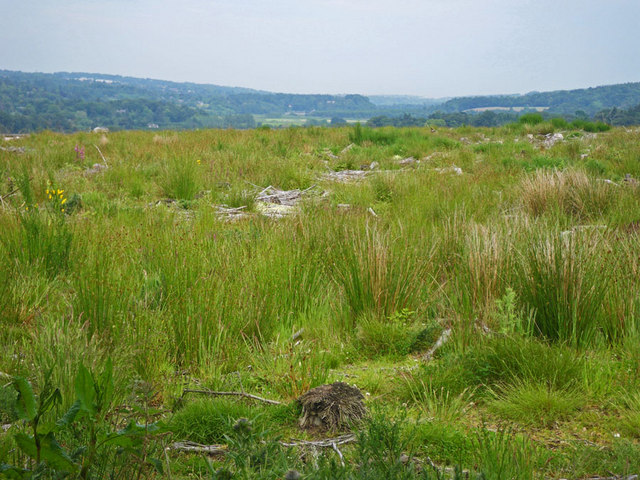
- Normandykes site in May 2009
- Interactive map of Normandykes
- 57.085°N 2.283°W
- Type: Roman marching camp
- Periods: Roman Iron Age
- Location: Peterculter, Aberdeen City, Scotland

History
- Built: c. 1-250 AD

Site notes
- Public access: Yes

Scheduled monument
- Official name: Normandykes, Roman camp
- Type: Roman: camp
- Designated: 11 November 1964
- Reference no.: SM2478

Normandykes (Grid Reference: NO 830994) is the site of a Roman marching camp 1 mile (1.6 km) to the southwest of Peterculter, City of Aberdeen, Scotland. The near-rectangular site, measuring approximately 860 by 510 metres (940 by 560 yd), covers about 106 acres (43 ha) of the summit and eastern slopes of a hill overlooking the River Dee and the B9077 road further south. Aerial photographs for Normandykes have been archived between 1947 and 1976. The camp is about 6 miles (10 km), or less than half a day's march, north of the Raedykes camp. It is possible that the actual route taken would have entailed one day's march, over a route likely chosen to avoid the Red Moss, a virtually uncrossable bog near the present day village of Netherley.

Normandykes was first mentioned as Norman's Dyke and interpreted as a Danish Camp in 1795, but then corrected in the New Statistical Account of 1845 as Roman.

The camp was first excavated in the year 1935 by Richmond and MacIntyre; construction is thought to date to the Antonine or Severan periods.

The site is designated a scheduled monument.

== See also ==
- Balbridie
- Crynoch Burn
- Deers Den
- Glenmailen
- Leuchar Burn
- Maryculter House
- Ythan Wells
- Muiryfold
