= Maryculter House =

Historic house in Maryculter near Aberdeen in Scotland

Coordinates: 57.0897°N 2.2590°W

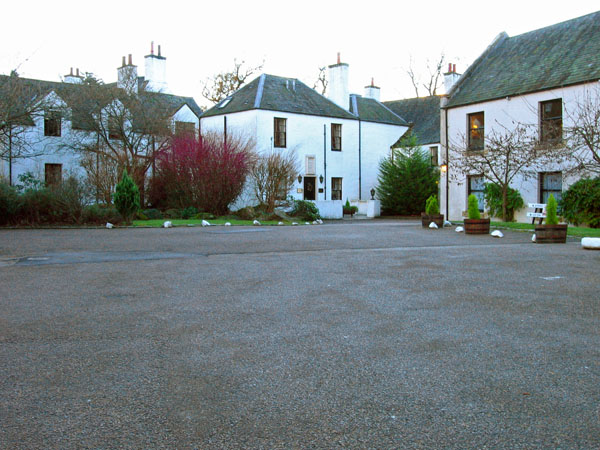
Maryculter House

Maryculter House is a historic house in the village of Maryculter, or Kirkton of Maryculter, in the Lower Deeside area of Aberdeenshire, Scotland.

== History ==
Lying along both banks of the River Dee, the Lands of Culter originally included the parishes of Peterculter and Maryculter. These were in the jurisdiction of the monks of Kelso. However, about the year 1187, William the Lion granted the portion of the Culter lands on the south bank of the river to the Knights Templar.

Between 1221 and 1236 Walter Byset, Lord of Aboyne, founded the Preceptory or College of the Knights Templar on the site of Maryculter House Hotel. The barrel-vaulted basement of the house is said to have formed part of the Preceptor's Lodging.

The Templars also built a chapel. This became the parish church in 1535, was abandoned in 1782 and is now a fragmentary ruin, the only architectural feature surviving being the piscina built into the south wall. The chapel and surrounding graveyard are a Scheduled monument. The chapel was replaced as the parish church by Maryculter Trinity Church.

The Templars were suppressed around 1309 but their lands and the parish church remained in the hands of the Knights Hospitaller until 1563/64.

From 1535 to 1811 Maryculter House was first rented and then owned by the Menzies family of Pitfodels, Aberdeen, though another source says it was owned by the Lindsay family until 1726.

In 1811, Maryculter was bought by General William Gordon of Fyvie, and the Gordon family owned the estate until the death of Sir Cosmo Duff-Gordon in 1931 led to the sale of the property in 1935. The estate was broken up and the home-park was bought by the City of Aberdeen Boy Scouts' Association to create Templars' Park Scout Campsite. Alterations to the house took place in 1936.

The building is now a hotel, previously the Deeside Hotel and now Maryculter House Hotel. It is a Historic Environment Scotland Category B Listed building.

== Bibliography ==
- Nicol, Norman D (1999) Maryculter in the Eighteenth Century: Lairds, Kirk and People in a Lower Deeside Parish
