= Netherley, Aberdeenshire =

Village in Aberdeenshire, Scotland

Coordinates: 57°1′57″N 2°14′30″W

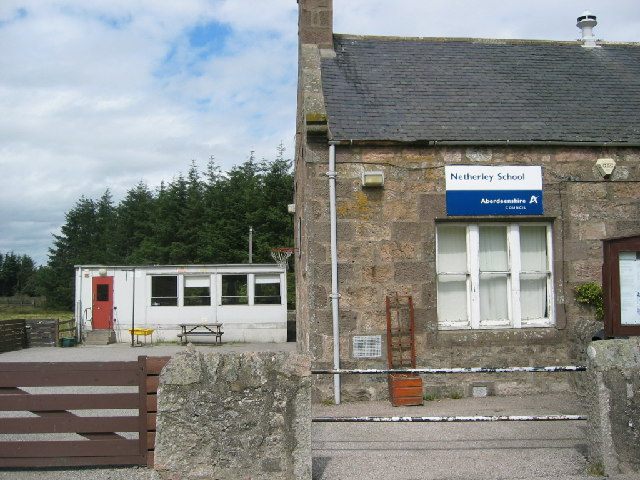
Netherley School

Netherley (Scots pronunciation: [ˌnɛðərˈɫəi]) is a village in Aberdeenshire, situated approximately five miles northwest of Stonehaven. Netherley is located in the Mounth area of the Grampian Highlands. At the eastern edge of Netherley is a significant wetland bog known as Red Moss. To the southwest of Netherley lie Meikle Carewe Hill and Curlethney Hill. At the south edge of Netherley is the peak of Craggie Cat.

== Natural features ==
The Red Moss is a national Site of Special Scientific Interest within the United Kingdom, due to its diverse species content and its undisturbed habitat; the outlet of Red Moss is Crynoch Burn. To the west of Netherley lies another watercourse, Cairnie Burn, which is a tributary of the Crynoch Burn.

== Education ==
Netherley School is an historic primary school located in the village. The original stone building dates back to at least the 1800s, a new facility was opened in 2007 which combined the primaries of Netherley and Maryculter. The new school is situated next to the Lairhillock Inn, and the old school building which is no longer used for primary education has been converted for domestic use.

== History ==
Roman legions marched by Netherley traversing the route from Raedykes to Normandykes as they sought higher ground evading the bogs of Red Moss and other low-lying mosses associated with the Burn of Muchalls. Elsick Mounth is one of the ancient routes crossing the Grampian Mountains, lying west of Netherley. Alexander Silver, a wealthy East India trader, built a mansion house in Netherley in the late 1700s; he and his son George Silver were noted agricultural innovators of their era.
