= Hill of Muchalls =

Coordinates: 57°0′37″N 2°12′26″W

The Hill of Muchalls is a coastal mountainous landform situated approximately 1.4 kilometres west of the Bridge of Muchalls in Aberdeenshire, Scotland within the Mounth Range of the Grampian Mountains. The peak elevation of this mountain is 120 metres above mean sea level. From Megray Hill there are expansive views to the North Sea facing east. The summit affords scenic vies of the historic harbour of Stonehaven.

== Geology and hydrology ==
The surface runoff and flank drainages of the Hill of Muchalls flow to the Burn of Muchalls, situated nearby to the north. Nearby similar landforms include Kempstone Hill, Garrison Hill, Craggie Cat and Curlethney Hill.

== History ==
Neolithic traces of civilisation appear on the nearby Kempstone Hill in the form of standing stones. This hill is near to the posited location for the noted Battle of Mons Graupius between the Romans and the indigenous Caledonians. The major Roman Camp of Raedykes is situated approximately four kilometres to the southwest. Proximate area historic structures of note include Muchalls Castle, Ury House and Rickarton House.
