= Burn of Monboys =

Stream in Aberdeenshire, Scotland

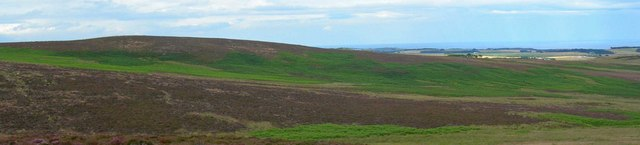
- Burn of Monboys watershed looking east

Location
- Country: Scotland

Physical characteristics
- Source
  - location: Mounth (Grampian Mountains)
- Mouth: Cowie Water
  - coordinates: 57.01224°N 2.16362°W

Burn of Monboys is a stream that rises in the Mounth, or eastern range of the Grampian Mountains, northwest of Stonehaven and south of Netherley, Aberdeenshire, Scotland. Monboys Burn is a tributary to the Cowie Water.

== Hydrology ==
The headwaters of the Burn of Monboys rise on the southern and western slopes of the Meikle Carewe Hill where the stream flows downslope at a first westerly and thence southerly as it makes its way to discharge to the Cowie Water. The southwestern flanks of Craggie Cat, a hill in the northeast part of the Burn of Monboys drainage basin, drain to the Burn of Monboys. The stream has a greenish brown appearance and generally has lush vegetation growing all the way to its margins throughout most of its course of the middle and downstream reaches. The turbidity typically measures approximately 10 JTU and the July flow rate is roughly five cubic feet per second in the headwaters reach. pH levels have been measured at 7.27, very slightly alkaline, but undoubtedly less basic than other area streams due to the drainage from the higher elevation peat moorlands of Meikle Carewe and Curlethney Hills.

== History ==
The Roman Camp Raedykes occupied the higher ground of the headwaters area of Burn of Monboys, and the east flank of Raedykes provides surface runoff to the Burn of Monboys. A number of historical analysts, including the 19th century researcher Gabriel Jaques Surenne and 20th century writers Watt and Hogan, hypothesize that the Battle of Mons Graupius was fought in the Burn of Monboys watershed.

== See also ==
- Burn of Muchalls
- Cowie Castle
- Muchalls Castle
- Ury House
