= Megray Hill =

Landform in Aberdeenshire, Scotland

Coordinates: 56.9869°N 2.2011°W

Megray Hill is a low-lying coastal mountainous landform in Aberdeenshire, Scotland within the Mounth Range of the Grampian Mountains. The peak elevation of this mountain is 120 metres above mean sea level. This hill has been posited as a likely location for the noted Battle of Mons Graupius between the Romans and the indigenous Caledonians. The major Roman Camp of Raedykes is situated about three kilometres to the west. From Megray Hill there are expansive views to the North Sea facing east. The summit affords scenic views of the historic harbour of Stonehaven.

== Geology and hydrology ==
Megray Hill is situated approximately 1.1 kilometers to the north of Stonehaven; surface runoff and drainage from the northern and eastern slopes of Megray Hill flow north to the Burn of Muchalls. Surface runoff from the south flank flows is within the Cowie Water catchment area, the Cowie Water being a very slightly alkaline stream These low pH levels (compared to other area streams) may be caused in part by the peat drainage from the moorland on Meikle Carewe Hill and Curlethney Hill through the tributary Burn of Monboys.

== Prehistory ==
Neolithic traces of civilisation appear on the nearby Kempstone Hill in the form of standing stones.

== History ==
Since the High Middle Ages the ancient drovers' road, the Causey Mounth was used to traverse the journey between Stonehaven and Aberdeen. a portion of this trackway lies on the eastern flank of Megray Hill.

== Wind farm proposal ==
Renewable Energy Resources has an application pending before the Aberdeenshire Council to create a windfarm for electrical power generation using Curlethney Hill, Meikle Carewe Hill (hills slightly to the west of Megray Hill to install 12 wind turbines. Each turbine would reach a height of 70 metres above grade level, and the entire complex could generate enough power to supply the equivalent of 5000 homes. Environmental concerns over the proposal include noise pollution, visual impact and ecological disturbance.

== See also ==
- Fetteresso Castle
- Limpet Burn
- Muchalls Castle
