= Gnaeus Julius Agricola =

Roman governor and general (40–93)

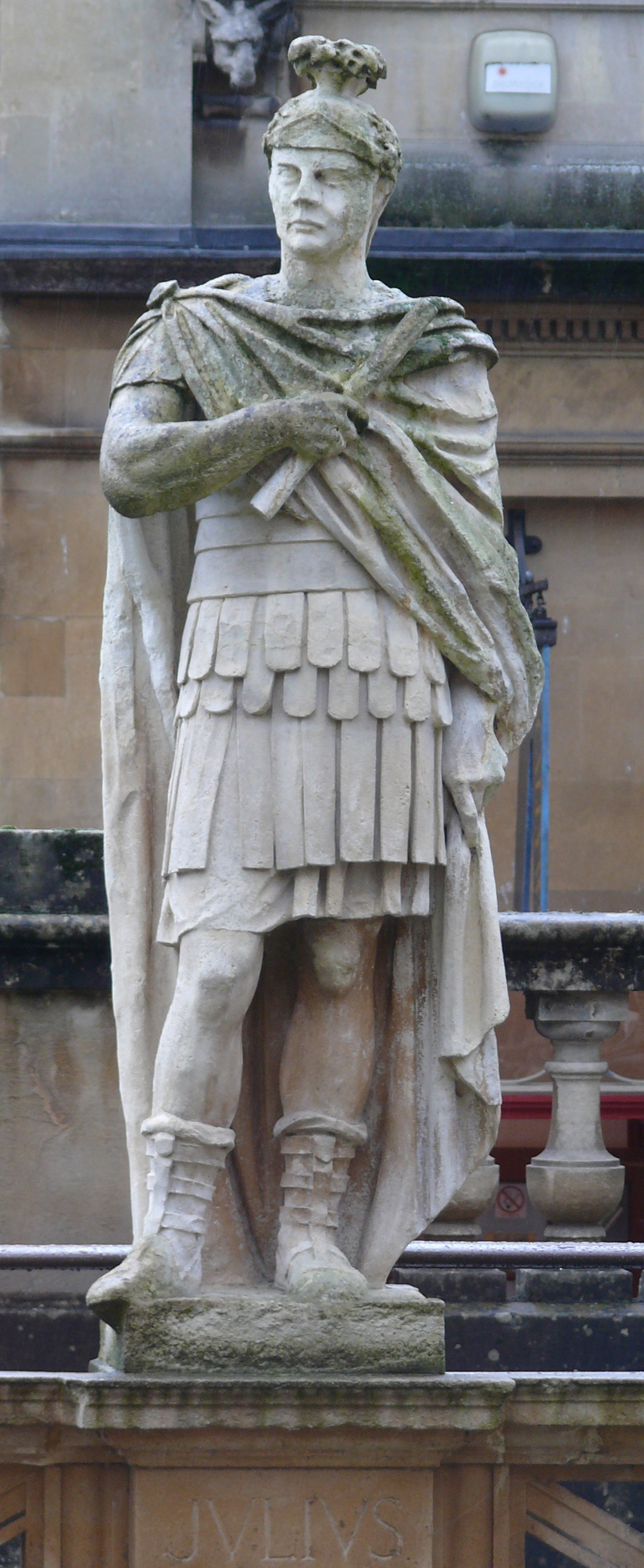
- A statue of Agricola erected at the Roman Baths at Bath in 1894
- Born: 13 June 40; Forum Julii, Gallia Narbonensis (now Fréjus, France)
- Died: 23 August 93 (aged 53); Gallia Narbonensis (now Languedoc and Provence, France)
- Military career
- Allegiance: Roman Empire
- Service years: 58–85
- Rank: Proconsul
- Commands: Legio XX Valeria Victrix; Gallia Aquitania; Britannia
- Conflicts: Battle of Watling Street; Battle of Mons Graupius
- Awards: Ornamenta triumphalia

Gnaeus Julius Agricola (/əˈɡrɪkələ/; 13 June 40 – 23 August 93) was a Roman general and politician responsible for much of the Roman conquest of Britain. Born to a political family of senatorial rank, Agricola began his military career as a military tribune under governor Gaius Suetonius Paulinus. In his subsequent career, he served in a variety of political positions in Rome. In 64, he was appointed quaestor in Asia province. Two years later, he was appointed Plebeian Tribune, and in 68, he was made praetor. During the Year of the Four Emperors in 69, he supported Vespasian, general of the Syrian army, in his bid for the throne.

When Vespasian became emperor, Agricola was made a patrician and appointed governor of Gallia Aquitania. In 77, he was made consul and governor of Britannia. As governor, he completed the conquest of what is today Wales and northern England, and led his army to the far north of Scotland, establishing forts across much of the lowlands. In 85, Agricola was recalled from Britain after an unusually lengthy service by Emperor Domitian. After his return, he retired from military and public life and died in 93. Most of what is known about Agricola and his governorship was written in the De vita et moribus Iulii Agricolae, a primary source, written by Tacitus, Agricola's son-in-law, and detailed archaeological evidence from northern Britain.

== Early life ==
Agricola was born in the colonia of Forum Julii, Gallia Narbonensis (now Fréjus, France). Agricola's parents were from noted political families of senatorial rank in Roman Gaul. Both of his grandfathers served as imperial governors. His father, Lucius Julius Graecinus, was a praetor and had become a member of the Roman Senate in the year of Agricola's birth. Graecinus had become distinguished by his interest in philosophy. Between August 40 and January 41, the emperor Caligula ordered his death, because he refused to prosecute the emperor's second cousin Marcus Junius Silanus.

His mother was Julia Procilla. The Roman historian Tacitus describes her as "a lady of singular virtue" who had a fond affection for her son. Agricola was educated in Massilia (Marseille), and showed what was considered to be an unhealthy interest in philosophy.

== Political career ==
He began his career in Roman public life as a military tribune, and served in Britain under Gaius Suetonius Paulinus from 58 to 62. He was probably attached to the Legio II Augusta, but was chosen to serve on Suetonius's staff and thus almost certainly participated in the suppression of Boudica's uprising in 61.

Returning from Britain to Rome in 62, he married Domitia Decidiana, a woman of noble birth. Their first child was a son. Agricola was appointed as quaestor in 64, which he served in the province of Asia under the corrupt proconsul Lucius Salvius Otho Titianus. While he was there, his daughter, Julia Agricola, was born, but his son died shortly afterwards. He was tribune of the plebs in 66 and praetor in June 68, during which time he was ordered by the Governor of Spain Galba to take an inventory of the temple treasures.

During that time, the emperor Nero was declared a public enemy by the Senate and committed suicide, and the period of civil war known as the Year of the Four Emperors began. Galba succeeded Nero, but was murdered in early 69 by Otho, who took the throne. Agricola's mother was murdered on her estate in Liguria by Otho's marauding fleet. Hearing of Vespasian's bid for the empire, Agricola immediately gave him his support. Otho meanwhile committed suicide after being defeated by Vitellius.

After Vespasian had established himself as emperor, Agricola was appointed to the command of the Legio XX Valeria Victrix, stationed in Britain, in place of Marcus Roscius Coelius, who had stirred up a mutiny against the governor, Marcus Vettius Bolanus. Britain had revolted during the year of civil war, and Bolanus was a mild governor. Agricola reimposed discipline on the legion and helped to consolidate Roman rule. In 71, Bolanus was replaced by a more aggressive governor, Quintus Petillius Cerialis, and Agricola was able to display his talents as a commander in campaigns against the Brigantes in northern England.

When his command ended in 73, Agricola was enrolled as a patrician and appointed to govern Gallia Aquitania. There he stayed for almost three years. In 76 or 77, he was recalled to Rome and appointed suffect consul, and betrothed his daughter to Tacitus. The following year, Tacitus and Julia married; Agricola was appointed to the College of Pontiffs, and returned to Britain for a third time, as its governor (Legatus Augusti pro praetore).

== Governor of Britain ==
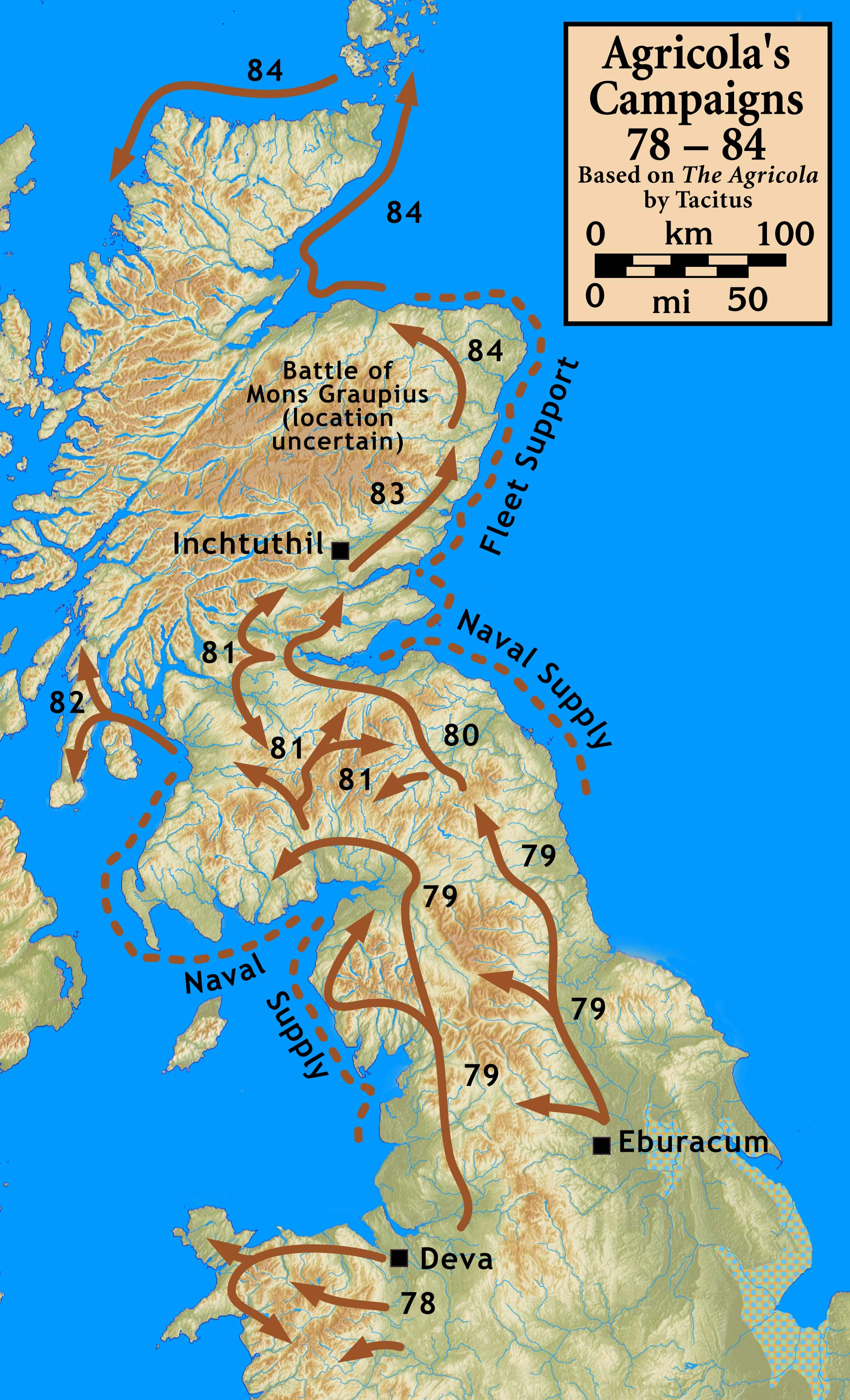

Arriving in midsummer of 77, Agricola discovered that the Ordovices of north Wales had virtually destroyed the Roman cavalry stationed in their territory. He immediately moved against them and defeated them. His campaign then moved on to Anglesey where he subjugated the entire island. Almost two decades earlier, Governor Gaius Suetonius Paulinus had attempted the same but Roman forces had to withdraw in 60 CE because of the outbreak of the Boudican rebellion.

Agricola also expanded Roman rule north into Caledonia (modern Scotland). In the summer of 79, he pushed his armies to the estuary of the river Taus, usually interpreted as the Firth of Tay, virtually unchallenged, and established some forts. Though their location is left unspecified, the close dating of the fort at Elginhaugh in Midlothian makes it a possible candidate. He established himself as a good administrator by reforming the widely corrupt corn levy as well as through his military successes. He introduced Romanising measures, encouraging communities to build towns on the Roman model and gave a Roman education to sons of native nobility; albeit, as Tacitus notes, for the cynical reason of pacifying the aggressive tribes in Britannia for the servitude of Rome.

=== Hibernia ===
In 81, Agricola "crossed in the first ship" and defeated peoples unknown to the Romans until then. Tacitus, in Chapter 24 of Agricola, does not tell us what body of water he crossed. Modern scholarship favours either the Firth of Clyde or Firth of Forth. Tacitus also mentions Hibernia, so southwest Scotland is perhaps to be preferred. The text of the Agricola has been amended here to record the Romans "crossing into trackless wastes", referring to the wilds of the Galloway peninsula. Agricola fortified the coast facing Ireland, and Tacitus recalls that his father-in-law often claimed the island could be conquered with a single legion and auxiliaries. He had given refuge to an exiled Irish king whom he hoped he might use as the excuse for conquest. This conquest never happened, but some historians believe the crossing referred to was in fact a small-scale exploratory or punitive expedition to Ireland, though no Roman camps have been identified to confirm such a suggestion.

Irish legend provides a striking parallel. Tuathal Teachtmhar, a legendary High King, is said to have been exiled from Ireland as a boy, and to have returned from Britain at the head of an army to claim the throne. The traditional date of his return is between 76 and 80, and archaeology has found Roman or Romano-British artefacts in several sites associated with Tuathal.

=== The invasion of Caledonia (Scotland) ===
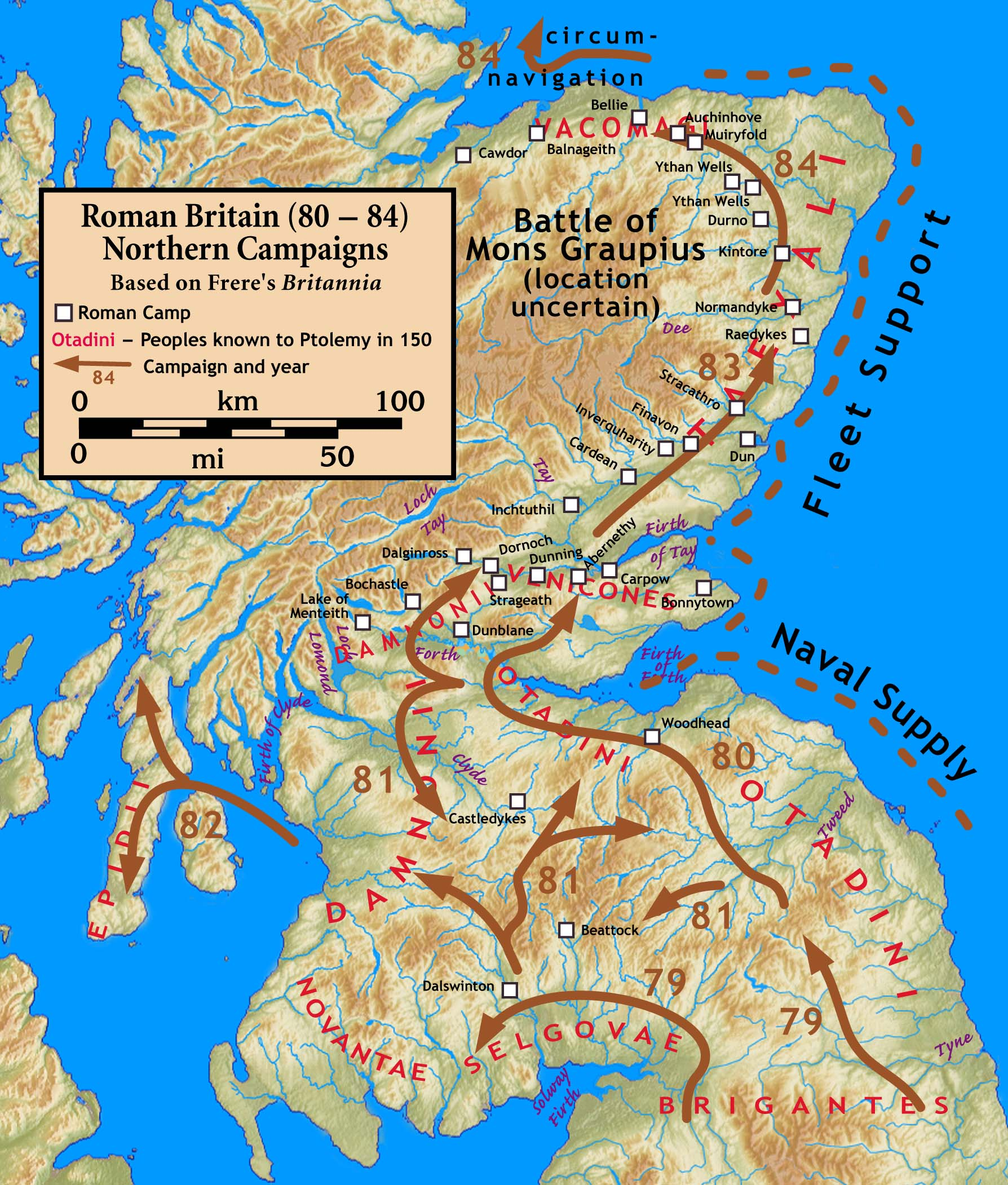

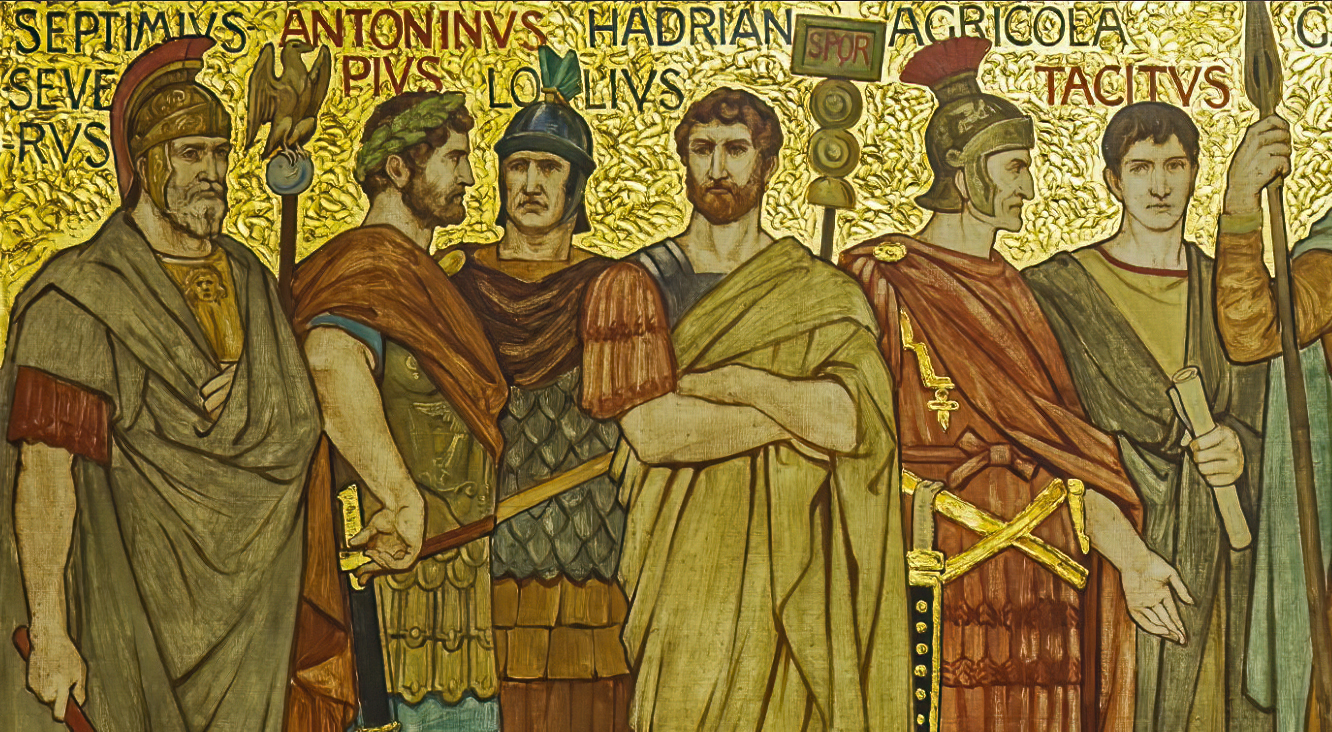
Agricola (second from right) among Roman generals and emperors (names written above heads) in this frieze from the Great Hall of the National Galleries Scotland by William Brassey Hole 1897

The following year, Agricola raised a fleet and encircled the tribes beyond the Forth, and the Caledonians rose in great numbers against him. They attacked the camp of the Legio IX Hispana at night, but Agricola sent in his cavalry and they were put to flight. The Romans responded by pushing further north. Another son was born to Agricola this year, but died before his first birthday.

In the summer of 83, Agricola faced the massed armies of the Caledonians, led by Calgacus, at the Battle of Mons Graupius. Tacitus estimates their numbers at more than 30,000. Agricola put his auxiliaries in the front line, keeping the legions in reserve, and relied on close-quarters fighting to make the Caledonians' unpointed slashing swords useless as they were unable to swing them properly or utilise thrusting attacks. Even though the Caledonians were put to rout and therefore lost this battle, two thirds of their army managed to escape and hide in the Highlands or the "trackless wilds" as Tacitus calls them. Battle casualties were estimated by Tacitus to be about 10,000 on the Caledonian side and 360 on the Roman side.

A number of authors have reckoned the battle to have occurred in the Grampian Mounth within sight of the North Sea. In particular, Roy, Surenne, Watt, Hogan and others have advanced notions that the site of the battle may have been Kempstone Hill, Megray Hill or other knolls near the Raedykes Roman camp; these points of high ground are proximate to the Elsick Mounth, an ancient trackway used by Romans and Caledonians for military manoeuvres. However, following the discovery of the Roman camp at Durno in 1975, most scholars now believe that the battle took place on the ground around Bennachie in Aberdeenshire.

Satisfied with his victory, Agricola extracted hostages from the Caledonian tribes. He may have marched his army to the northern coast of Britain, as evidenced by the probable discovery of a Roman fort at Cawdor (near Inverness).

He also instructed the prefect of the fleet to sail around the north coast, confirming (allegedly for the first time) that Britain was in fact an island.

=== Findings ===
In 2019, GUARD Archaeology team led by Iraia Arabaolaza uncovered a marching camp dating to the 1st century AD in Ayr, used by Roman legions during the invasion of Roman General Agricola. According to Arabaolaza, the fire pits were split 30 meters apart into two parallel lines. The findings also included clay-domed ovens and 26 fire pits dated to between 77- 86 AD and 90 AD loaded with burnt material and charcoal contents. Archaeologists suggested that this site had been chosen as a strategic location for the Roman conquest of Ayrshire.

== Later years ==
Agricola was recalled from Britain in 85, after an unusually long tenure as governor of the province. Tacitus claims Domitian ordered his recall because Agricola's successes outshone the emperor's own modest victories in Germany. He re-entered Rome unobtrusively, reporting as ordered to the palace at night.

The relationship between Agricola and the emperor is unclear; on the one hand, Agricola was awarded triumphal decorations and a statue (the highest military honours apart from an actual triumph); on the other, Agricola never again held a civil or military post, in spite of his experience and renown. He was offered the governorship of the province of Africa, but declined it, whether due to ill health or (as Tacitus claims) the machinations of Domitian.

In 93, Agricola died on his family estates in Gallia Narbonensis aged fifty-three. According to his son-in-law, the Roman historian Tacitus, rumours circulated attributing the death to a poison administered by emperor Domitian, but no positive evidence for this was ever produced.

== See also ==
- Cawdor (Roman fort)
- History of Northumberland

== Sources ==
- Anthony Birley (1996), “Iulius Agricola, Cn.”, in Hornblower, Simon, Oxford Classical Dictionary, Oxford: Oxford University Press
- Duncan B Campbell, Mons Graupius AD 83, Oxford: Osprey Publishing, 2010. 96pp.
- "Agricola's Campaigns", special issue of Ancient Warfare, 1/1 (2007)
- Wolfson, Stan. Tacitus, Thule and Caledonia: the achievements of Agricola's navy in their true perspective. Oxford, England: Archaeopress, 2008. 118pp. (BAR British series; 459).

Political offices
Preceded by Gaius Catellius Celer Gaius Arruntius Catellius Celer, and Marcus Arruntius Aquila as Suffect consul	Suffect Consul of the Roman Republic; 77 with ignotus	Succeeded by Decimus Junius Novius Priscus, and Lucius Ceionius Commodus
Preceded by Sextus Julius Frontinus	Roman governors of Britain; 78–85	Succeeded by Sallustius Lucullus
