= Grampian Mountains =

Mountain range in Scotland

Coordinates: 56°55′N 4°00′W

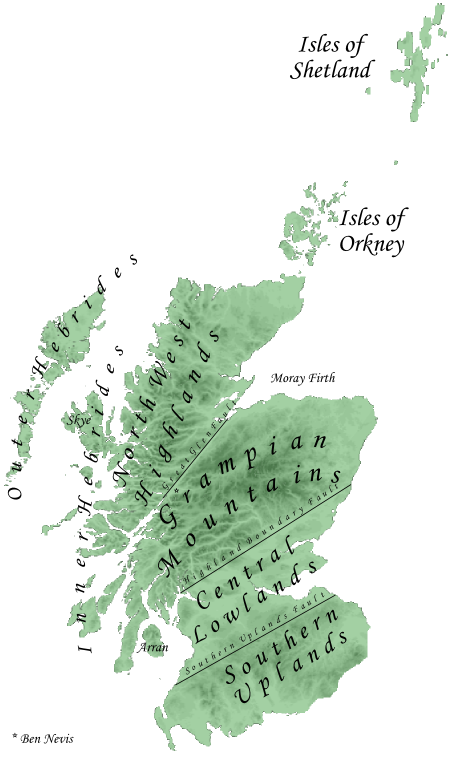
Location of the Grampian Mountains within Scotland

The Grampian Mountains (Scottish Gaelic: Am Monadh) is one of the three major mountain ranges in Scotland, that together occupy about half the country. The other two ranges are the Northwest Highlands and the Southern Uplands. The Grampian range extends northeast to southwest between the Highland Boundary Fault and the Great Glen. The range includes many of the highest mountains in the British Isles, including Ben Nevis (whose peak contains the highest point in the British Isles at 1,345 m or 4,413 ft above sea level) and Ben Macdui (whose peak contains second-highest at 1,309 m or 4,295 ft).

A number of rivers and streams rise in the Grampians, including the Tay, Spey, Cowie Water, Burn of Muchalls, Burn of Pheppie, Burn of Elsick, Cairnie Burn, Don, Dee and Esk. The area is generally sparsely populated.

There is some ambiguity about the extent of the range, and until the nineteenth century, they were generally considered to be more than one range, which all formed part of the wider Scottish Highlands. This view is still held by many today, and they have no single name in the Scottish Gaelic language or the Doric dialect of Lowland Scots. In both languages, a number of names are used. The name "Grampian" has been used in the titles of organisations covering parts of Scotland north of the Central Belt, including the former local government area of Grampian Region (translated into Scots Gaelic as Roinn a' Mhonaidh), NHS Grampian, and Grampian Television.

== Name ==
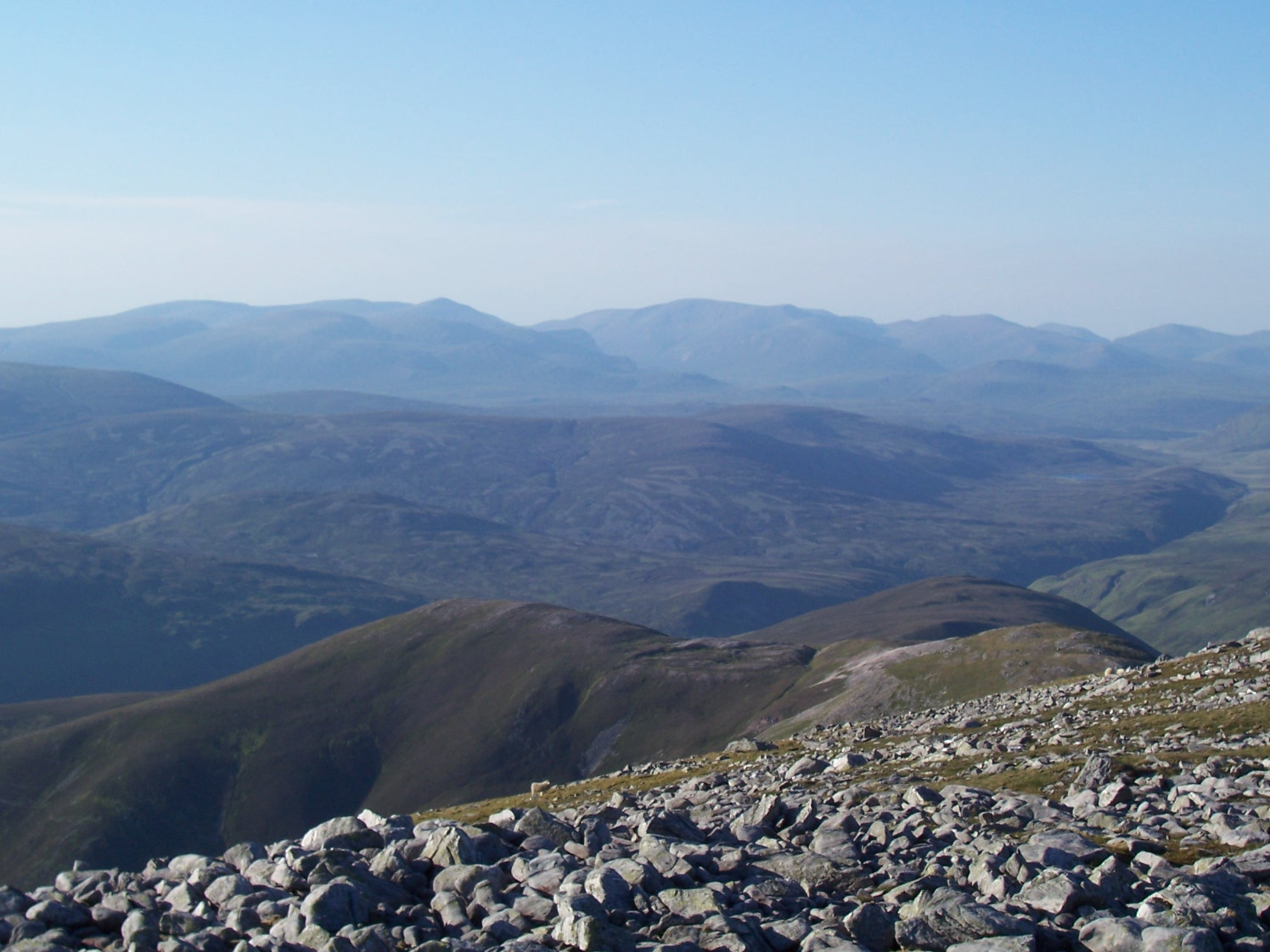
The Cairngorms from Beinn a' Ghlò.

The Roman historian Tacitus recorded Mons Graupius as the site of the defeat of the native Caledonians by Gnaeus Julius Agricola c. 83 AD. The actual location of Mons Graupius, literally 'Mount Graupius' (the element 'Graupius' is of unknown meaning), is a matter of dispute among historians, though most favour a location within the Grampian massif, possibly at Raedykes, Megray Hill or Kempstone Hill. The spelling Graupius comes from the Codex Aesinas, a mediaeval copy of Tacitus's Germania believed to be from the mid-9th century. In the Middle Ages, this locale was known as the Mounth, a name still held by a number of geographical features.

=== Etymology ===
Recorded first as Graupius in 83 A.D, the origin of the name Grampians is uncertain. The name may be Brittonic and represent a corrupted form, of which the genuine would be *Cripius, containing *crip meaning "ridge" (cf. Welsh crib).

"Graupius" was incorrectly rendered "Grampius" in the 1476 printed edition of Tacitus's Agricola. The name Grampians is believed to have first been applied to the mountain range in 1520 by the Scottish historian Hector Boece, perhaps an adaptation of the incorrect Mons Grampius. Thus the range may owe its name to a typesetter's mistake.

== Extent ==
There is some ambiguity about the extent of the range. Fenton Wyness, writing about Deeside, puts the northern edge of the Grampians at the River Dee in the introduction to his 1968 book Royal Valley : The Story Of The Aberdeenshire Dee:

... until comparatively recent times, Deeside was an isolated and little frequented region and the reason for this is the extensive mountain barrier of the Grampians which begins in a low range on the seacoast immediately south of Aberdeen and rise through various intervening heights such as Cairn-mon-earn (1,245 ft), Kerloch (1,747 ft), Mount Battoch (2,555 ft), Mount Keen (3,007 ft), Lochnagar (3,786 ft), Beinn a' Ghlo (3,671 ft), to Beinn Dearg (3,556 ft)

— Fenton Wyness

This introduction appears to suggest that Wyness defines the Grampians as being the range of mountains running from immediately south of Aberdeen westward to Beinn Dearg in the Forest of Atholl. Similarly, Adam Watson, when defining the extent of the Cairngorms, specifically excluded the range south of the River Dee, writing:

The other main hill group is the long chain running from Drumochter in the west almost to the sea just south of Aberdeen. Many maps and books have given its name as 'the Grampians' but although children have to learn this at school, they do not learn it at home and nowhere is it used in local speech. Some map-makers have confused the issue by printing 'Grampians' over the Cairngorms and Strath Don hills as well!

— Adam Watson

Both Wyness and Watson appear to exclude the Cairngorms from the Grampians, regarding them as a separate range. In effect, Wyness' and Watson's definition of the Grampians is as a synonym for the Mounth. However Robert Gordon, writing in the 1650s, used the term Grampians to refer to hills on either side of the River Dee, and thus explicitly included the Cairngorms within the range.

Wyness and Watson both exclude areas west of the Pass of Drumochter from the Grampians, but the 1911 Encyclopedia Britannica adopted a wider definition, including the highlands as far as Dunbartonshire in the west.

== Geology ==
The Grampian Mountains are chiefly made up of metamorphic and igneous rocks. The mountains are composed of granite, gneiss, marble, schists and quartzite.

The Quaternary glaciation (<2.6 Ma) eroded the region significantly, and glacial deposits, such as tills, are largely those of the last Ice Age (< 20 Ka).

== Sub-ranges ==
The following ranges of hills and mountains fall within the generally recognised definition of the Grampians, i.e. lying between the Highland and Great Glen fault lines:

- Cairngorms
- Monadh Liath
- Mounth
- Grey Corries
- Mamores
- Ben Alder Forest
- The mountains of Glen Coe and Glen Etive
- Black Mount
- Breadalbane Hills
- Trossachs
- Arrochar Alps
- Cowal
- The Isle of Arran

== In Literature ==
In the popular 1756 play Douglas, the second act begins with a speech that mentions the Grampian Hills:

My name is Norval; on the Grampian Hills
My father feeds his flocks; a frugal swain,
Whose constant cares were to increase his store.
And keep his only son, myself, at home.

The speech "acquired a life of its own, independent of the play, and became widely known through public recitations, lessons in speech, school memorizations and the like" during the 18th and 19th centuries. The speech (and thus the reference to the Grampian Hills) are casually referred to by Jane Austen, Charles Dickens, and George Bernard Shaw.

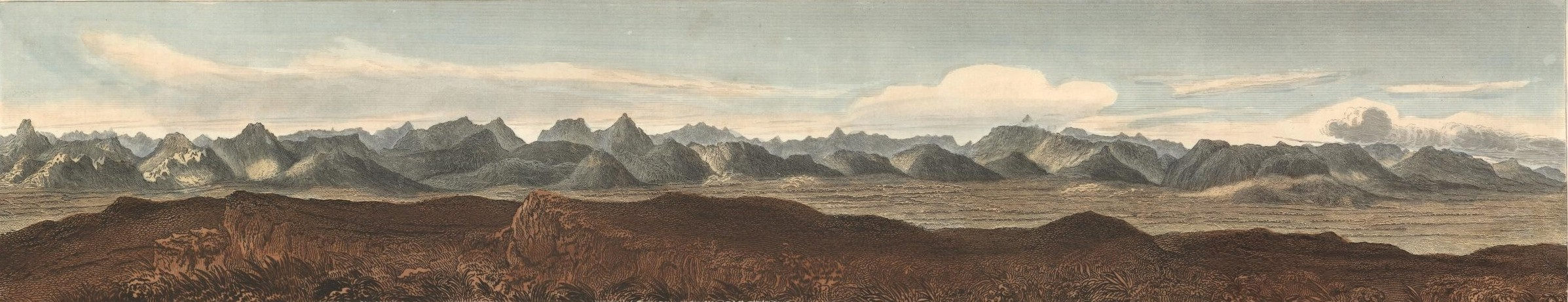
View of the Grampian Mountains, 1831

== See also ==
- Ben Nevis
- Buachaille Etive Mòr
- Glen Coe
- List of deaths on eight-thousanders
- Mountains and hills of Scotland
- Scottish Highlands
