= Dicalydones =

Pictish tribe

The Dicalydones were mentioned by the 4th century writer Ammianus Marcellinus as one of the two branches of the Picti, the Picts, the inhabitants of modern-day Scotland (the other being the Verturiones).

The name bears a striking resemblance to the other historical nomenclature donated to the Picts by classical historians, Caledonii. Some scholars theorize that the two groups (Dicalydones and Caledonii) are one and the same, and that the other major Pictish tribes, related by Ptolemy as the Vacomagi, Venicones, and Taezali, eventually went on to form the Maeatae mentioned by Cassius Dio. Other archaic accounts, which mention the Caledonii and Maeatae as the two major Pictish tribes, would seem to corroborate this hypothesis.
