= Mill of Muchalls =

Water-powered mill in Scotland

Coordinates: 57.0119°N 2.1670°W

The Mill of Muchalls is an historic water-powered mill located along the Burn of Muchalls in Aberdeenshire, Scotland. This mill is situated near to the coast of the North Sea proximate to Doonie Point. The earliest position of the village of Muchalls lay slightly to the south of the Mill of Muchalls. The Mill of Muchalls is situated slightly to the east of the ancient Causey Mounth trackway, a drovers' road established at least as early as the High Middle Ages.

== See also ==
- Bridge of Muchalls
- Muchalls Castle
