= Domitia =

Domitia is the name of women from the gens Domitia of Ancient Rome. Women from the gens include:

- Domitia (aunt of Messalina), aunt of Roman emperor Nero and empress Messalina
- Domitia Lepida, mother of Roman empress Valeria Messalina
- Domitia Longina (c. 54–128), wife of Roman Emperor Domitian
- Domitia Decidiana (1st century), wife of Roman General Gnaeus Julius Agricola and mother-in-law to historian Tacitus
- Domitia Calvilla or Domitia Lucilla Minor (died c. 158), mother of Roman Emperor Marcus Aurelius
- Domitia Paulina (died c. 85), mother of Roman Emperor Hadrian
- Aelia Domitia Paulina (75–130), sister of Roman Emperor Hadrian
- Domitia Faustina, short-lived daughter of Roman Emperor Marcus Aurelius and Roman Empress Faustina the Younger
- Saint Domitia, a saint of Orthodox Christianity

== See also ==
- Ahenobarbus
