= Muchalls =

Coordinates: 57.021°N 2.161°W

- Location within Aberdeenshire
- Population: 500 (approx)
- OS grid reference: NO902922
  - Edinburgh: 115 mi (185 km) SSW
  - London: 510 mi (820 km) SSE
- Council area: Aberdeenshire
- Lieutenancy area: Kincardineshire
- Country: Scotland
- Sovereign state: United Kingdom
- Post town: STONEHAVEN
- Postcode district: AB39
- Dialling code: 01569
- Police: Scotland
- Fire: Scottish
- Ambulance: Scottish
- UK Parliament: West Aberdeenshire and Kincardine
- Scottish Parliament: Aberdeen South and North Kincardine

Muchalls is a small coastal ex-fishing village in Kincardineshire, Scotland, south of Newtonhill and north of Stonehaven. Muchalls is situated slightly north of a smaller hamlet known as the Bridge of Muchalls. At the western edge of Muchalls is the historic Saint Ternan's Church. The rugged North Sea coastline near Muchalls features numerous cliffs, sea stacks and headlands, not infrequently in haar. The Grim Brigs headland is situated at Muchalls southern edge and Doonie Point headland is approximately 1.5 kilometres south.

== History ==
Muchalls is situated slightly to the east of the ancient Causey Mounth trackway, which was constructed on high ground to ensure passage along the only available medieval route from coastal points south from Stonehaven to Aberdeen. This ancient passage specifically connected the River Dee crossing (where the present Bridge of Dee is situated) via Gillybrands, Muchalls Castle and Stonehaven to the south. William Keith, 7th Earl Marischal and the Marquess of Montrose took that route when they led a Covenanter army of 9000 men in the battle of the Civil War in 1639. From Muchalls Castle to the sea is a secret cave, about one mile long, which smugglers once used. The cave is said to be haunted by the green lady. The cave has been boarded up at the castle end and at the sea. The portion of the cave near Muchalls's bridge has collapsed just below the railway line.

Charles Dickens visited Muchalls in its heyday as a Victorian resort and declared that Muchalls was a remarkably beautiful place. Footage was recorded in Muchalls for the 1990 film Hamlet. Muchalls is the birthplace of Richard Henry Brunton, the father of Japanese lighthouses.

== Transportation ==
Between 1849 and 1950, the village was served by the Muchalls Railway Station, on the Aberdeen Railway, the location of which can be estimated by its proximity to the Muchalls Peace Sign.

The 108 bus between Muchalls and Newtonhill was withdrawn in 2018 due to cost-cutting by Aberdeenshire Council. The village now has no public transport.

== See also ==
- Brown Jewel
- Burn of Pheppie
- Frasers of Muchalls
- Mill of Muchalls
