= Gabriel Jacques Surenne =

French-Scottish military historian (1777–1858)

Gabriel Jacques Surenne FSA FASE (1777–1858) was a 19th-century French-born military historian living in Scotland who authored numerous publications in the fields of warfare and battle analysis and also in French grammar.

== Life ==
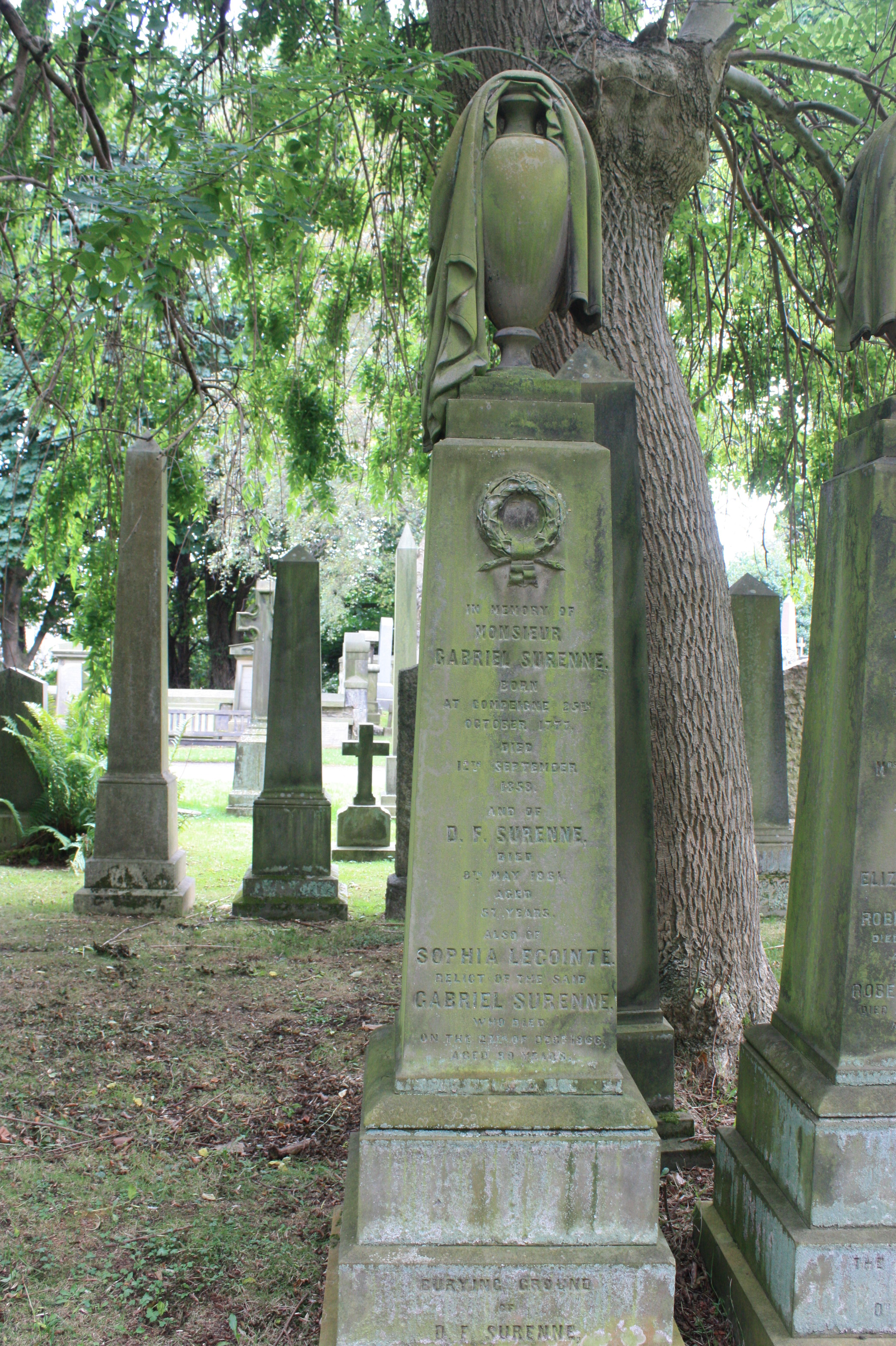
The grave of Gabriel Jacques Surenne, Dean Cemetery, Edinburgh

He was born to Louis Nicolas Surenne (1750-1805), Glazier and Marie-Michell Dez (b. 1752) in Compiegne in France on 24 October 1778 and baptized in the Parish of St Antoine, Compiegne, Oise, Picardie, France on 25 October 1778. His brother George Surenne was born in c1780, his brother Antoine-Marie Stanislas Surenne was born in 1781 in Compiegne, and his sister Marie-Louise was also born in Parish of St Antoine, Compiegne, France.

A newspaper epitaph mentions his war service with Napoleon Bonaparte in his successful Italian Campaigns. This could have been the Battle of Lodi in May 1796, Arcole in November 1796 or Rivoli in January 1797. Gabriel would have been 18 at the commencement of his service.

His early life is unclear other than various references made by himself as to having been trained in Paris. He attended Ecclesiastical College of St Cornell in Compiegne, Oise, Picardie, France. There is a reference in Ancestry.com of rented premises at Vine Street, Picadilly, London that Gabriel used as a retail jeweler's store in partnership with Monsieur Bernaud. He took on George Eades as a goldsmith apprentice on 6 June 1804. ( UK Register of Duties Paid for Apprectices' Indentures 1710-1811) This venture may not have been successful as in 1813 he was called to give a report on his estate (bankruptcy). At that time, he resided in a house owned by David Niven in Dean Street, St Anne, Westminster. The sum of 4 pounds 11 shillings and 8 pence were affixed and exonerated.

He appeared in Edinburgh, Scotland around 1816, and became a teacher and prodigious author of French educational textbooks. He was a member of the French Grammatical Society and the Scottish Antiquarian Society.

He was a founding donor and master at the Scottish Military and Naval Academy, an Edinburgh institution 'for training young men, chiefly for the service of the royal and East India Company's services; Surenne also contributed to the various branches of military education such as fortification, military drawing, gun-drill, and military exercises and French language. The Academy was closed in the late 19th century.

He married Sophia Le Cointe on 2 August 1802 at St James, Picadilly, Westminster, London. This is a large, beautiful light-filled church designed by Sir Christopher Wren. His son Daniel Ferdinand Surenne was born in London on 5 July 1803. His daughter Elizabeth was born in London on 30 August 1807. Elizabeth married Robert Reid, Dental Surgeon on 17 September 1837. His son, Peter was born in London in 1809, and his last son John Thomas Surenne was born on 4 March 1814 in London. On 27 March Gabriel was listed as a jeweler on John's baptism record and lived in 6 New Court, Fleet Market, City of London, England. In 1826 he lived in 12 George Street, Edinburgh, a solid four-storey building. In later life he is listed as living with his wife Sophia and their daughter, Elizabeth Surenne, at 8 Great King Street in Edinburgh's Second New Town, reflecting a fairly noble lifestyle.

He continued to live at 8 Great King Street with his family including his son Daniel F Surenne (1804-1861) who became an art teacher and portrait painter. A second son, became Prof John Surenne. John lived at 66 Great King Street where he taught piano to private students. He also was engaged by a private school as a music master. John was also the organist at the Canongate/Kilwinning Lodge at 23 St John Street, Edinburgh. This is the same Lodge previously attended by Robert Burns, the famous Scottish poet.

On 10 August 1844 Gabriel went to Le Havre, France and returned on 10 August 1844 on board SS Sphinx.

He died at age 79 in Edinburgh on 12 September 1858 of bronchitis and old age. His obituary describes him as a particularly kind and gentle disposition. He is buried in a northwest section of Dean Cemetery with his wife, Sophia Lecointe.

== Theory of Mons Graupius ==
Surenne analysed the noted historic battle of Mons Graupius and concluded in a letter to Sir Walter Scott that the most likely location of this first recorded battle in Scottish history was in the vicinity of Kempstone Hill and the Raedykes Roman Camp.

== Publications ==
- The Pocket French Grammatical and Critical Dictionary (1830)
- Petit Cours de Francais (1831) published by Oliver & Boyd, Edinburgh
- Standard Pronouncing Dictionary of the French and English Languages (1845)
- A Practical Grammar of French Rhetoric (1846)
- New French Dialogues (1851)
- A Genealogical Account of the Royal House of Bruce (1854)
- A New French Manual and Traveller’s Companion
- Dictionary of the French and English Languages

It is unclear if Surenne is also the same as Voltaire Gabriel Surenne who also published books on French military subjects. (Gabriel Jacques Surenne co-wrote Histoire De Charles X11 (1848) with Voltaire (Francois-Marie Arouet))
