= Hare Ness =

Headland landform in Scotland

Coordinates: 57.0893°N 2.0817°W

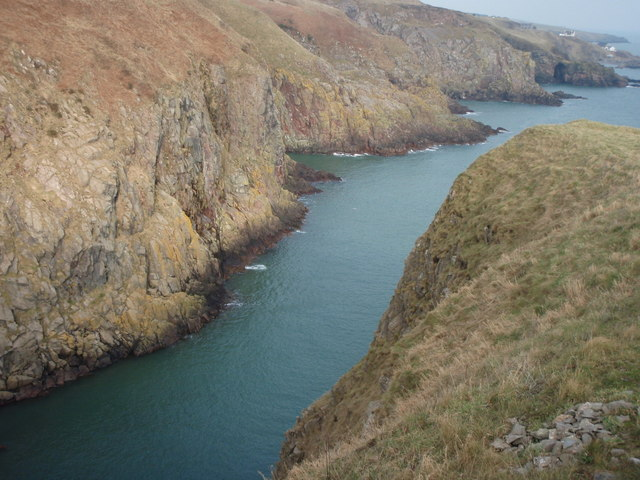
Hare Ness, looking north-north-west

Hare Ness is a headland landform along the North Sea coastline a few miles south of Aberdeen, Scotland.

== History ==
Hare Ness is situated several kilometres west of the ancient Causey Mounth trackway, a medieval road built to create a passable route from Stonehaven to Aberdeen along the coastal points. This ancient passage specifically connected the River Dee crossing (where the present Bridge of Dee is situated) via Portlethen Moss, Muchalls Castle and Stonehaven to the south. The route was that taken by William Keith, 7th Earl Marischal and the Marquess of Montrose when they led a Covenanter army of 9,000 men in the battle of the Civil War in 1639.

== See also ==
- Brown Jewel
- Grim Brigs
