= Limpet Burn =

Watercourse in Aberdeenshire, Scotland

Location
- Country: Scotland

Physical characteristics
- Mouth: North Sea
  - coordinates: 56.99220°N 2.17808°W

Limpet Burn is a watercourse in Aberdeenshire, Scotland whose discharge is deemed part of the North Sea coastal drainage. Prominent geographic features in the vicinity of Limpet Burn are Megray Hill and Kempstone Hill. Notable buildings in proximity to Limpet Burn are Ury House, Muchalls Castle and Chapel of St. Mary and St. Nathalan. Part of the watershed of Limpet Burn has been suggested by some as the site of the first recorded battle in the history of Scotland, the Battle of Mons Graupius.

== See also ==
- Cowie Water
