= Grim Brigs =

Coordinates: 57°00′59″N 2°09′37″W

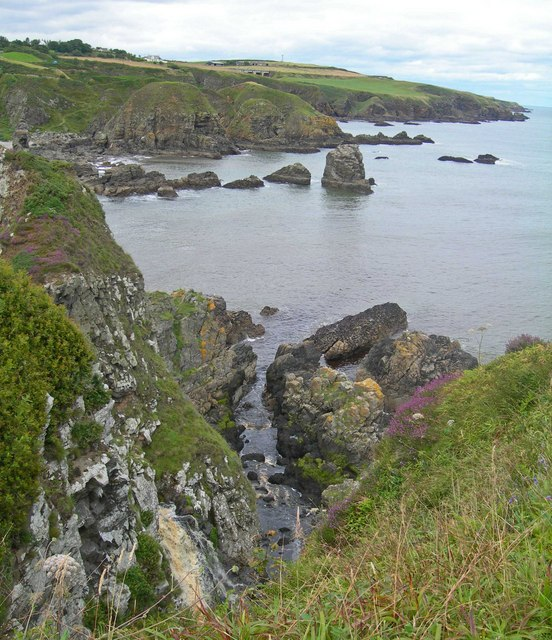
Grim Brigs as seen from Doonie Point. Extreme upper point is Brown Jewel, which lies slightly north of Grim Brigs.

Grim Brigs (Grid reference NO9091) is a rocky headland on the North Sea at Muchalls, Scotland. Notable historic features in this vicinity include St. Ternan's Church, Muchalls Castle and Elsick House. Approximately one kilometre inland is the noted medieval drovers' road known as the Causey Mounth. The geology of Grim Brigs is associated with the harder rock formations north of the Highland Boundary Fault, which forms the boundary between the Scottish Highlands and Lowlands. This Highland Boundary Fault emerges at the North Sea approximately four kilometres south of Grim Brigs near the Chapel of St. Mary and St. Nathalan.

== History ==
Grim Brigs is situated several kilometres east of the ancient Causey Mounth trackway, which road was constructed to make passable this only available medieval route from coastal points south from Stonehaven to Aberdeen. This ancient passage specifically connected the River Dee crossing (where the present Bridge of Dee is situated) via Portlethen Moss, Muchalls Castle and Stonehaven to the south. The route was that taken by William Keith, 7th Earl Marischal and the Marquess of Montrose when they led a Covenanter army of 9000 men in the battle of the Civil War in 1639.

== See also ==
- Hare Ness
