= Bridge of Muchalls =

Hamlet in Aberdeenshire, Scotland

Coordinates: 57.0128°N 2.1791°W

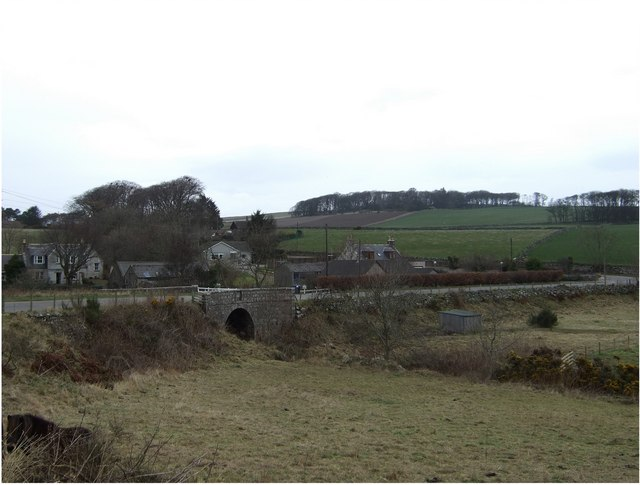
The bridge at Bridge of Muchalls

Bridge of Muchalls is an entirely residential hamlet in Aberdeenshire, Scotland by the North Sea. It is next to the A92 dual carriageway (formerly the A90 road) about three miles north of Stonehaven and to the south of Muchalls Castle.

This small hamlet is known for its picturesque access to the rugged North Sea coastline at Muchalls Beach. The Burn of Muchalls is a stream that flows east through the Bridge of Muchalls before passing under the A92 road and thence to the North Sea slightly to the north of Doonie Point. The ancient Causey Mounth trackway runs north from the now ruin Cowie Castle, past the Hill of Megray and passes over Kempstone Hill before crossing the Burn of Muchalls at the Bridge of Muchalls.

== See also ==
- Fetteresso Castle
- Mill of Muchalls
- Netherley
- Red Moss
