= William Mackie (geologist) =

Scottish physician

William Mackie FRSE DPH LLD (1856–1932) was a Scottish physician and public health specialist, remembered for his contributions to geology.

== Life ==
He was born in Durno in rural Aberdeenshire on 28 April 1856. He was educated at the parish school in Garioch then Old Aberdeen Grammar School.

He studied medicine at Aberdeen University graduating MB ChB in 1888. He spent most of his life in the Elgin area, first as a GP and then as Medical Officer of Health.

In September 1903, Mackie proposed a proto-theory of plate tectonics, "Theory of the Origin of Continents and Ocean Basins", at the 73rd Meeting of the British Association for the Advancement of Science held in Southport. His idea invoked cooling, contraction and differentiation magma leading to a lighter, rigid, continental crust that was then subject to tidal forces in the underlying liquid mantle. These caused the rigid crust to split and be displaced horizontally and 'tidal retardation' caused them to become fixed, with solidification of the intervening magma creating the floor of the ocean basins. He suggested further cooling and a shrinking nucleus led to the oceans basins sinking down and 'elbowing aside' the continental masses, which come to be elevated in lines parallel to and extending along their margins. Yet further cooling caused contraction the elevated lines to be 'thrown into folds and overfolds' forming mountain chains along the margins. Mackie's idea is interesting in its attempt to provide a mechanism for continental drift. Some 20 years later a similar mechanism of forces moving rafting continents on a liquid mantle would be outlined by Arthur Holmes, albeit scientifically refined with a new driving mechanism of heated mantle convection currents.

From 1910 to 1913 he did extensive studies of the Rhynie area in Aberdeenshire and was the first person to discover plant-bearing cherts.

In 1918 he was elected a Fellow of the Royal Society of Edinburgh. His proposers were John Horne, Ben Peach, Sir John Smith Flett and Robert Kidston. Aberdeen University awarded him an honorary doctorate (LLD) for his contributions to Geology in 1923. He was president of the Edinburgh Geological Society from 1925 to 1927. He resigned from the Royal Society of Edinburgh in 1932.

He died in Glasgow on 15 July 1932.

== Works ==
- "The Origin of Oceans and Continents" (1904)
