= Raedykes =

Coordinates: 57.0020°N 2.2632°W

Designations

Scheduled monument
- Official name: Raedykes, Roman camp
- Type: Roman: camp
- Designated: 26 December 1972
- Reference no.: SM1016

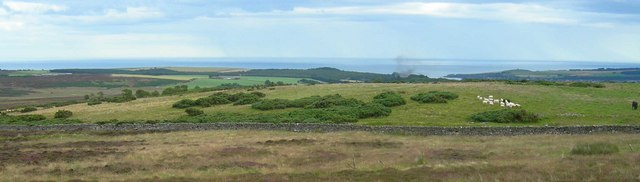
Raedykes Roman Camp viewed from the north.

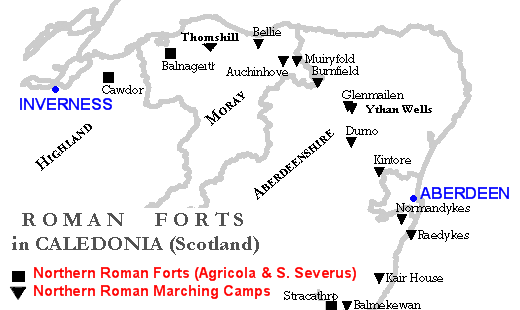
Raedykes Roman Camp is located near Stonehaven, one of a string of Roman forts and marching camps in the northernmost area (Caledonia) of Roman conquest and presence in Britannia

Raedykes is the site of a Roman marching camp located just over three miles (five kilometres) northwest of Stonehaven, Aberdeenshire, Scotland. National Grid Reference NO 842902. It is designated as a scheduled monument. A marching camp was a temporary camp used mainly for overnight stops on a long route between more permanent forts, or as a temporary base while on campaign in hostile territory.

== The site ==
Raedykes probably dates from the late 1st century AD (Agricolan), though it has been argued that it could be Antonine (2nd century) or Severan (early 3rd century). The camp rampart (vallum) encloses the summit and eastern slopes of Garrison Hill (191 m or 627 ft), a prominent spur overlooking the valley of the Cowie Water, a small river draining into the North Sea on the outskirts of Stonehaven. The camp covered an area of about 93 acres (38 hectares), and a computer model suggests that this would have been sufficient to house three full legions, or around 16,000 troops

The entire perimeter of Raedykes camp has been recorded, and is very irregular in shape, because of the terrain. There were six gateways of which five are visible, all protected by titulus outworks; two in the longest (east) side, one in the shortest (south) side, another in the north side and one more in the very irregular southwest side. The Mid Raedykes Farm lies inside the northwest corner of the camp and Broomhill Farm lies just inside the eastern rampart beside the southernmost eastern gateway.

Raedykes is situated a day's march north from Stracathro fort (initially also a marching camp) and a few hours' march south of Normandykes.

== History ==
The Roman army established a chain of forts and camps during the late first century AD at Ardoch, Strageath, Inchtuthil, Battledykes, Stracathro, Raedykes (probably), Normandykes, Glenmailen, Bellie, Balnageith and Cawdor. Many of these forts and camps were reoccupied during the reign of emperor Septimius Severus about a century later.

In the summer of 84 Agricola defeated the massed armies of the Caledonians, possibly led by Calgacus, at the battle of Mons Graupius. The area around Raedykes including nearby Kempstone Hill has been advanced by Gabriel Jacques Surenne and other scholars as the likely location for the battle in 83 or 84 AD. The prominent hill called Bennachie, much further north, overlooking Inverurie near the Roman camp at Durno, is another potential site. However, there is no general agreement about the site of the battle, and no direct evidence to pinpoint it.

== See also ==
- Fetteresso Castle, 14th-century tower house, 3 mi (5 km) south
- Muchalls Castle, 13th-century tower house, 3 mi (5 km) east
- Burn of Muchalls, a scenic stream
- Normandykes, Roman marching camp, 6 mi (10 km) north
- Cawdor (Roman Fort) near Inverness
- Inchtuthil, site of a major Roman legionary fortress, near Blairgowrie
