= Domitia Decidiana =

1st century wife of Roman general, Gnaeus Julius Agricola

Domitia Decidiana was a Roman woman who lived in the 1st century. She was a well-connected woman of illustrious descent.

In 62 she married the Roman general Gnaeus Julius Agricola, who had just recently returned from service in Britain as a military tribune. She gave birth to a son, whose name is not known, in 63, and in 64 to a daughter, Julia Agricola. Not long after Julia's birth, the son died. Julia married the historian Tacitus in 78. Agricola and Domitia had another son in 83, who died within a year.

According to Tacitus, not only did Domitia and Agricola have a very happy marriage, Domitia's connections were useful to her husband's political career. She survived him when he died in 93, and was named as co-heir, along with Julia and the emperor Domitian, in his will.
