= Calgacus =

Caledonian chief at the AD 83 Battle of Mons Graupius

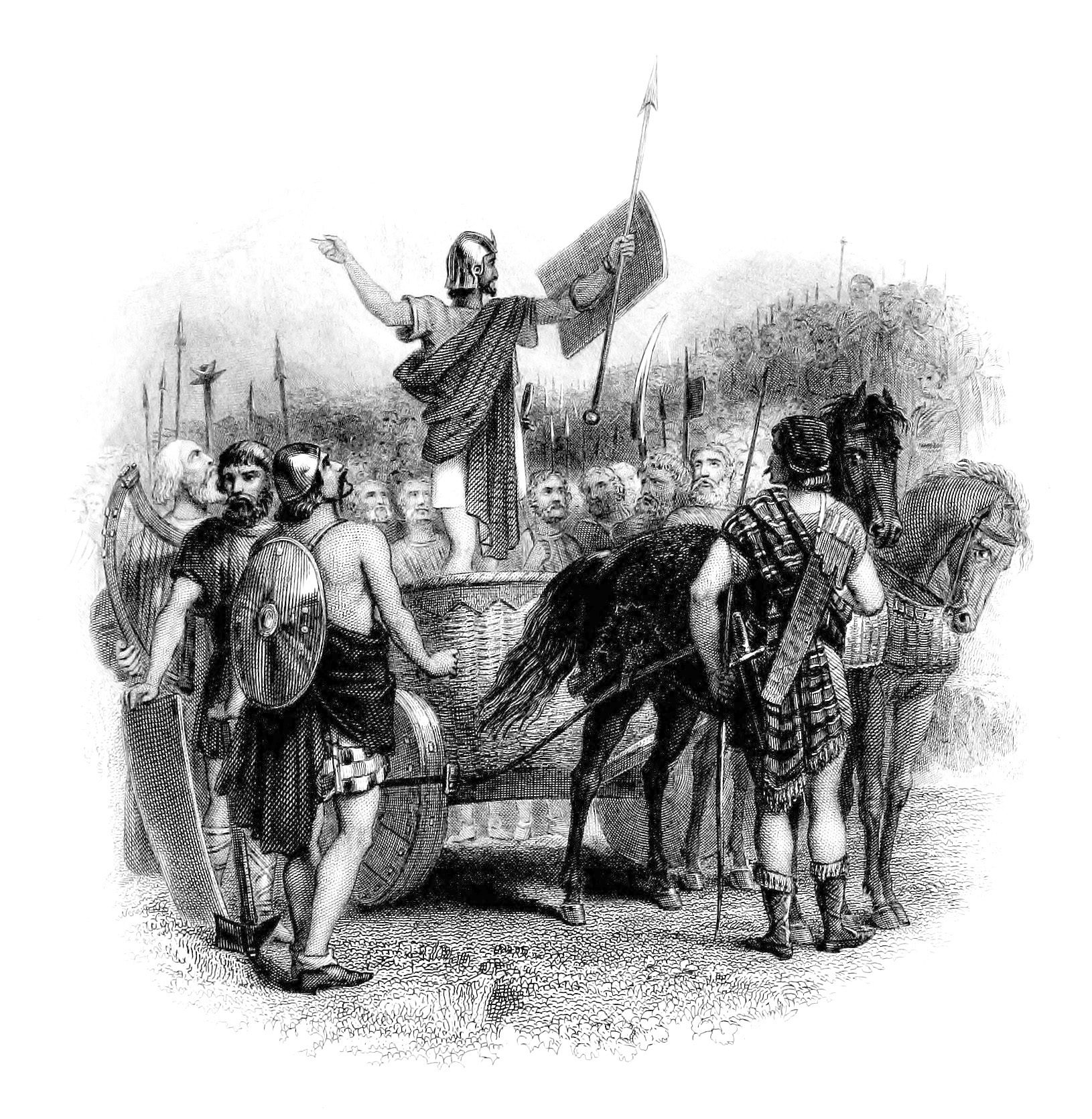
19th-century print depicting Calgacus delivering his speech to the Caledonians.

According to Tacitus, Calgacus (sometimes Calgacos or Galgacus) was a chieftain of the Caledonian Confederacy who fought the Roman army of Gnaeus Julius Agricola at the Battle of Mons Graupius in northern Scotland in AD 83 or 84.

There is debate as to the existence of Calgacus; Anthony Kamm and Simon Turney argue that Calgacus was invented by Tacitus to convey his own political opinions.

== Name ==
The name Calgacus is of Celtic origin and generally taken to mean "swordsman" or "stinger". It appears related to the Old Irish personal name Calgaigh. The first element may be cognate with Old Irish calg ("point"), Breton calc'h ("penis") (all from a root *kalga) with the adjectival suffix *- a:k- (cf. Welsh caliog ("having a penis"); Old Irish golgach). Alternatively, in view of the meaning of the Breton and Welsh words, a name implying virility may be considered (cf. Gaulish names with *busso-, meaning the same).

Whether Calgacus is a personal name or an epithet remains unclear.

== Biography ==
He was the first Caledonian to be recorded in history. The only historical source that features him is Tacitus' Agricola, which describes him as "the most distinguished for birth and valour among the chieftains". Tacitus wrote a speech which he attributed to Calgacus, saying that Calgacus gave it in advance of the Battle of Mons Graupius. The speech describes the exploitation of Britain by Rome and rouses his troops to fight.

The following excerpt is from the speech attributed to Calgacus by the historian Tacitus in the Agricola, but most historians note that since Calgacus was fighting Tacitus' father-in-law, Gnaeus Julius Agricola, in the battle, the reader should assume some bias:

Whenever I consider the origin of this war and the necessities of our position, I have a sure confidence that this day, and this union of yours, will be the beginning of freedom to the whole of Britain. To all of us slavery is a thing unknown; there are no lands beyond us, and even the sea is not safe, menaced as we are by a Roman fleet. And thus in war and battle, in which the brave find glory, even the coward will find safety. Former contests, in which, with varying fortune, the Romans were resisted, still left in us a last hope of succour, inasmuch as being the most renowned nation of Britain, dwelling in the very heart of the country, and out of sight of the shores of the conquered, we could keep even our eyes unpolluted by the contagion of slavery. To us who dwell on the uttermost confines of the earth and of freedom, this remote sanctuary of Britain's glory has up to this time been a defence. Now, however, the furthest limits of Britain are thrown open, and the unknown always passes for the marvellous. But there are no tribes beyond us, nothing indeed but waves and rocks, and the yet more terrible Romans, from whose oppression escape is vainly sought by obedience and submission. Robbers of the world, having by their universal plunder exhausted the land, they rifle the deep. If the enemy be rich, they are rapacious; if he be poor, they lust for dominion; neither the east nor the west has been able to satisfy them. Alone among men they covet with equal eagerness poverty and riches. To robbery, slaughter, plunder, they give the lying name of empire; they make a solitude and call it peace.

Calgacus is not mentioned during or after the battle, and he is not named as one of the hostages Agricola took with him after putting the Caledonians to flight. Both Calgacus and the speech may be figments of Tacitus's invention.

His speech is often quoted as "they make a desert and call it peace".
