= Doonie Point =

Location in Scotland

Coordinates: 57.0108°N 2.1636°W

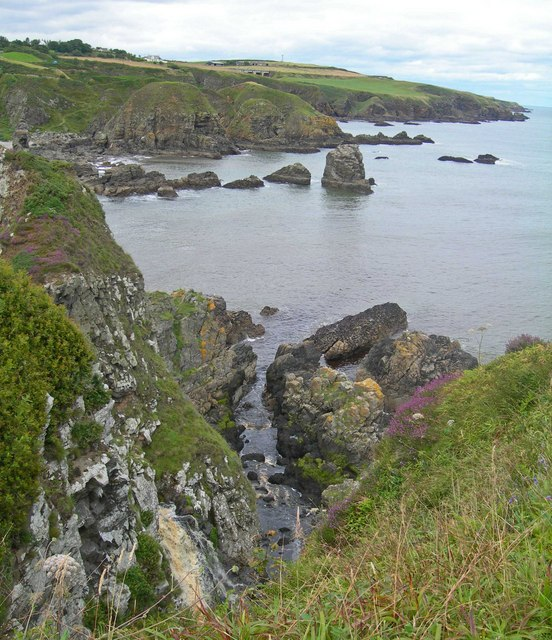
View from Doonie Point looking north along the North Sea coast.

Doonie Point is a rocky headland situated approximately 1.5 kilometres south of the village of Muchalls in Aberdeenshire, Scotland. The clifftop of Doonie Point yields views to the north of Grim Brigs, Brown Jewel and the coast of Newtonhill. To the south are views of the Castle Rock of Muchalls and the rugged North Sea coastline toward Stonehaven. Notable historic structures in the vicinity of Doonie Point are the Chapel of St. Mary and St. Nathalan, Muchalls Castle and the Mill of Muchalls. This site is a recognised rock climbing venue. Doonie Point is catalogued within the marine rescue activities for this part of the coast of northeast Scotland.

== History ==
Doonie Point is slightly east of the ancient Causey Mounth trackway, which road was constructed on high ground to make passable this only medieval route from coastal points south from Stonehaven to Aberdeen. This ancient trackway specifically connects the River Dee crossing (where the present Bridge of Dee is situated) via Portlethen Moss, Muchalls Castle and Stonehaven to the south. The route was that taken by William Keith, 7th Earl Marischal and the Marquess of Montrose when they led a Covenanter army of 9000 men in the battle of the Civil War in 1639.

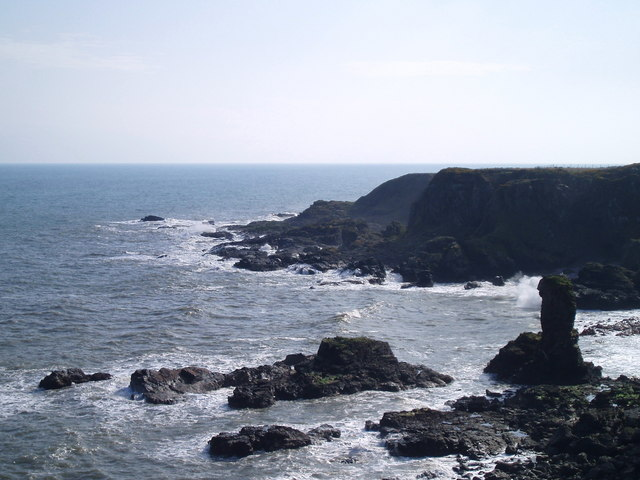
View of Doonie Point from the north
