= Durno =

- Logie Durno
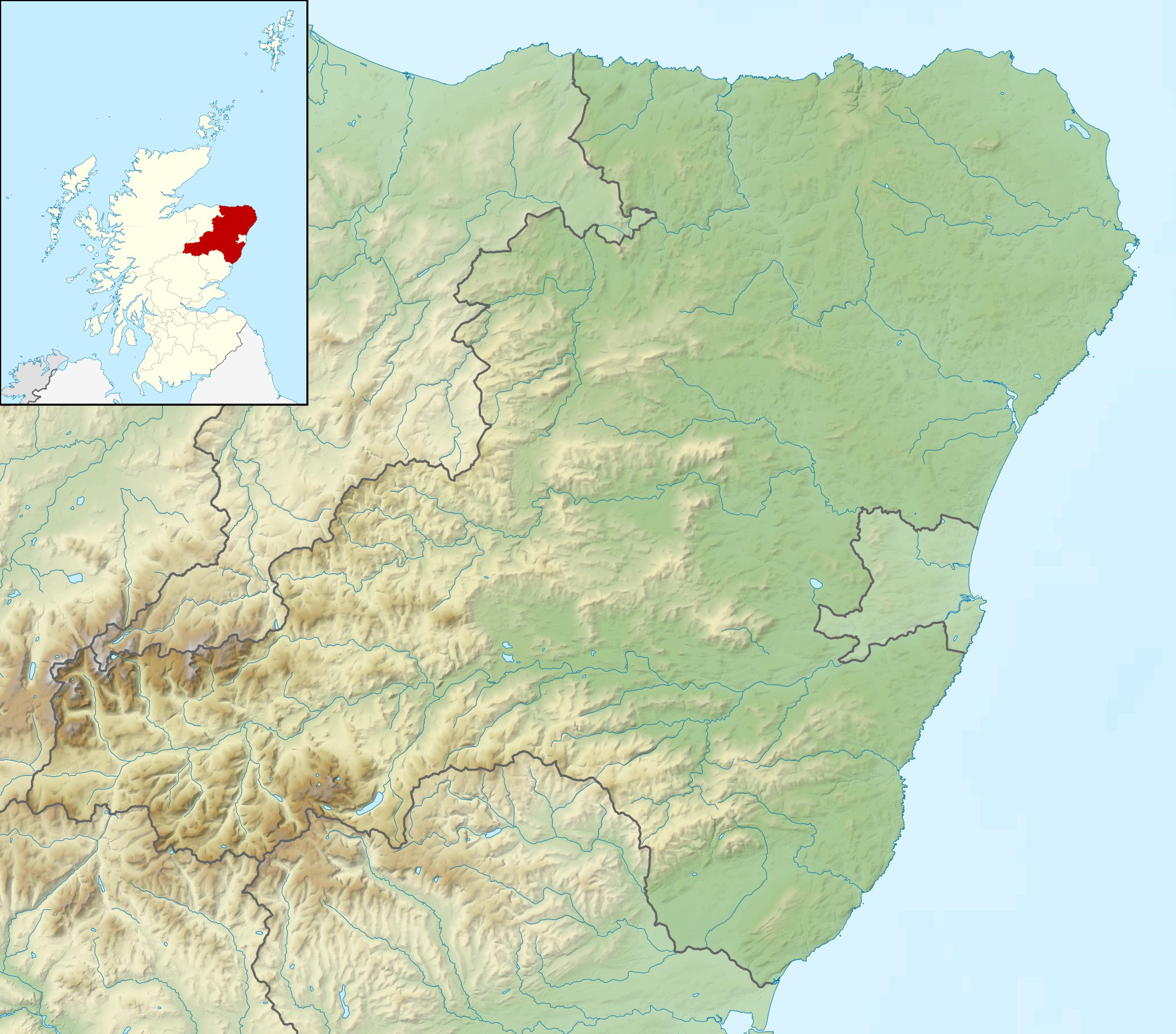
- Location within Aberdeenshire
- 57.3345°N 2.5006°W
- Type: Marching camp

Site notes
- Excavation dates: 1976–1977
- Archaeologists: Kenneth St Joseph
- Condition: Cropmark

Designations

Scheduled monument
- Official name: Durno, Roman temporary camp
- Type: Roman: camp
- Designated: 26 June 1978
- Reference no.: SM4123

Durno or Logie Durno, located 6 miles (9.7 km) north west of Inverurie in Aberdeenshire, Scotland, is the site of a Roman marching camp, first discovered by aerial photography in July 1975 and excavated in 1976 and 1977.

With a total area between 57.2 hectares (141 acres) and 58.4 hectares (144 acres), it is the largest Roman camp that has been found north of the Antonine Wall. The exceptional size of the camp at Durno has led to it being suggested as the place where Agricola assembled his forces before the Battle of Mons Graupius in AD 84, though the evidence for this has been criticised as largely circumstantial.

The camp was enclosed by a ditch 3.35 metres (11.0 ft) wide and 3.35 metres (11.0 ft) deep. The south west side of the camp was 3,230 feet (980 m) long, and the north west side 1,930 feet (590 m) long.

== Notable people ==
- Dr William Mackie FRSE LLD (1856–1932) physician and noted amateur geologist, born here.

== Bibliography ==
- "Logie Durno Roman Camp". Aberdeenshire Sites and Monuments Record. Aberdeenshire Council.
- "Logie Durno". Canmore. Royal Commission on the Ancient and Historical Monuments of Scotland.
- Hanson, W. S. (1980). "Roman campaigns north of the Forth-Clyde isthmus: the evidence of the temporary camps" (PDF). Proceedings of the Society of Antiquaries of Scotland (109): 140–150.
- St Joseph, J. K. (1978). "The Camp at Durno, Aberdeenshire, and the Site of Mons Graupius". Britannia. 9: 271–287. doi:10.2307/525942. JSTOR 525942.
