= Brown Jewel =

Coordinates: 57.0205°N 2.1531°W

The Brown Jewel is a sea stack on the North Sea coast of Scotland, north of the village of Muchalls in Aberdeenshire.

== History ==
Brown Jewel is situated somewhat to the east of the ancient Causey Mounth trackway, which route was constructed on high ground to make passable this medieval passage from coastal points south of Stonehaven to Aberdeen. This passage connected the River Dee crossing (where the present Bridge of Dee is located) via Muchalls Castle and Stonehaven to the south. The route was that taken by William Keith, 7th Earl Marischal and the Marquess of Montrose when they led a Covenanter army of approximately 9000 men into a battle of the Civil War in 1639.

== See also ==
- Burn of Pheppie
- Grim Brigs
- Hare Ness
- May Craig
