= Kempstone Hill =

Landform in Aberdeenshire, Scotland

Coordinates: 56.9978°N 2.1992°W

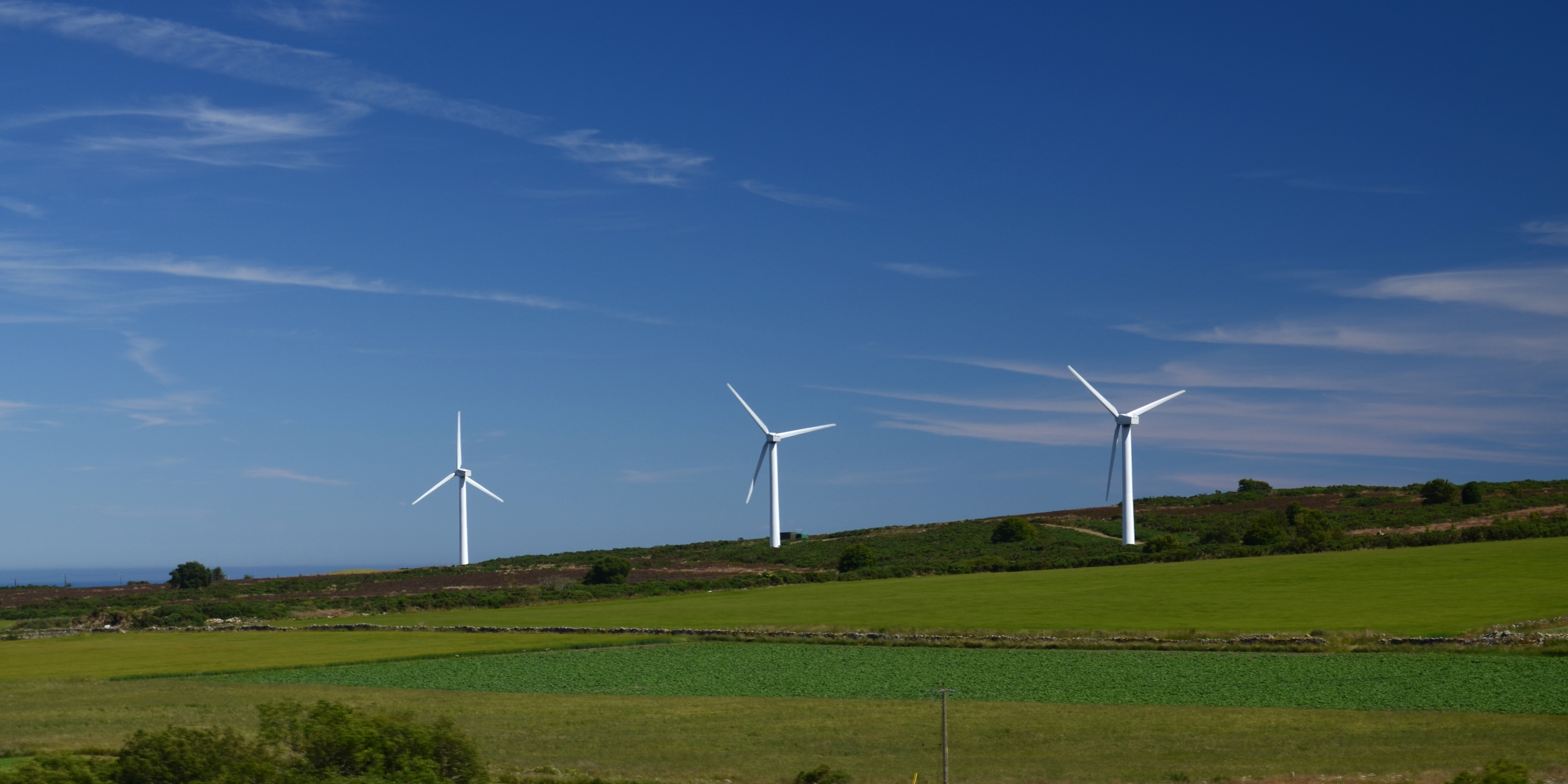
Wind turbines on Kempstone Hill

Kempstone Hill is a landform in Aberdeenshire, Scotland within the Mounth Range of the Grampian Mountains. The peak elevation of this mountain is 132 metres above mean sea level. This hill has been posited by Gabriel Jacques Surenne, Archibald Watt and C.Michael Hogan as the location for the noted Battle of Mons Graupius between the Romans and the indigenous Caledonians. The major Roman Camp of Raedykes is situated about three kilometres to the west. From Kempstone Hill there are fine views to the North Sea facing east and slightly to the north of Muchalls Castle. There is a UK trigpoint installation on Kempstone Hill.

== Geology and hydrology ==
Kempstone Hill is situated approximately 2.3 kilometers to the north of Stonehaven; surface runoff and drainage from the northern and eastern slopes of Kempstone Hill flow north to the Burn of Muchalls. Surface runoff from the south and west flanks flow to the Burn of Monboys, a very slightly alkaline stream These low pH levels (compared to other area streams) may be caused in part by the peat drainage from the moorland on Meikle Carewe Hill and Curlethney Hill. To the south the terrain falls rather sharply descending to Limpet Burn, which watercourse flows to the North Sea. The riparian woodland along Limpet Burn has been classified as high value habitat by the Aberdeenshire Council.

== Prehistory ==
Neolithic traces of civilisation appear on the hill in the form of standing stones. Kemp-stane is Scots to describe prehistoric megalithic structures such as these. Kemp-stane Hill was written in the 18th century.

== Wind farm proposal ==
As of July 2007, Renewable Energy Resources had an application pending before the Aberdeenshire Council to create a windfarm for electrical power generation using Curlethney Hill, Meikle Carewe Hill (hills slightly to the west of Kempstone Hill to install 12 wind turbines. Each turbine would reach a height of 70 metres above grade level, and the entire complex could generate enough power to supply the equivalent of 5,000 homes. Environmental concerns over the proposal included noise pollution, visual impact and ecological disturbance.

== See also ==
- Fetteresso Castle
- Hill of Muchalls
- Megray Hill
