= Agricola (book) =

Book by Tacitus on the life of his father-in-law Gnaeus Julius Agricola

The Agricola (Latin: De vita et moribus Iulii Agricolae, lit. On the life and character of Julius Agricola) is a book by the Roman writer, Tacitus, written c. AD 98. The work recounts the life of his father-in-law Gnaeus Julius Agricola, an eminent Roman general and Governor of Britain from AD 77/78 – 83/84. It also covers the geography and ethnography of ancient Britain.

The text survived in a single codex ascertained by Poggio Bracciolini to be in a German monastery (Hersfeld Abbey). It was eventually secured by the humanist Niccolò de' Niccoli. In modern times, two manuscripts of the Agricola are preserved in the Library of the Vatican. In the late nineteenth and early twentieth centuries, two more manuscripts are said by Duane Reed Stuart to have been brought to light, with one being held by the Chapter Library of the Cathedral at Toledo in Spain and the other being found in 1902 in the private library of Count Balleani of Jesi, in Italy.

== Summary ==
After the assassination of Domitian in AD 96, Tacitus published the Agricola, his first work. In the first three sections of the Agricola, Tacitus discusses the nature of biographies and includes anecdotes on how previous examples have been treated (Tac. Agricola 1–3). Tacitus also comments on the state of the Roman Empire at the time of his writing of the Agricola, stating that the age is not conducive to living in accordance with traditional Roman virtues (Tac. Ag. 1). The fourth section is a summary of Agricola's heritage, which was strong according to Tacitus, his personality, and education, which Tacitus says were well rounded and extensive (Tac. Ag. 4). Tacitus then describes Agricola's military apprenticeship in Britannia, describing how Agricola was helping to deal with tumultuous times in that province, with an uprising having taken place there (Tac. Ag. 5). The subsequent sections discuss Agricola's personal life and professional career prior to his governorship in Britannia (Tac. Ag. 6–9).

In what follows, Tacitus describes the geography and ethnography of Britannia, including a description of the arability of the soil (Tac. Ag. 10–12). Tacitus then describes the origin and events of the revolt of Boudicca, and the following years wherein Vespasian and the governors preceding Agricola subdued Britannia once again (Tac. Ag. 13–17). In section 18, Tacitus reports Agricola's initial campaign as governor of Britannia, telling how he brought the island of Mona (Anglesey) under Roman control with a swift attack (Tac. Ag. 18). In what follows Tacitus describes how Agricola managed the province and ushered in the adoption of the Latin language and Roman customs (Tac. Ag. 19–21). In this section Tacitus addresses the theme of subjugation to the Romans and considers the willing adoption of Roman language and customs a form of slavery rather than civilization (Tac. Ag. 19–21). Subsequently, Tacitus reports the events and military campaigns that Agricola undertook during his third, fourth, and fifth years as governor (Tac. Ag. 22–24). The campaign in Agricola's sixth year as governor is described next, and Tacitus makes a point of discussing Agricola's ability to counter the enemy's plans and turn the tide in his favour (Tac. Ag. 25–27).

In section 28, Tacitus reports the tale of a group of men who had been recruited in Germania and how they mutinied against the Romans and had various adventures before being captured and sold into slavery (Tac. Ag. 28). In what follows, we are told of the background to the battle of Mons Graupius, including the death of Agricola's son (Tac. Ag. 29). Tacitus then reports a long pre-battle speech by one of the leaders of the Britons, called Calgacus (Tac. Ag. 30–32). Following this, Tacitus reports Agricola's own speech (Tac. Ag. 33–34). In what follows, Tacitus describes the course of the battle itself and its immediate aftermath, stating that only nightfall stopped the Romans' pursuit (Tac. Ag. 35–38). Tacitus then reports how the news of Agricola's success in Britannia was received by the emperor Domitian, and Domitian's alleged jealousy of Agricola's military prowess (Tac. Ag. 40–41). Tacitus discusses how Domitian had sent confidants to discover Agricola's intentions in regards to becoming a proconsul of either Asia or Africa, and Domitian's temperament (Tac. Ag. 42). Tacitus, in discussing the end of Agricola's life, says that rumours were voiced in Rome that Agricola was poisoned on the Emperor's orders and that his death was lamented by many (Tac. Ag. 43). After reporting Agricola's death, Tacitus summarizes the circumstances of his birth and his character throughout his life (Tac. Ag. 44). In the final two sections, Tacitus addresses his departed father-in-law directly, honouring him and vowing that Agricola will live on through the story he has told of him (Tac. Ag. 45–46).

== Themes ==
Wolf Liebeschuetz says that a major theme of the Agricola is an illustration of what happens when freedom is entirely forfeited to a despotic ruler. Liebeschuetz suggests that Tacitus's Agricola not only includes an indictment of the reign of Domitian, but a comment on the state of living under the reign of emperors in general, and a lamentation of no longer living in Republican times. An additional observation from Liebeschuetz is that Tacitus addresses the essential loss of freedom of speech that comes with having lived under a tyrant. Professor Katherine Clarke points out that another main purpose of Tacitus's Agricola is simply to honour the deeds of distinguished individuals, and to preserve these deeds and values for future generations to read and learn from.

== Style ==
Janet Bews points out that one style which Tacitus utilizes in the Agricola is the oratorical nature of the sections which discuss the British material, with the style being reminiscent of Cicero. In the section devoted to relating Agricola's time as governor, Clarke reports that two models of historical style can be seen: that of Sallust and Livy. Another author, B. C. McGing, suggests that there is a rhetorical technique that is subtle but nevertheless present in Tacitus called synkrisis, which he uses to draw comparisons between Agricola and other figures.

== See also ==
- De Bello Gallico
