= Taexali =

People on the eastern coast of Britannia Barbara in ancient Scotland

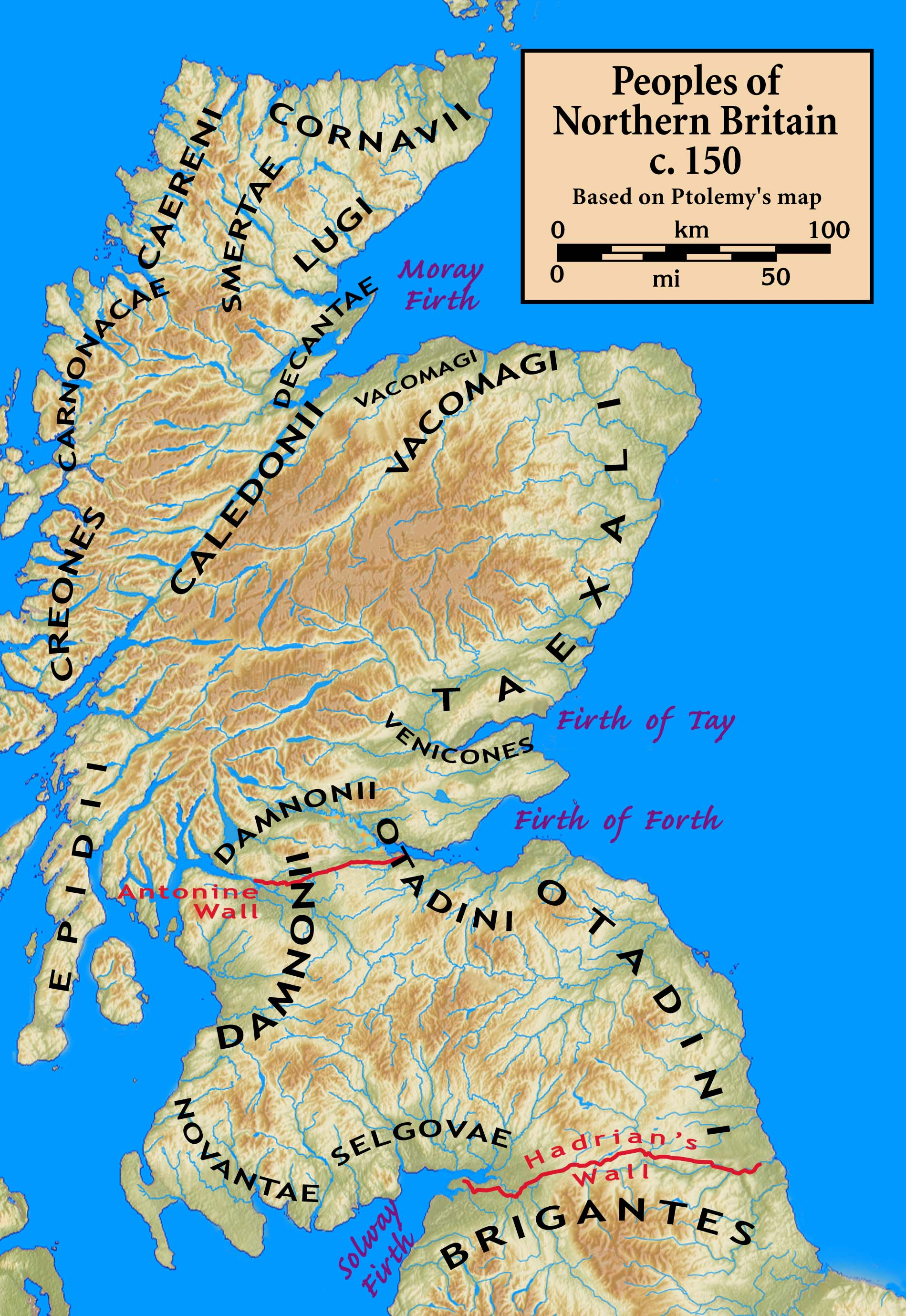

The Taexali (Ancient Greek: Ταίξαλοι) or Taezali (Ancient Greek: Ταίζαλοι) were people on the eastern coast of Britannia Barbara in ancient Scotland, known only from a single mention of them by the geographer Ptolemy c. 150. From his general description and the approximate location of their town or principal place that he called 'Devana', their territory was along the northeastern coast of Scotland and is known to have included Buchan Ness, as Ptolemy refers to the promontory as 'Taexalon Promontory' (Ταίξαλον ἄκρον).

== Name ==
Usually rendered in Latin as Taexali, the name is recorded in Greek sources as Taiksáloi and Taizáloi. It is uncertain which form is primary, and at least one form may be corrupt. Kenneth H. Jackson thought the name to be "non-Celtic". The former reading allows for speculative etymology from Proto-Celtic *tāxs-lo- ("hatchet"). Andrew Breeze derived the name from a cognate of Old Irish taesc ("jet (of blood)"). Derivation from a Celtic word meaning "dough" has also been suggested (cf. Irish taes, Welsh toes).

== See also ==
- List of Celtic tribes
