= Caledonians =

Ancient Celtic peoples of Scotland

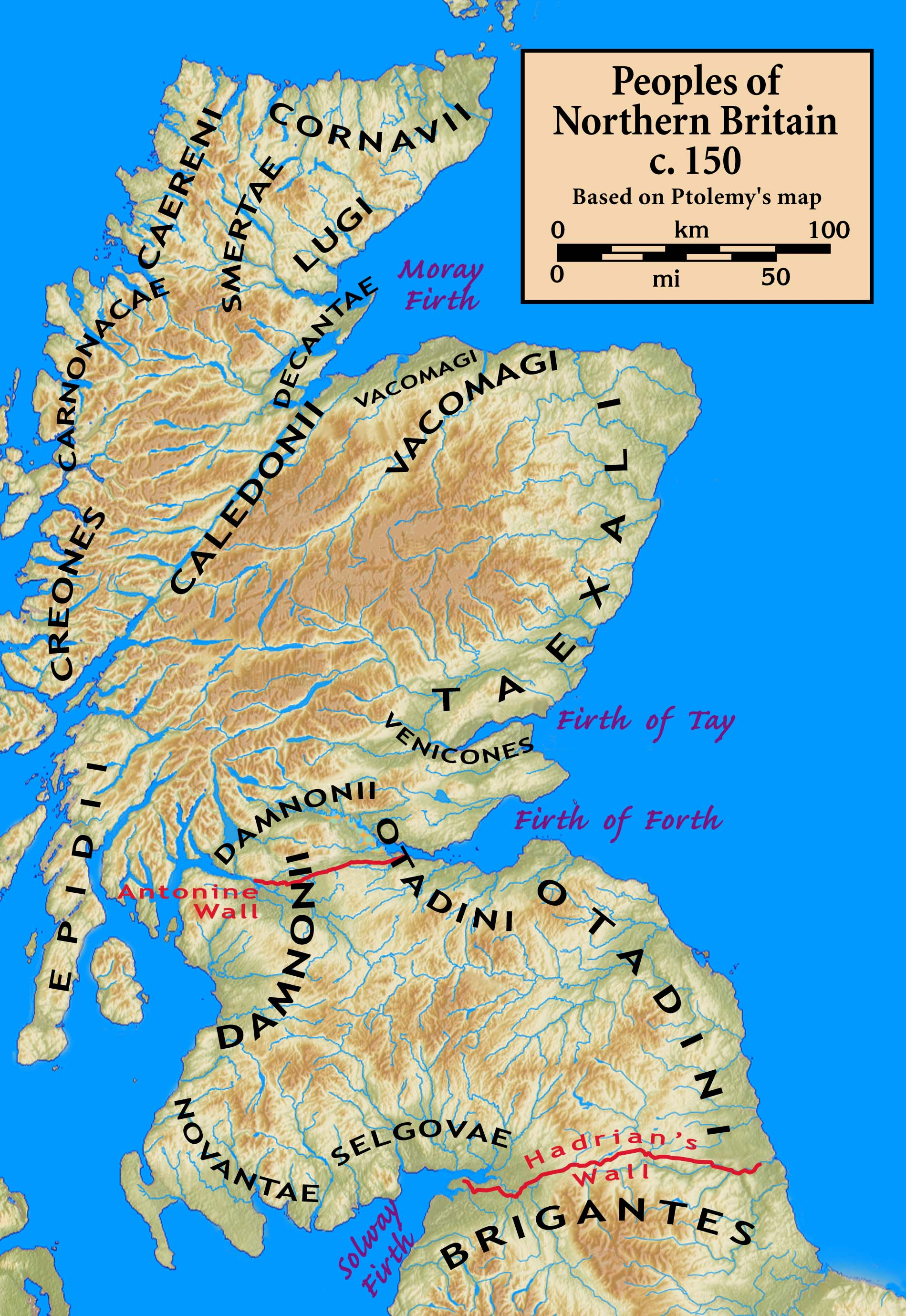
Peoples of Northern Britain according to Ptolemy's 2nd-century Geography

The Caledonians (/ˌkælɪˈdoʊniənz/; Latin: Caledones or Caledonii; Ancient Greek: Καληδῶνες, Kalēdōnes) or the Caledonian Confederacy are believed to be a Brittonic-speaking (Celtic) tribal confederacy in what is now Scotland during the Iron Age and Roman eras. The Greek form of the tribal name gave rise to the name Caledonia for their territory. The Caledonians were considered to be a group of Britons, but later, after the Roman conquest of the southern half of Britain, the northern inhabitants were distinguished as Picts, thought to be a related people who would have also spoken a Brittonic language. The Caledonian Britons were thus enemies of the Roman Empire, which was the state then administering most of Great Britain as the Roman province of Britannia.

The Caledonians, like many Celtic tribes in Britain, were hillfort builders and farmers who defeated and were defeated by the Romans on several occasions. The Romans never fully occupied Caledonia, though several attempts were made. Nearly all of the information available about the Caledonians is based on predominantly Roman sources, which may be biased.

Peter Salway assumes that the Caledonians would have been Pictish tribes speaking a language closely related to Common Brittonic, or a branch of it augmented by fugitive Brythonic resistance fighters fleeing from Roman-occupied Britannia. The Caledonian tribe, after which the historical Caledonian Confederacy is named, may have been joined in conflict with Rome by tribes in northern central Scotland by this time, such as the Vacomagi, Taexali and Venicones recorded by Ptolemy. The Romans reached an accommodation with Brythonic tribes such as the Votadini as effective buffer states.

== Etymology ==
Some 19th‑century antiquarians suggested a Gaelic origin, Coille‑daoine (‘forest‑people’), but this derivation is speculative and not accepted by modern scholarship, which bases its analysis on comparative Celtic methods and does not use Gaelic‑derivative proposals when reconstructing the name’s etymology. In 1824, Scottish antiquarian George Chalmers, who sought to establish a Brittonic (Cymric) identity, posited that the Caledonians were named after their homeland of Caledonia. He hypothesized that the geographic name was derived from Cal-ydon, the name of a Greek province famous for its forests, and that classical writers such as Tacitus later applied this name to the Scottish Highlands as another area of woods. This derivation is no longer accepted by modern linguists.

According to linguist Stefan Zimmer, the land of Caledonia is instead derived from the tribal name Caledones (a Latinization of a Brittonic nominative plural n-stem Calēdones or Calīdones, from earlier *Kalē=Black River=don/Danue Goddess[i]oi). He etymologises this name as perhaps 'possessing hard feet' ("alluding to standfastness or endurance"), from the Proto-Celtic roots *kal- 'hard' and *pēd- 'foot', with *pēd- contracting to -ed-. The singular form of the ethnic name is attested as Caledo (a Latinization of the Brittonic nominative singular n-stem *Calidū) on a Romano-British inscription from Colchester. However, some authors have doubted the link between Calidones and kalet- 'hard', especially in light of the widely rejected theory that the Caledonians and Picts might not have been Celtic speakers.

== History ==
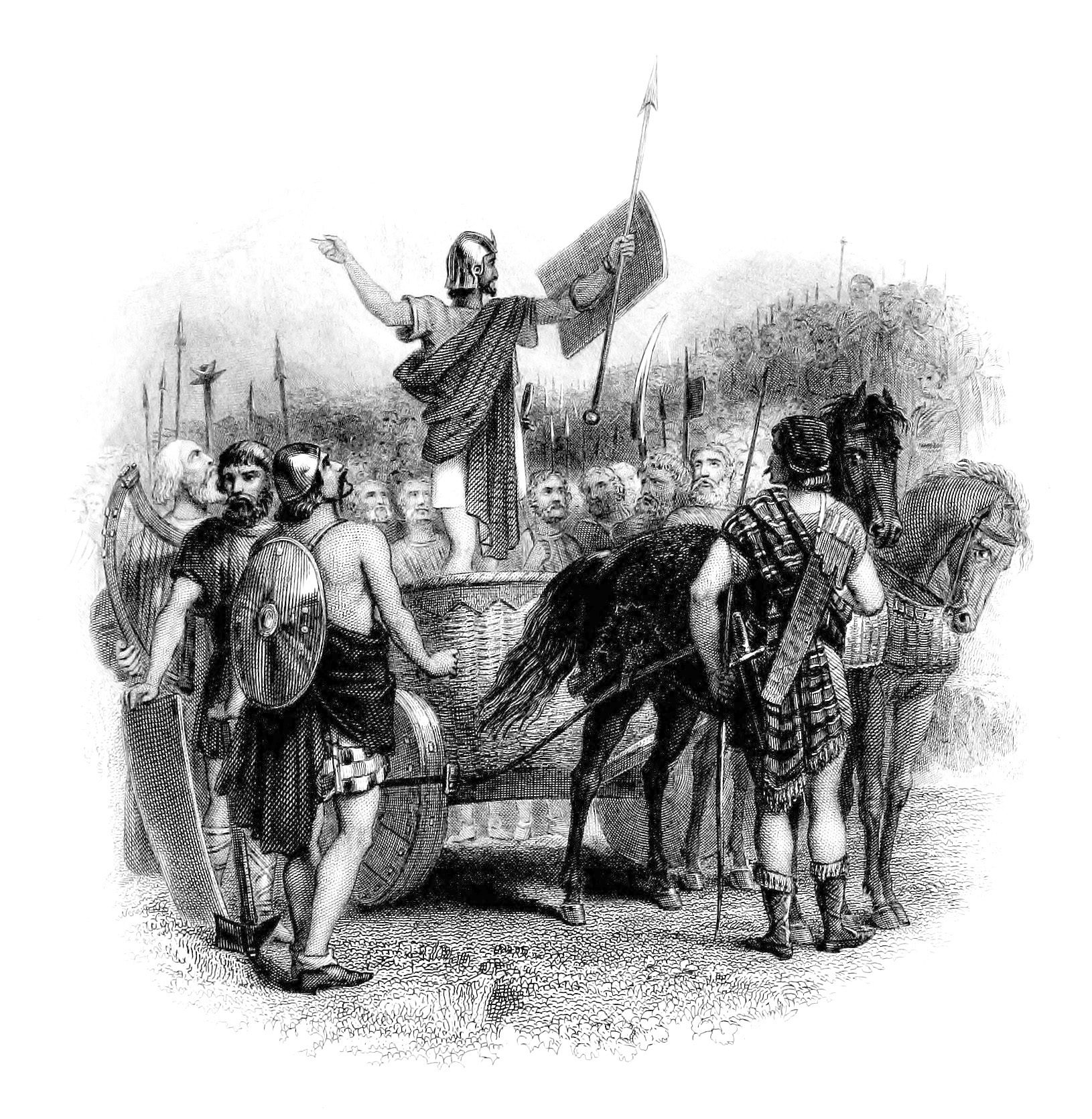
Illustration (18th-century) of the Caledonian leader Calgacus

In AD 83 or 84, the Caledonians, led by Calgacus, were defeated at the hands of Gnaeus Julius Agricola at Mons Graupius, as recorded by Tacitus. Tacitus avoids using terms such as king to describe Calgacus and it is uncertain as to whether the Caledonians had single leaders or whether they were more disparate and that Calgacus was an elected war-leader only. Tacitus records the physical characteristics of the Caledonians as red hair and long limbs.

In 122 AD construction began on Hadrian's Wall, creating a physical boundary between Roman controlled territory, and the land the Romans deemed as Caledonia.

An effort by the Romans to invade and conquer Caledonia was likely made sometime during or shortly after 139 AD. In 142 AD, construction began on the Antonine Wall roughly 100 km North of Hadrian's Wall in order to aid in the Roman push into Caledonian territory and to consolidate their conquest of southern Caledonian territory. The Romans later abandoned this wall (around 158) to return to Hadrian's Wall to the south.

According to Malcolm Todd, the tribes of what is now Northern Britain and Scotland (probably including the Caledones) proved themselves to be "too warlike to be easily contained", leading to the extensive garrisons left by the Romans to contest the tribes. Fraser and Mason argue that the Caledones likely did not directly attack or harass the Romans during this time, but may have had minor conflicts with other tribes.

In AD 180 the Caledonians took part in an invasion of Britannia, breached Hadrian's Wall and were not brought under control for several years, eventually signing peace treaties with the governor Ulpius Marcellus. This suggests that they were capable of making formal agreements in unison despite supposedly having many different chieftains. However, Roman historians used the word "Caledonius" not only to refer to the Caledones themselves, but also to any of the other tribes (both Pictish or Brythonic) living north of Hadrian's Wall, and it is uncertain whether these later were limited to individual groups or wider unions of tribes. It is possible that this was the peoples of Brigantia rather than the Caledones. By the latter half of the 2nd century AD, the actual Caledones would have likely had the Maeatae peoples between themselves and the Antonine Wall. During the reign of Commodus, a series of regular payments appear to have been made to the Caledonians by the Romans, continuing into the first few years of Severus' reign, according to John Casey.

In 197 AD Dio Cassius records that the Caledonians aided in a further attack on the Roman frontier being led by the Maeatae and the Brigantes and probably inspired by the removal of garrisons on Hadrian's Wall by Clodius Albinus. He says the Caledonians broke the treaties they had made with Marcellus a few years earlier (Dio lxxvii, 12).

The governor who arrived to oversee the regaining of control over Britannia after Albinus' defeat, Virius Lupus, was obliged to buy peace from the Maeatae rather than fight them.

According to James Fraser and Roger Mason, by the end of the 2nd century, the majority of Northern tribes had been merged in the Roman consciousness into either the Caledones or the Maeatae, leaving just those two tribes as the representatives of the region. The region itself had long been called Caledonia, and Malcolm Todd states that all residents were called Caledonians, regardless of tribal affiliations.

The Caledonians are next mentioned in 209, when they are said to have surrendered to the emperor Septimius Severus after he personally led a military expedition north of Hadrian's Wall, in search of a glorious military victory. Herodian and Dio wrote only in passing of the campaign but describe the Caledonians ceding territory to Rome as being the result. Cassius Dio records that the Caledonians inflicted 50,000 Roman casualties due to attrition and unconventional tactics such as guerrilla warfare. Dr. Colin Martin has suggested that the Severan campaigns did not seek a battle but instead sought to destroy the fertile agricultural land of eastern Scotland and thereby bring about genocide of the Caledonians through starvation.

By 210 however, the Caledonians had re-formed their alliance with the Maeatae and joined their fresh offensive. A punitive expedition led by Severus' son, Caracalla, was sent out with the purpose of slaughtering everyone it encountered from any of the northern tribes. David Shotter mentions Caracalla's dislike for the Caledonians and his wish to see them eradicated. Severus meanwhile prepared for total conquest but was already ill; he died at Eboracum (modern day York) in Britannia in 211. Caracalla attempted to take over command but when his troops refused to recognise him as emperor, he made peace with the Caledonians and retreated south of Hadrian's Wall to press his claim for the imperial title. Sheppard Frere suggests that Caracalla briefly continued the campaign after his father's death rather than immediately leaving, citing an apparent delay in his arrival in Rome and indirect numismatic and epigraphic factors that suggest he may instead have fully concluded the war but that Dio's hostility towards his subject led him to record the campaign as ending in a truce. Malcolm Todd however considers there to be no evidence to support this. Peter Salway considers that the pressures on Caracalla were too high, and security of the Romans' northern frontier were secure enough to allow their departure. Nonetheless the Caledonians did retake their territory and pushed the Romans back to Hadrian's Wall.

In any event, there is no further historical mention of the Caledonians for a century save for a c. AD 230 inscription from Colchester which records a dedication by a man calling himself the nephew (or grandson) of "Uepogenus, [a] Caledonian". This may be because Severus' campaigns were so successful that the Caledonians were wiped out; however this is highly unlikely.

In 305, Constantius Chlorus re-invaded the northern lands of Britain although the sources are vague over their claims of penetration into the far north and a great victory over the "Caledones and others" (Panegyrici Latini Vetares, VI (VII) vii 2). The event is notable in that it includes the first recorded use of the term 'Pict' to describe the tribes of the area.

== Physical appearance ==
Tacitus in his Agricola, chapter XI (c. 98 AD) described the Caledonians as red haired and large limbed, which he considered features of Germanic origin: "The reddish (rutilae) hair and large limbs of the Caledonians proclaim a German origin". Jordanes in his Getica wrote something similar:

The inhabitants of Caledonia have reddish hair and large loose-jointed bodies.

Eumenius, the panegyrist of Constantine Chlorus, wrote that both the Picts and Caledonians were red haired (rutilantia). Scholars such as William Forbes Skene noted that this description matches Tacitus' description of the Caledonians as red haired in his Agricola.

James E. Fraser argues that Tacitus and other Romans were aware of methods of Caledonians dyeing their hair in order to achieve the stereotypical red colour, and that it was likely misinterpreted as an ethnic identifier. Fraser also mentions that the pressure put on the Northern tribes, forcing them to move, may have led to the creation of identifiers specific to certain tribes, such as clothing or jewellery; some of the earliest examples of such identifiers include armlets, earrings, and button covers, as well as decorated weaponry.

== Archaeology ==
There is little direct evidence of a Caledonian archaeological culture but it is possible to describe the settlements in their territory during their existence.

The majority of Caledonians north of the Firth of Forth would likely have lived in villages without fortifications in houses of timber or stone, while those living nearer to the Western coast would have more likely been using a form of dry stone. According to Malcolm Todd, "'substantial houses' of the North may be over-represented in the archaeological record, by reason of their ability to more successfully survive as recognisable structures."

The hillforts that stretched from the North York Moors to the Scottish Highlands are evidence of a distinctive character emerging in northern Great Britain from the Middle Iron Age onwards. They were much smaller than the hillforts further south, often less than 10,000 square metres in area (one hectare, about 2.47 acres), and there is no evidence that they were extensively occupied or defended by the Caledonians, who appear to generally have had a dispersed settlement pattern.

By the time of the Roman invasion there had been a move towards less heavily fortified but better sheltered farmsteads surrounded by earthwork enclosures. Individual family groups likely inhabited these new fortified farmsteads, linked together with their neighbours through intermarriage.

The reason for this change from hilltop fortresses to farms amongst the Caledonians and their neighbours is unknown. Barry Cunliffe considers that the importance of demonstrating an impressive residence became less significant by the second century because of falling competition for resources due to advances in food production or a population decline. Alternatively, finds of Roman material may mean that social display became more of a matter of personal adornment with imported exotica rather than building an impressive dwelling.

Anne Robertson suggests that the Roman objects and materials (including relative finery and currency) found within many Caledonian structures indicates a trade network between the two cultures from as early as the first century AD, continuing until at least the fourth century AD.

== See also ==
- Cruthin (In Ireland; possible descendants, predecessors or relatives of the Caledonians)
- Dicalydones
- The Mark of the Horse Lord

== Bibliography ==
- Cunliffe, B, Iron Age Britain, Batsford, London, 2004, ISBN 0-7134-8839-5
- Frere, S, Britannia, Routledge, London, 1987, ISBN 0-7102-1215-1
- Moffat, Alistair (2005) Before Scotland: The Story of Scotland Before History. London. Thames & Hudson. ISBN 0-500-05133-X
- Salway, P, Roman Britain, OUP, Oxford, 1986
- Todd, M, Roman Britain, Fontana, London, 1985. ISBN 0-00-686064-8
