= Battle of Mons Graupius =

AD 83 Roman victory in modern Scotland

- Part of the Roman conquest of Britain
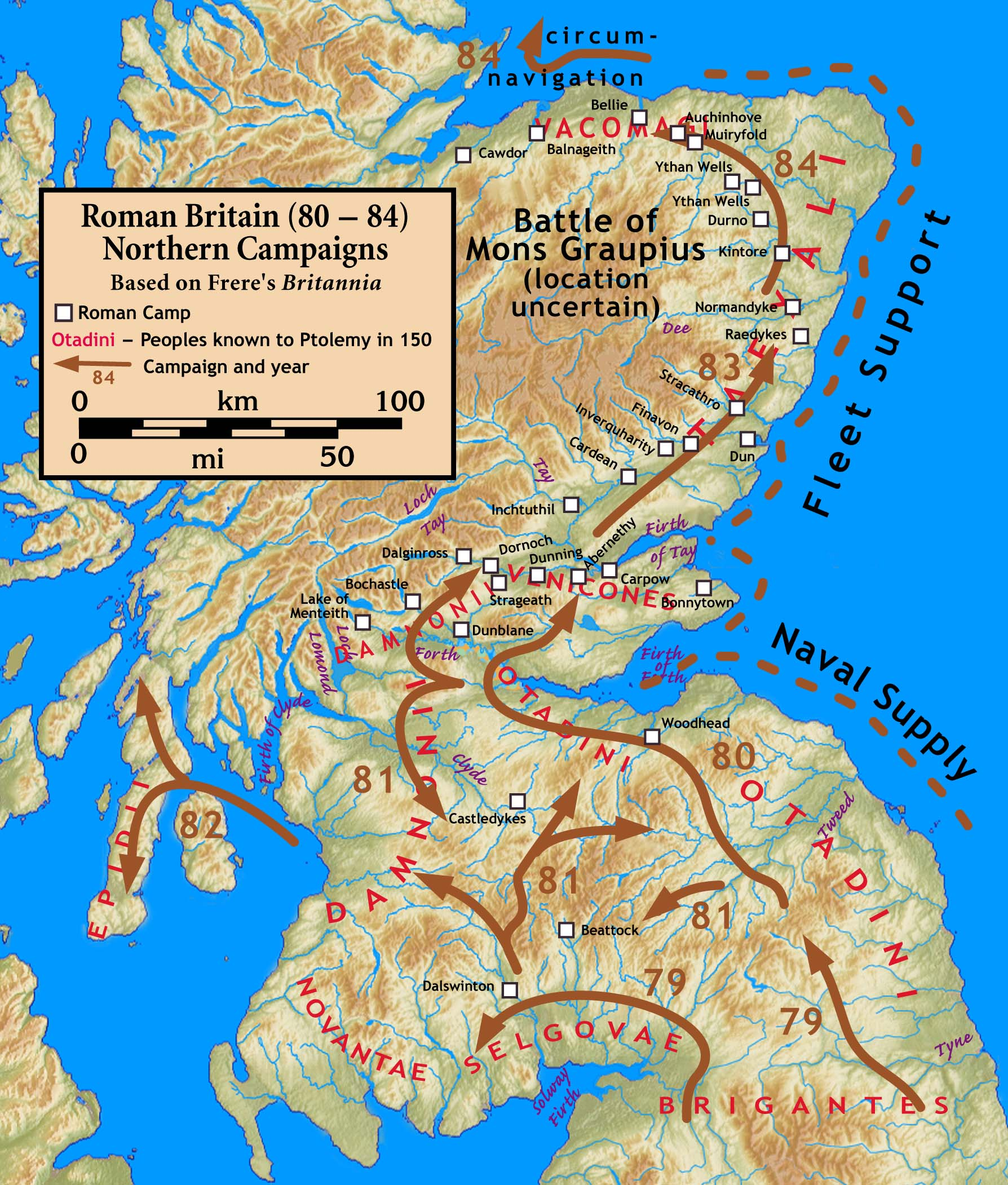
Date	AD 83 (or 84)
Location	North-east Scotland
Result	Roman victory

Belligerents
Roman Empire	Caledonian Confederacy

Commanders and leaders
Agricola	Calgacus

Strength
17,000–30,000+	15,000–30,000+

Casualties and losses
360 dead	10,000 dead

The Battle of Mons Graupius was, according to Tacitus, a Roman military victory in what is now Scotland, taking place in AD 83 or, less probably, 84. The exact location of the battle is a matter of debate. Historians have long questioned some details of Tacitus's account of the fight, suggesting that he exaggerated Roman success.

== Background ==
Tacitus states that Gnaeus Julius Agricola, who was the Roman governor and Tacitus's father-in-law, had sent his fleet ahead to panic the Caledonians, and, with light infantry reinforced with British auxiliaries, reached the site, which he found occupied by the enemy.

Even though the Romans were outnumbered in their campaign against the tribes of Britain, they often had difficulty getting their foes to face them in open battle. The Caledonii were the last unconquered British tribe (and were never entirely subdued). After many years of avoiding the fight, the Caledonians were forced to join battle when the Romans marched on the main granaries of the Caledonians, just as they had been filled from the harvest. The Caledonians had no choice but to fight or starve over the next winter.

== Location ==
The Battle of Mons Graupius has been a constant motif in the study of Roman Scotland. In the 19th century, it was identified with almost every principal Roman site in Perth and Kinross from Dalginross to Blairgowrie. With the advent of aerial photography and the interpretation of crop markings in the 20th century, the focus has moved to the north-east and a series of marching camps en route to the Moray coast. This has given rise to the belief that the battle occurred in Aberdeenshire at the foot of Bennachie, a very distinctive hill just south of a large marching camp at Logie Durno.

Considerable debate and analysis have been conducted regarding the battle location, with the locus of most of these sites spanning Perthshire to the north of the River Dee, all in the northeast of Scotland. A number of authors have reckoned the battle to have occurred in the Grampian Mounth within sight of the North Sea. In particular, Roy, Watt, Hogan and others have advanced notions that the high ground of the battle may have been Kempstone Hill, Megray Hill or other knolls near the Raedykes Roman Camp.

Those sites in Aberdeenshire fit the historical descriptions of Tacitus and have also yielded archaeological finds related to Roman presence. In addition, these points of high ground are proximate to the Elsick Mounth, an ancient trackway used by Romans and Caledonians for military manoeuvres. Bennachie in Aberdeenshire, the Gask Ridge not far from Perth, and Sutherland have also been suggested.

Historic Environment Scotland noted the uncertainty of the location as the reason for its exclusion from the Inventory of Historic Battlefields in Scotland.

== Battle ==
Tacitus describes the battle and gives the numbers of combatants in chapters 29–35 of Agricola. According to Tacitus, 8,000 allied auxiliary infantry formed the centre, while 3,000 cavalry were on the flanks, with the Roman legionaries as a reserve in front of their camp. Estimates for the size of the Roman army range from 17,000 to 30,000; although Tacitus says that 11,000 auxiliaries were engaged, along with a further four squadrons of cavalry, the number of legionaries in reserve is uncertain. The Caledonian army, which Tacitus claims was led by Calgacus (but only mentions him as giving a speech, probably fictitious), was said to be over 30,000 strong. It was stationed mostly on higher ground; its front ranks were on the level ground, but the other ranks rose in tiers, up the slope of the hill in a horseshoe formation. The Caledonian chariotry charged about on the level plain between the two armies.

After a brief exchange of missiles, Agricola ordered auxiliaries to launch a frontal attack on the enemy. These were based around four cohorts of Batavians and two cohorts of Tungri swordsmen. The Caledonians were cut down and trampled on the lower slopes of the hill. Those at the top attempted an outflanking movement but were themselves outflanked by Roman cavalry. The Caledonians were then comprehensively routed and fled for the shelter of nearby woodland, but were relentlessly pursued by well-organised Roman units.

It is said that the Roman Legions took no part in the battle, being held in reserve throughout. According to Tacitus, 10,000 Caledonian people died at a cost of only 360 auxiliary troops. 20,000 Caledonians retreated into the woods, where they fared considerably better against pursuing forces. Roman scouts were unable to locate the remaining Caledonian forces the next morning.

In a conjectural description of the battle by Hector Boece (1465–1536), it was a hard and closely fought battle in which:

The Roman army would have been destroyed... had not a cohort of Germans come to the rescue, enlisted and transported to Britain by command of Caesar... The struggle that followed was atrocious, with the confederates fighting with far more violence than martial skill. Then Agricola sent in a cohort previously held in reserve, which he had been saving for sudden emergencies, to confront these fierce fighters. But the confederates, remaining in the battle-line with indescribable stubbornness, could not be budged. A sad, wretched spectacle ensued, with the confederate wounded falling on top of their dead comrades. Some voluntarily exposed themselves to their executioners, and others escaped their enemy only to commit suicide. Everywhere you could see human limbs, weapons, bodies, and blood-soaked earth. The battle continued in this manner until night deprived the combatants of their ability to see. Then the signal for retreat was sounded, and both sides retired.

— Hector Boece, Scotorum Historia, IV.54 (1527)

== Criticisms of Tacitus's account ==
Tacitus published his account in Agricola some years later, after the assassination of Domitian in the year 96. The decisive victory later reported by Tacitus has been criticized by some historians like Hector Boece (1536), possibly due to a nationalistic reinterpretation. However, one author has suggested that the emperor Domitian may have been informed of the fraudulence of Agricola's own claims to have won a significant victory. Despite this suggestion, Agricola was awarded triumphal honours and was offered another governorship in a different part of the empire, so it would seem unlikely that Domitian doubted he had achieved substantial successes. Suggestions that he invented the entire episode and was thereafter shunned by the emperor do not seem likely, given that he was awarded honours on his return.

== Aftermath ==
Following this final battle, it was proclaimed that Agricola had finally subdued all the tribes of Britain. Soon afterwards he was recalled to Rome, and his post passed to Sallustius Lucullus. It is likely that Rome intended to continue the conflict, but that military requirements elsewhere in the empire necessitated a troop withdrawal and the opportunity was lost.

Although Agricola's campaign effectively brought the whole of present-day Scotland under Roman control, the occupation was brief. The Romans showed little interest in permanently colonizing the northern territories, which they considered poor in resources and strategically less valuable compared to southern Britain. Within a few years, Roman forces had withdrawn to the line of the Forth–Clyde isthmus, abandoning most of Caledonia.

Tacitus' statement in his account of Roman history between 68 AD and 98 AD: "Perdomita Britannia et statim missa" ("Britain was completely conquered and immediately let go"), denotes his bitter disapproval of Domitian's failure to unify the whole island under Roman rule after Agricola's successful campaign.

== See also ==
- Scotland during the Roman Empire
