= Burn of Muchalls =

Stream in Aberdeenshire, Scotland

Location
- Country: Scotland

Physical characteristics
- Mouth: North Sea
  - coordinates: 57.01249°N 2.16249°W

The Burn of Muchalls is an easterly flowing stream in Aberdeenshire, Scotland that discharges to the North Sea. Its point of discharge is on a rocky beach set with scenic sea stacks. Flowing principally over agricultural lands, the Burn of Muchalls traverses through the hamlet of the Bridge of Muchalls, flows beneath the A90 road and thence to the rugged shoreline of the North Sea slightly to the south of Doonie Point. Just above the discharge to the North Sea is a scenic pool, used in the drowning scene of Ophelia in the Franco Zeffirelli film Hamlet. A northern fork of the Burn of Muchalls flows over lands of Muchalls Castle prior to the confluence with the mainstem Burn of Muchalls within the Bridge of Muchalls.

== History ==
In the Middle Ages the only coastal land route, the over the Mounth, the Causey Mounth, crossed the Burn of Muchalls at the Bridge of Muchalls.

Near the mouth of the Burn of Muchalls is an old mill that earlier functioned to harness the power of the burn. There is also a fisherman's stone bothy on the cliffs near the burn overlooking the North Sea.

== See also ==
- Hill of Muchalls
- Limpet Burn
- Netherley
- Red Moss
