= Scotland in the Iron Age =

Scotland in the Iron Age concerns the period of prehistory in Scotland from about 800 BCE to the commencement of written records in the early Christian era. As the Iron Age emerged from the preceding Bronze Age, it becomes legitimate to talk of a Celtic culture in Scotland. It was an age of forts and farmsteads, the most dramatic remains of which are brochs some of whose walls still exceed 6.5 m (21 ft) in height. Pastoral farming was widespread but as the era progressed there is more evidence of cereal growing and increasing intensification of agriculture. Unlike the previous epochs of human occupation, early Iron Age burial sites in Scotland are relatively rare although monasteries and other religious sites were constructed in the last centuries of the period. The Stirling torcs are amongst examples of high quality crafts produced at an early date and the Pictish symbol stones are emblematic of later times.

Some authorities consider the Iron Age to have ended with the first century invasions by the Romans. However much of Scotland remained outside of the Roman world and after the departure of the legions the Celtic Iron Age way of life, often troubled but never extinguished by Rome, re-asserted itself for several centuries more.

== Chronology and sources ==
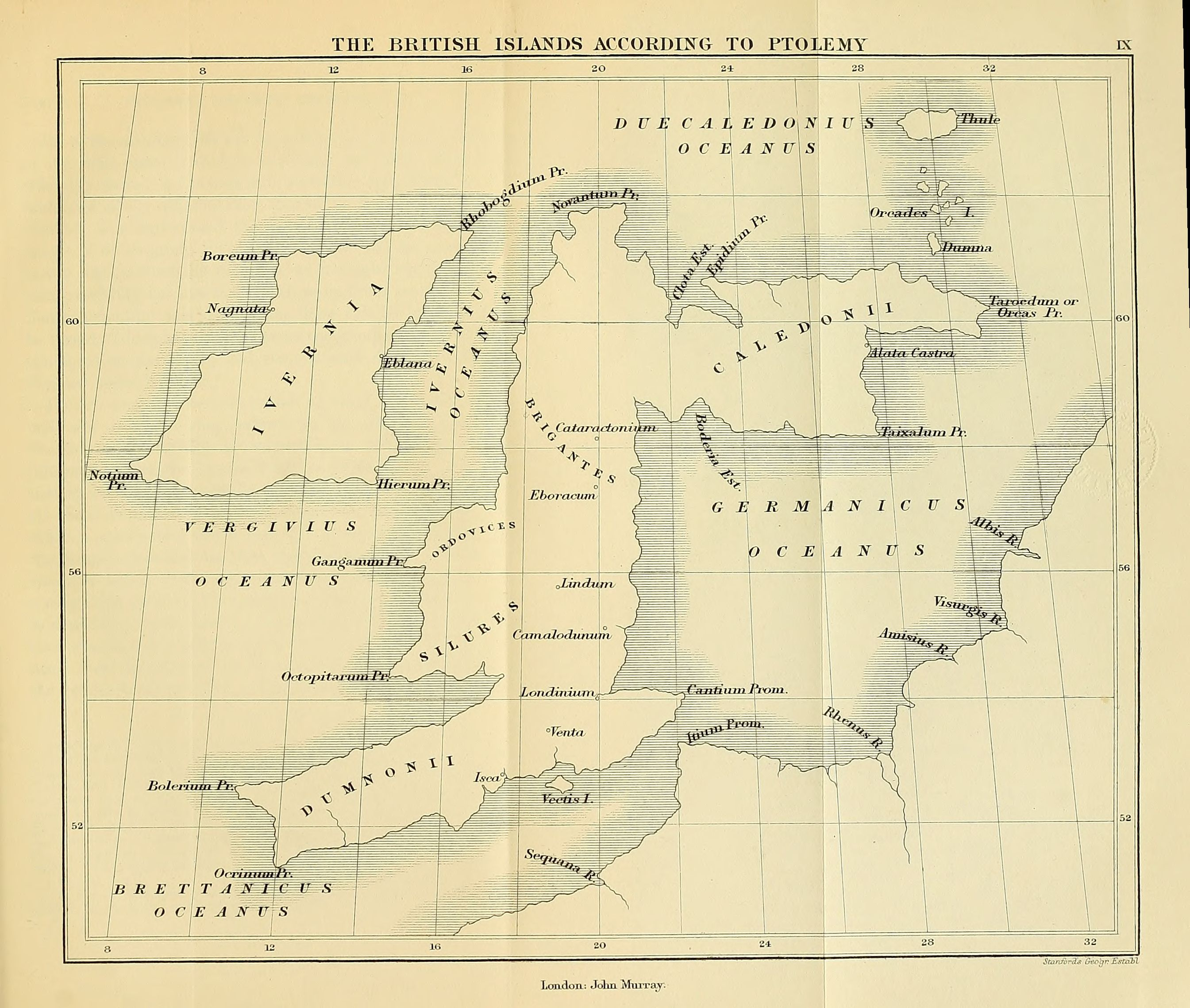
Map drawn from Claudius Ptolemy's cartographic works, showing his rotation of Caledonia to the east. From Edward Bunbury's A History of Ancient Geography Among the Greeks and Romans (1879)

There is no accepted chronology for the Scottish Iron Age. There is some consensus that it begins circa 800 BCE (Note: "For now it would seem reasonable to use 800 BC as a useful marker for the beginning of the Iron Age".) and clearly extends into early Roman times, but the terminus is a subject of debate. Some archaeologists use a scheme known as the "Long Iron Age" which lasts until the late first millennium invasions by the Norse, rather than those of the Roman army. This term is particularly useful in the context of the Hebrides and Northern Isles but elsewhere there is potential overlap with the early historic period. (Note: "The late Iron Age in northern Scotland is a period which traditionally extends from the decline of the brochs... through to the dramatic beginnings of the Viking Age.") The approach taken here is to include the whole of modern Scotland up to the temporary occupation by Roman forces, cover the period of Roman Empire's occupation briefly and then concentrate on Pictland in the north and west that remained largely Iron Age in nature beyond that period.

The period is essentially prehistoric with archaeology playing the predominant role in its study. However, radiocarbon dating for this period is problematic and chronological sequences are poorly understood as a result. There are few contemporary written sources made by those who lived in what is now Scotland and none at all until the early Christian era. (Note: Whether or not there are any such sources depends on the defined terminus of Scottish Iron Age. Anderson lists various sources from the commencement of the sixth century but the Picts left no written evidence of their own.) There are however a few records made by classical authors in Latin and Ancient Greek.

Pytheas of Massilia visited Britain – probably sometime between 322 and 285 BCE – and described it as triangular in shape, with a northern tip called Orcas. Writing in the 1st century CE, the Roman geographer Pomponius Mela called the islands of Orkney Orcades, as did Tacitus in 98 CE, claiming that his father-in-law Agricola had "discovered and subjugated the Orcades hitherto unknown", (although both Mela and Pliny the Elder had previously referred to the islands, the latter mentioning the Caledonian Forest). (Note: Thomson is sceptical about Tacitus's claims on behalf of Agricola in relation to Orkney.) Demetrius of Tarsus was commissioned by Rome to sail to the islands closely surrounding Britain, possibly as part of Agricola's campaign. His report, which may have been primarily about the Hebrides, recorded that these islands were largely uninhabited, often named after spirits or heroes, and that those who did live on them were all holy men. Writing about 70 years later, in 140-150 CE, Ptolemy, drawing on the naval expeditions of Agricola and most likely the earlier explorers, created a map and identified numerous tribal territories throughout Britain (see details below). (Note: Breeze (2002) quotes J.J. Tierney who believed that Ptolemy's information about Scotland "was extremely poor" and that it was unlikely Agricola's fleet provided much new evidence.) However, Ptolemy's information about the interior north of the Great Glen is sparse.

The later Pictish period is similarly devoid of contemporary, local written material. Evidence has however been gleaned from annals preserved in Wales and Ireland and from sources written down much later.

== Society ==
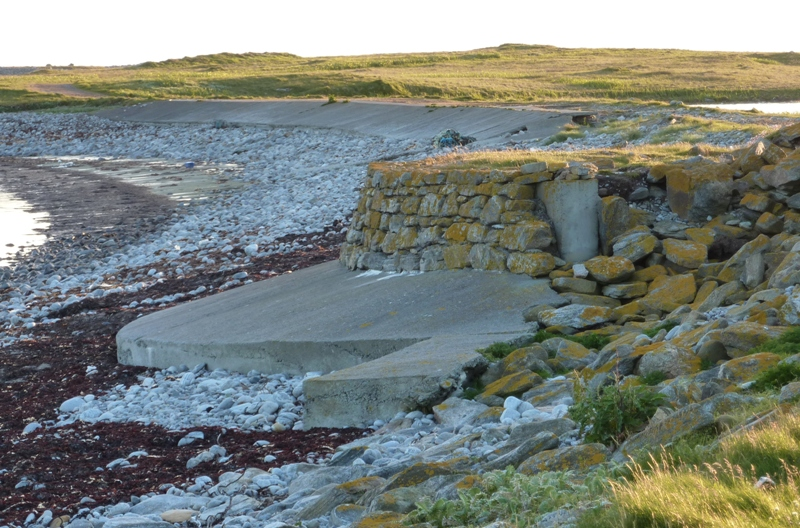
Dun Vulan broch site, showing concrete surrounds to protect it from coastal erosion

This was an age of forts and farmsteads, which tends to support the image of quarrelsome tribes and petty kingdoms recorded by the Romans. However, at times the occupants neglected the defences, which might suggest that symbolic power was as significant as warfare. Evidence from the Tyne-Forth area indicates that a dense pattern of unfortified farmsteads existed over a long span of time. Evidence of violence and conflict is "difficult to demonstrate conclusively" although on balance inter-community warfare is likely to have taken place. In the middle to late Iron Age some fortified settlements expanded significantly. The Votadini stronghold of Traprain Law, East Lothian for example was, at its maximum 40 hectares (99 acres) in extent, the size of a town, although there is no certain evidence either of a dense settlement or pre-Roman occupation. Neither have excavations at a similar site at Eildon Hill in Selgovae territory suggested significant occupation prior to the "Roman interludes".

There is no evidence from the Highlands of blunt force trauma to humans, although at Sculptor's Cave in Moray, there is 3rd century CE evidence of decapitation with a sword. Hillforts and enclosures around settlements suggest troubled times, but the evidence for actual violence is "limited and open to interpretation". The wealthiest Highland community excavated so far is Culduthel in Inverness and it was unenclosed. Likewise, a similar site at Birnie in Moray. The vitrification of hillforts has been interpreted as the deliberate action of victors in some conflict but accidental fires are a posisbility. The purpose of crannogs may have been apparently defensive but the sites would have been vulnerable to waterborne attacks.

Findings from the site of the broch at Dun Vulan in South Uist, which was occupied for c. 150 to 50 BCE, have generated some debate about the nature of life in the Atlantic coast during the Iron Age. A study of the site in the 1990s posited that the evidence of animal bones suggested a significant difference between those who lived in and around the broch and those in the surrounding area. They concluded that there was a settlement hierarchy similar to the distinction between Medieval English aristocrats and commoners. A second paper two years later refuted this. It does seem clear that in some parts of Iron Age Scotland, quite unlike almost all of recorded history right up to the present day, there does not seem to have been a hierarchical elite. Studies have shown that stone roundhouses with massively thick walls, must have contained virtually the entire population of islands such as Barra and North Uist and throughout Argyll. Iron Age settlement patterns in Scotland are not homogeneous, but, in these places, there is no sign of a privileged class living in large castles or forts, nor of an elite priestly caste or of peasants with no access to the kind of accommodation enjoyed by the middle classes. (Note: In Argyll, "in no case is it possible to demonstrate any kind of settlement hierarchy.")

== Settlement ==
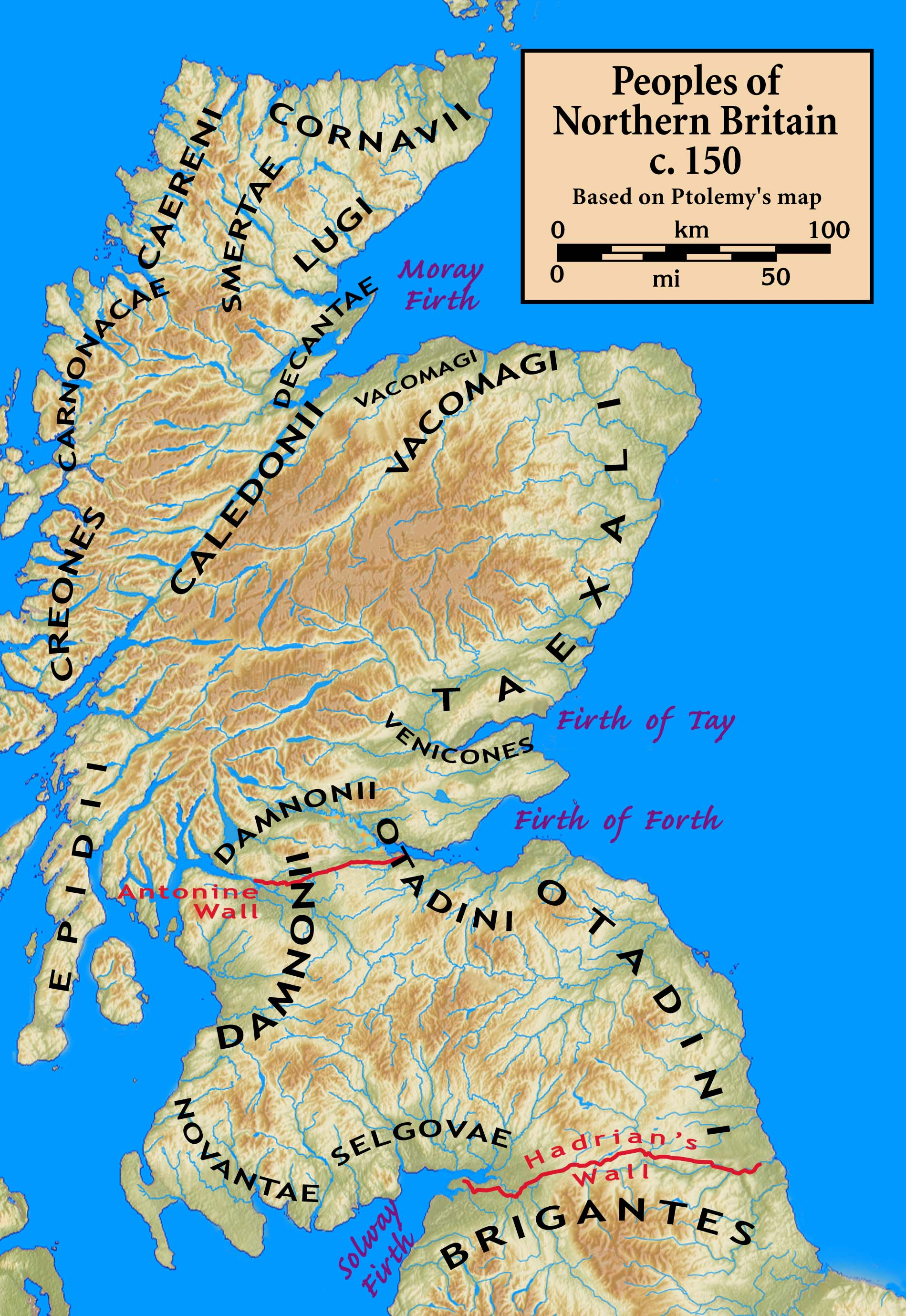

Brythonic (or "Pritennic") Celtic culture and language spread into southern Scotland at some time after the 8th century BC, possibly through cultural contact rather than mass invasion, and systems of petty kingdoms developed. However, the written records about Iron Age life in Scotland are principally from Roman sources and as a result tend to focus on the interludes of Roman occupation rather than a broader scope.

Ptolemy's Geographia lists tribes located north of the Forth-Clyde isthmus including the Cornovii in Caithness, the Caereni, Smertae, Carnonacae, Decantae, Lugi, and Creones also north of the Great Glen, the Taexali in the north-east, the Epidii in Argyll, the Venicones in Fife, the Caledonians in the central Highlands and the Vacomagi centred near Strathmore. It is likely that all of these cultures spoke a form of Celtic language known as Common Brittonic although there are no written records to corroborate this. (Note: The Pictish language is an extinct language spoken by the Picts from about 300 CE to the Early Middle Ages. Virtually no direct attestations of Pictish remain, short of a limited number of geographical and personal names found on monuments and early medieval records in the area controlled by them. Such evidence, however, shows the language to be an Insular Celtic language related to the Common Brittonic then spoken in most of the rest of Britain.) The occupants of southern Scotland were the Damnonii in the Clyde valley, the Novantae in Galloway, the Selgovae on the south coast and the Votadini to the east.

Little is known about the alliances of Iron Age tribes. The exact location of Caledonia is unknown, and the boundaries are unlikely to have been fixed. (Note: "A tribe of Caledones or Calidones [are] named by the geographer Ptolemy as living within boundaries which are now unascertainable".) The name itself is a Roman one, as used by Tacitus, Ptolemy, Pliny the Elder and Lucan, but the name by which the Caledonians referred to themselves is also unknown. It is likely that prior to the Roman invasions, political control in the region was highly decentralised and no evidence has emerged of any specific Caledonian military or political leadership. For example, Calgacus "is never referred to... as king or general" by Tacitus. Similarly, we know nothing of the foreign policies of the senior leaders in mainland Scotland in the first century.

The Geographia identifies 19 "towns" from intelligence gathered during the Agricolan campaigns of the first century. No archaeological evidence of any truly urban places has been found from this time and the names may have indicated hill forts or temporary market and meeting places. Most of the names are obscure: Devana may be the modern Banchory; Alauna ("the rock") in the west is probably Dumbarton Rock and the place of the same name in the east Lowlands may be the site of Edinburgh Castle. Lindon may be Balloch on Loch Lomond side.

The Ravenna Cosmography utilises a third- or fourth-century Roman map and identifies four loci (meeting places, possibly markets) in southern Scotland. Locus Maponi is possibly the Lochmaben Stone near modern Gretna which continued to be used as a muster point well into the historic period. Two of the others indicate meeting places of the Damnonii and Selgovae, and the fourth, Manavi may be Clackmannan. (Note: Manau is generally understood to refer to Manaw Gododdin in the vicinity of modern Clackmannan.)

== Architecture ==
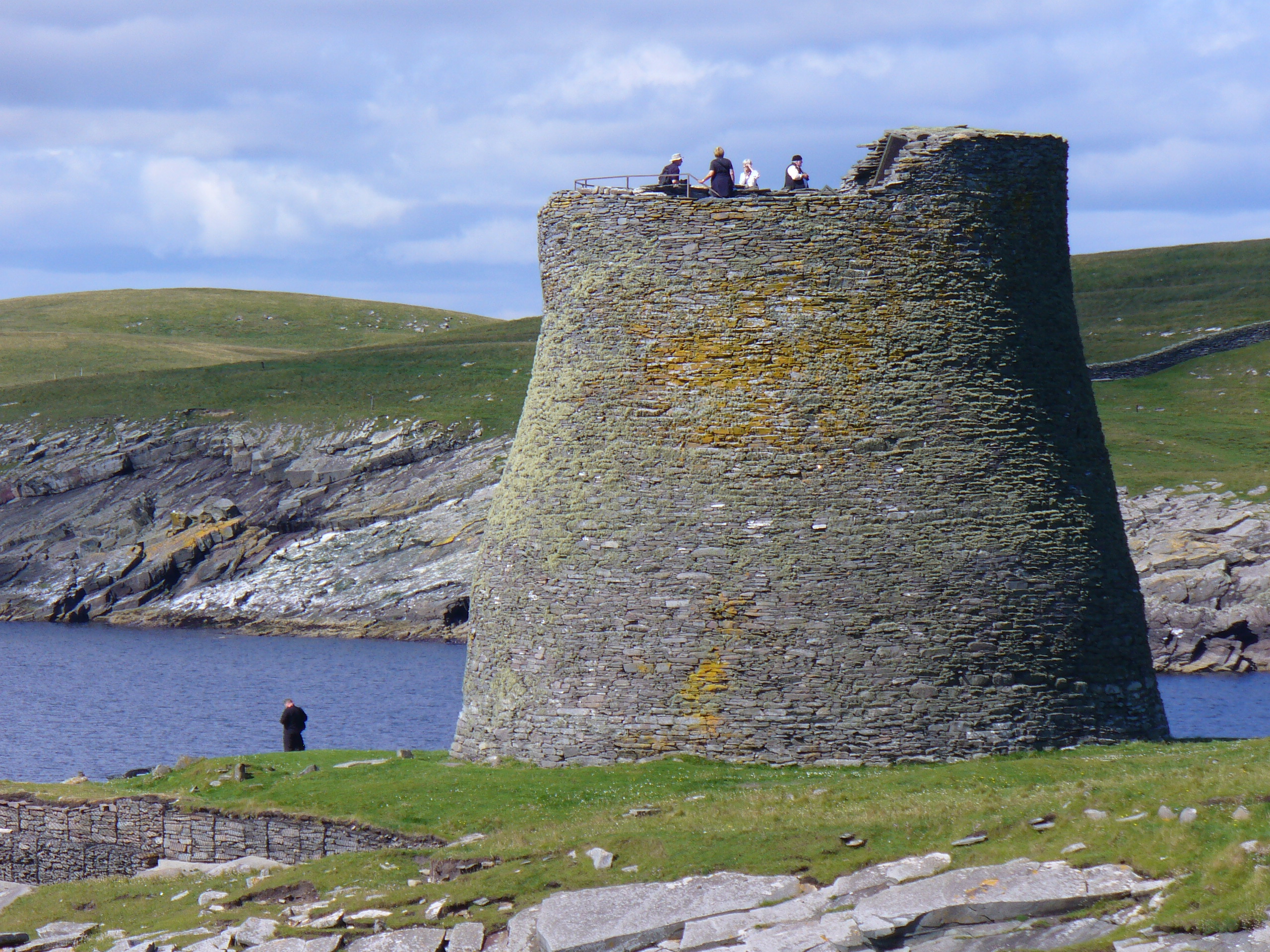
Broch of Mousa in Shetland dated to c. 300 BCE

=== The north and west ===
The peoples of early Iron Age Scotland, particularly in the north and west, lived in substantial stone buildings called Atlantic roundhouses. The remains of hundreds of these houses exist throughout the country, some merely piles of rubble, others with impressive towers and outbuildings. They date from about 800 BCE to CE 300, with the most imposing structures having been created around the second century BCE. The most massive constructions that date from this time are the circular brochs. On average, the ruins only survive up to a few metres above ground level, but there are five extant examples of towers whose walls still exceed 6.5 m (21 ft) in height. There are at least 100 broch sites in Scotland. (Note: Euan MacKie has proposed a total of 104 brochs. The Royal Commission on the Ancient and Historical Monuments of Scotland identifies 571 candidate sites.) Despite extensive research, their purpose and the nature of the societies that created them are still a matter of debate.

Quanterness chambered cairn in Orkney is a Neolithic structure constructed two millennia or more prior to the Iron Age. Excavations their uncovered a roundhouse built into the cairn dated to circa 700 BCE.

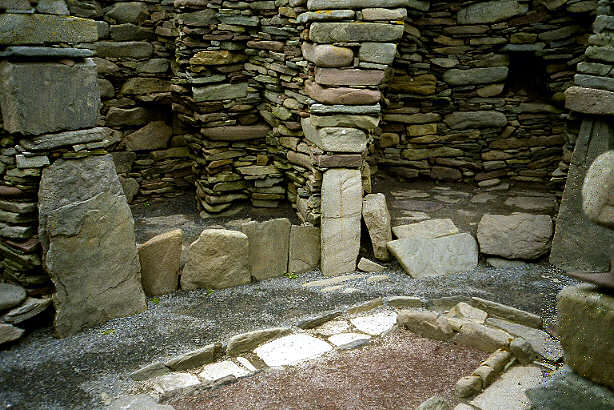
The interior of a Jarlshof wheelhouse showing bays between the stone piers

Wheelhouses have an outer stone wall within which a circle of stone piers (bearing a resemblance to the spokes of a wheel) form the basis for lintel arches supporting corbelled roofing with a hearth at the hub. About a third are double-walled. They range in diameter from 4 to 11.5 metres (13 to 38 feet). Those sites that have been dated tend to fall within the period 25 BC to 380 AD. In the Northern Isles they are of a later date than the towered structures in all cases. The majority are dug into the landscape and only their thatched roofs would have been visible above the ground — although these would have been 6 metres or more in height. A total of 62 sites have now been identified in the Northern and Western Isles, and on the north coast of Caithness and Sutherland. The highly restricted nature of their geographical locations suggests that they may have been contained within a political or cultural frontier of some kind. The co-incidence of their arrival and departure being associated with the period of Roman influence in Scotland is a matter of ongoing debate. It is not known whether the culture that constructed them was "Pictish" as such although they would certainly have been known to the Picts.

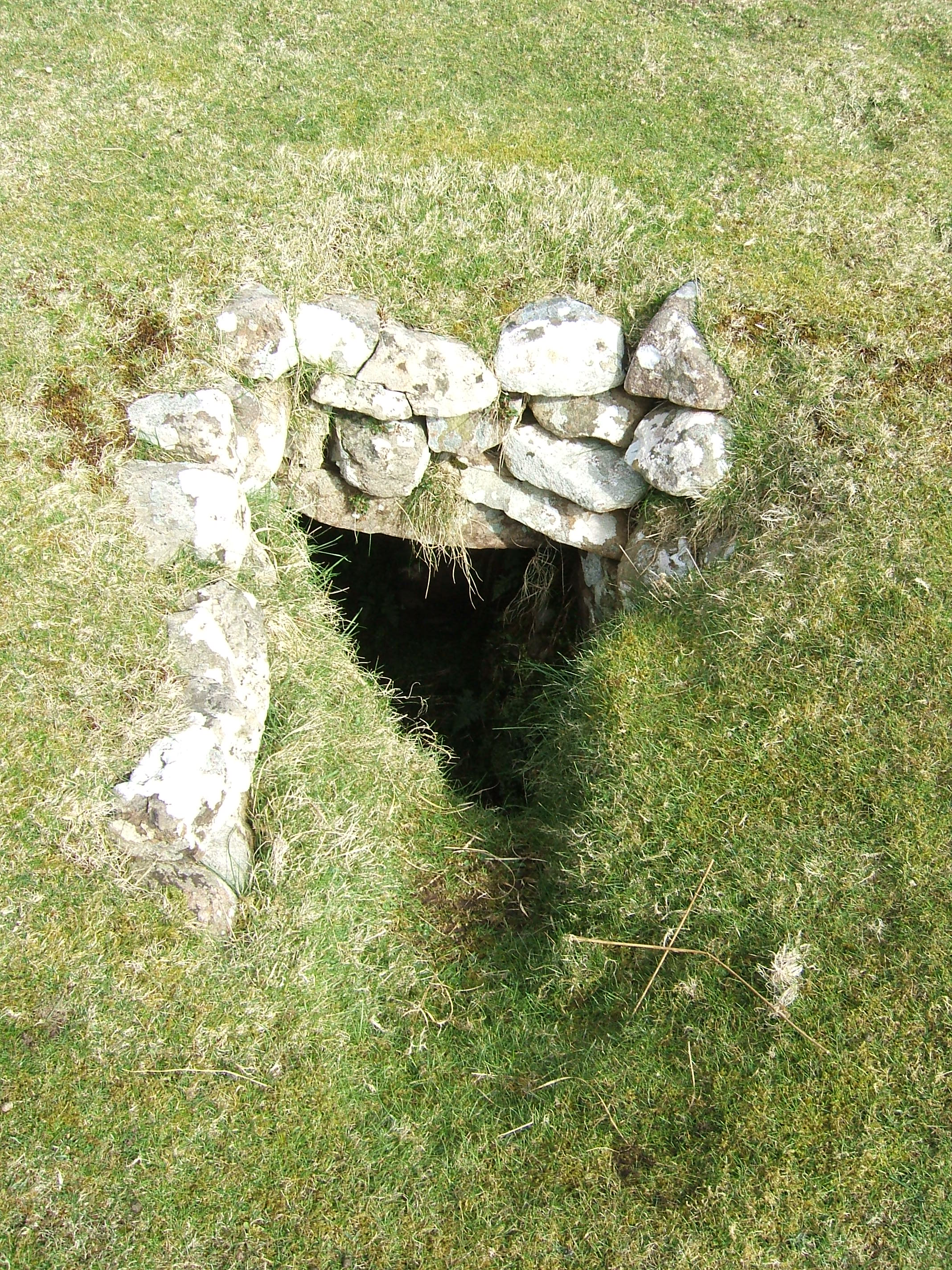
Souterrain on Canna in the Hebrides

Over 400 souterrains have been discovered in Scotland, many of them in the south-east, and, although few have been dated, those that have suggest a construction date in the second or third centuries. The purpose of these small underground structures is also obscure. They are usually found close to settlements (whose timber frames are much less well-preserved) and may have been for storing perishable agricultural products.

Scotland also has numerous vitrified forts but an accurate chronology has again proven to be evasive. Extensive studies of such a fort at Finavon Hill near Forfar in Angus, using a variety of techniques, suggest dates for the destruction of the site in either the last two centuries BCE or the mid-first millennium. The lack of Roman artefacts (common in sites close to souterrains) suggests that many sites were abandoned before the arrival of the legions.

The site at Jarlshof in Shetland is part of a tentative list of proposed World Heritage Sites called the "Zenith of Iron Age Shetland".

=== Lowland Scotland ===
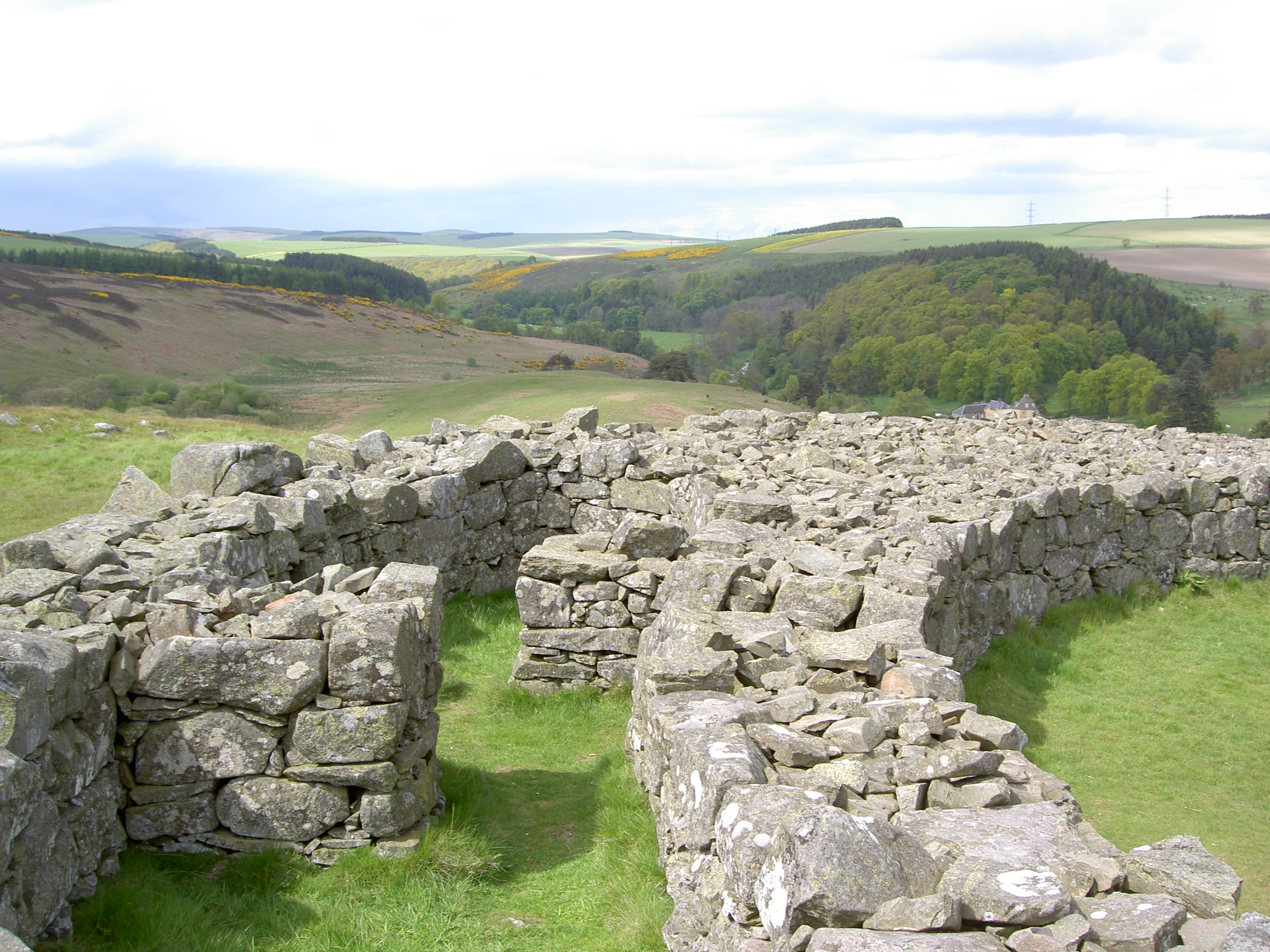
Edin's Hall Broch near Duns in the Scottish Borders, showing intramural chambers

Writing in 2002 Ballin Smith and Banks noted the "paucity of papers on the Iron Age of mainland Scotland", the research concentrating on the islands to the west and north where scattered modern rural populations and limited agriculture meant that Iron Age buildings were relatively easy to find and excavate (and in many cases are vulnerable to coastal erosion). As a result, analysis of societal structures on the mainland south of the Highland Line are limited in scope.

There are the remains of fifteen broch towers in southern Scotland that appear to date from the period immediately prior to or following Agricola's invasion. They are found in four locations: the Forth valley, close to the Firth of Tay, the far south-west and the eastern Borders. Their existence so far from the main centres of broch-building is something of a mystery. The Leckie Broch may have been destroyed by the Roman invaders, yet, like the nearby site of Fairy Knowe at Buchlyvie, a substantial amount of both Roman and native artefacts has been recovered there. Both structures were built in the late first century and were evidently high-status buildings. The inhabitants raised sheep, cattle and pigs, and benefited from a range of wild game, including red deer and wild boar. The destruction of some of the southern brochs may date to the Antonine advance, the hypothesis being that whether or not they had previously been symbols of Roman patronage they had now outlived their usefulness from a Roman point of view.

Edin's Hall Broch in Berwickshire is the best-preserved southern broch and, although the ruins are superficially similar to some of the larger Orcadian broch villages, it is unlikely that the tower was ever more than a single-storey high. There is an absence of Roman artefacts at this site. Various theories for the existence of these structures have been proposed, including their construction by northern invaders following the withdrawal of Roman troops after the Agricolan advance, or by allies of Rome encouraged to emulate the impressive northern style in order to suppress native resistance. It is also possible that their construction had little to do with Roman frontier policy and was simply the importation of a new style by southern elites, or it may have been a response by such elites to the growing threat of Rome prior to the invasion and an attempt to ally themselves, actually or symbolically, with the north that was largely free of Roman hegemony.

== Agriculture ==
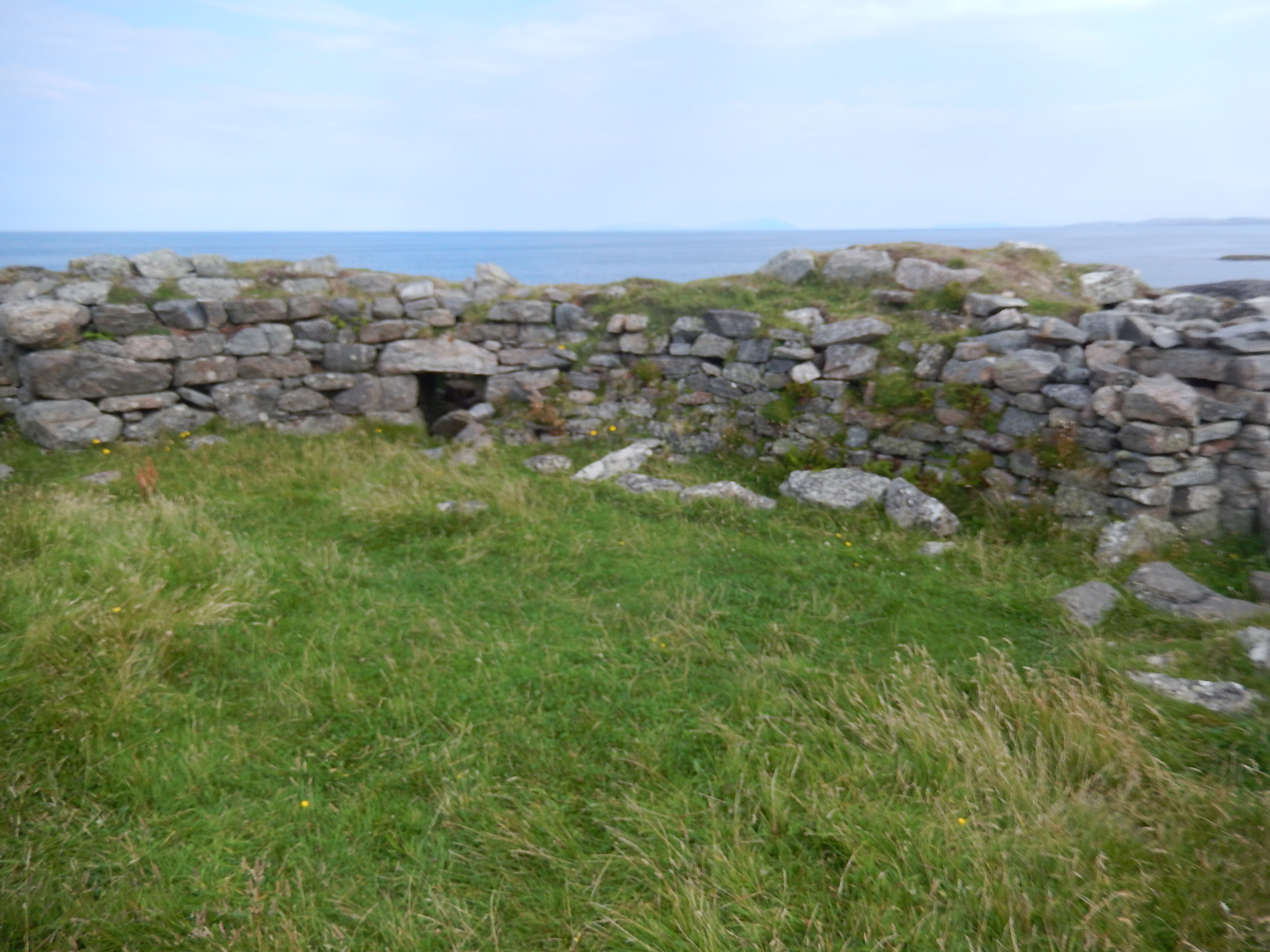
Dun Mor Vaul broch, Tiree

There is widespread evidence of hunting, fishing, fowling and the gathering of foods such as hazelnuts throughout the period. Writing in the late 1950s C. M Piggott wrote that during the late Iron Age northern Britain was populated by "celtic cowboys and shepherds, footloose and unpredictable, moving with their animals over rough pasture and moorland [who] could never adopt the Roman way of life in the manner of the settled farmers of the South". Although sheep and cattle were important to the economy throughout this period, subsequent excavations in the Northern Isles and Hebrides challenged Piggot's supposition. There is evidence from Orkney and elsewhere of cattle being used for milk production in the vicinity of broch settlements and pigs were evidently being kept at numerous sites. These include Old Scatness broch where a hearthstone with an incised drawing of a boar was found in 1998. Deer are the only animals found on decorated pottery in the Hebrides and deer bones made up a high proportion of finds at the site at Dun Mor Vaul on Tiree. This is not an island that could have supported large herds of deer and suggests that exploitation of local resources did not always follow an obvious pattern.

Several sites show evidence of large scale drying and storing of grains such as barley and oats and it is possible the significant increase in domestic cat remains found at these sites was due to their deliberate introduction to protect bulk storage from rodents. Flax growing also appears in the record during the late Iron Age. The relative importance of cereal growing to pastoralism is hard to gauge but the picture appears to be one of increasing intensification of agriculture as the Iron Age progressed and particularly in the post-broch period. The existence of "cord-rig" field systems in upland areas also suggests extensive arable farming in lower-lying well drained areas although there is very little evidence for field boundaries anywhere in Scotland.

== Religion ==
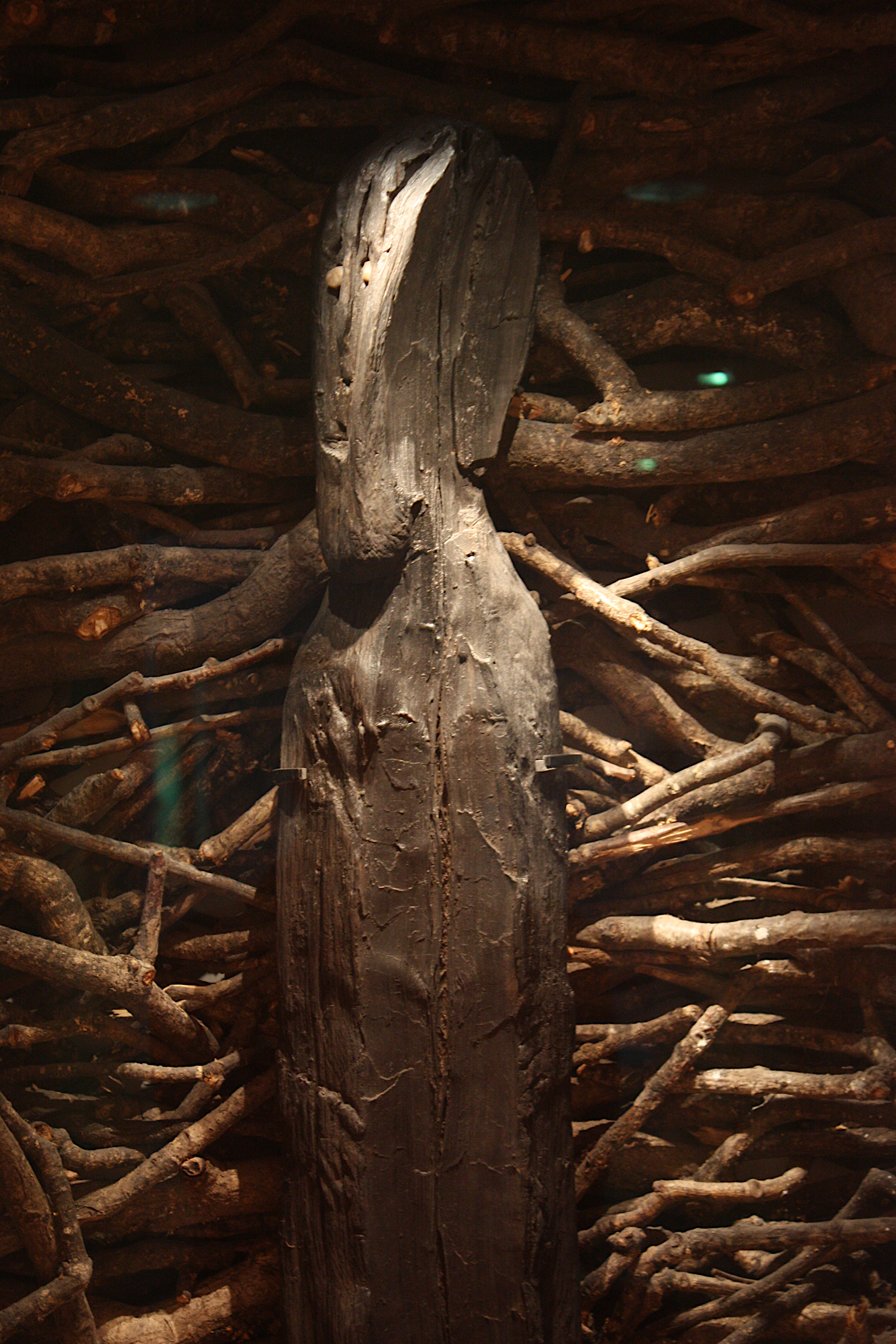
The Ballachulish figure, discovered in 1880 and dated to c. 540 BCE

Unlike the earlier Neolithic and Bronze Ages, which have provided massive monuments to the dead, Iron Age burial sites in Scotland are rare prior to the Roman and post-Roman eras. The reasons for these changes are not at all clear.

Several sites in Argyll indicate cave burials took place throughout the period. Excavations at Keil cave on the Mull of Kintyre found indications of burials, iron working and Roman pottery with activity taking place over an extended period. A 2008 find of a grave with weaponry at Dunbar also provides some insight into the culture of this period. A similar site at Alloa, adjacent to a Bronze Age burial, has been provisionally dated to between 200 BCE to 200 CE. The Ballachulish figure is a life-sized female figure in alder with quartz pebbles for eyes found under a wicker structure beneath peat at Ballachulish. The high standard of preservation suggests it was deliberately submerged and may indicate the "decommissioning of some form of shrine".

Roman influence assisted the spread of Christianity throughout Europe, but there is little evidence of a direct link between the Roman Empire and Christian missions north of Hadrian's Wall. Traditionally, Ninian is credited as the first bishop active in Scotland. He is briefly mentioned by Bede who states that in the fifth century he set up his base at Whithorn in the south-west of Scotland building a stone church there known as Candida Casa.

In the mid sixth century Columba founded the monastery at Iona in the Gaelic kingdom of Dál Riata and composed his "Rule of Monks" and "Rules of Communal Life". The influence of Iona was considerable, with strong links to Ireland and a network of monastic sites in the west of Scotland including Applecross, Tiree, Lismore, Eigg and Hinba. Columba's role has been interpreted as that of a "strategist, providing an important link between secular and ecclesiastical power bases."

Less well-known is the Pictish monastery at Portmahomack on the east coast founded at the end of the seventh or beginning of the eighth century. It may have existed within a larger ritual landscape as indicated by the monumental Pictish cross-slabs at Nigg, Cadboll and the Clach a' Charridh at Shandwick. It was preceded by an "elite farmstead" which may have included a craft-working centre but was destroyed during the early Viking period.

These later attacks by Norse raiders on Christian settlements were not without precedent. In the 6th century Tiree was raided by Pictish forces, Tory Island off the coast of Donegal was attacked in the early 7th century by a "marine fleet" and Donnán of Eigg and 52 companions were murdered by Picts on Eigg in 617. Ó Corráin writes of an incident of Viking activity in Ireland that "This was a perfectly normal military campaign in Irish circumstances and the plundering of churches was an integral part of warfare and not a new vice learned with alacrity from the Vikings."

== Art and technology ==
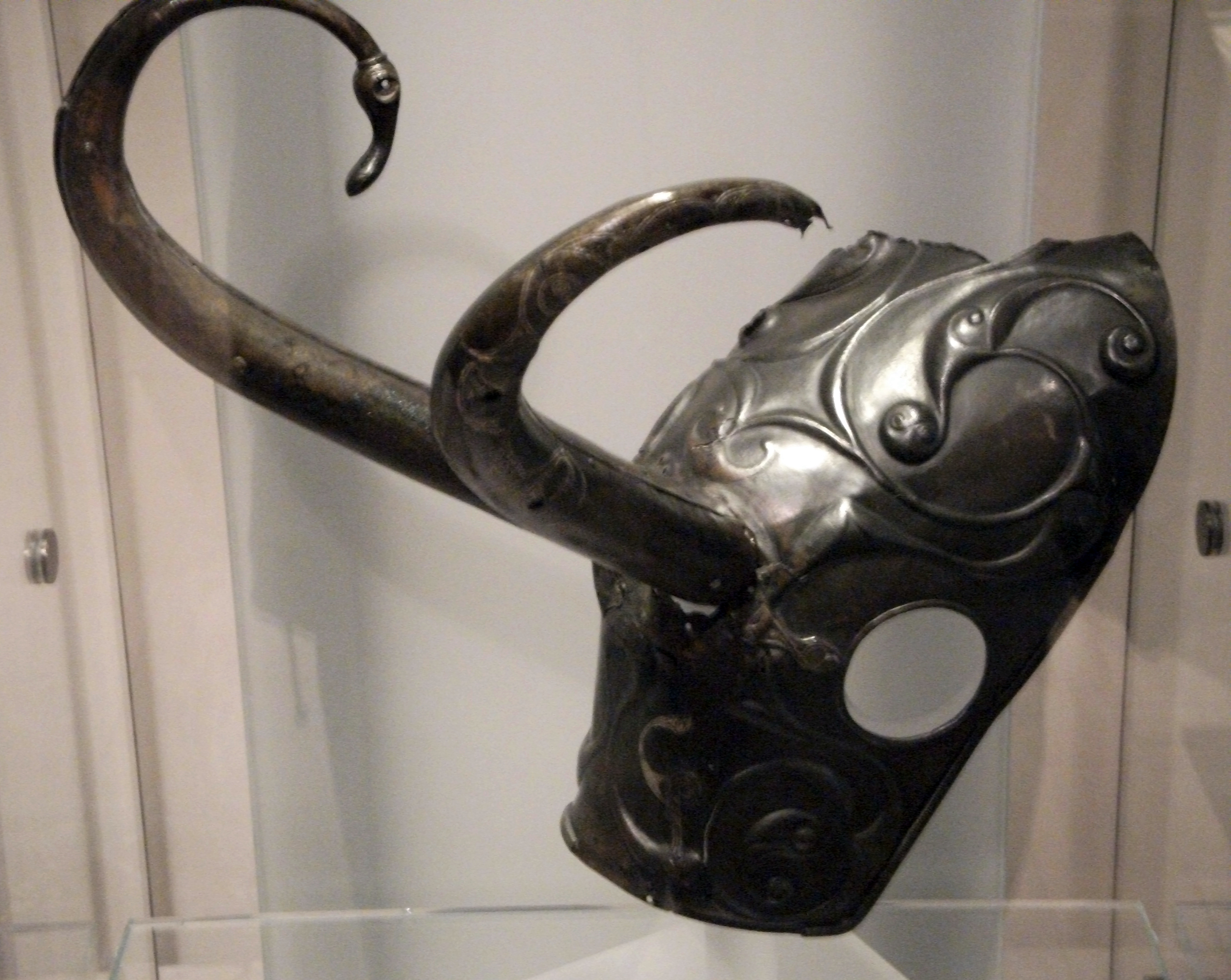
Torrs Pony-cap and Horns

The Torrs Pony-cap and Horns, dating from c. 200 BCE and in the La Tène style, are amongst a relatively small surviving group of elite metal objects from the Scottish Iron Age. Found near Castle Douglas, the motifs bear some similarity to scabbards found in County Antrim across the Irish Sea and those of the Arras culture centred in northern England.

The Stirling torcs make up a hoard of four gold torcs that date to between 300 and 100 BCE and which were buried deliberately at some point in antiquity. They were found by a metal detectorist in a field near Blair Drummond in 2009.

The ceremonial Deskford Carnyx was found near Deskford in 1816. Constructed almost entirely of brass, only the boar's head survives. Based in part on the metallurgy, the Museum of Scotland give a date of 80-250 CE for its construction, noting that it was a locally produced piece, "a specifically Scottish variant" distinct in design from known continental carnyces.

The Pictish symbol stones are an enigma of Iron Age art. There are regularly occurring symbols such as the double disc and images of animals such as the Burghead Bulls and the Pictish Beast on these monumental stones but their original purpose is not clear. The remains of the bridge of a lyre found at High Pasture Cave on Skye is the earliest find of a stringed instrument in western Europe.

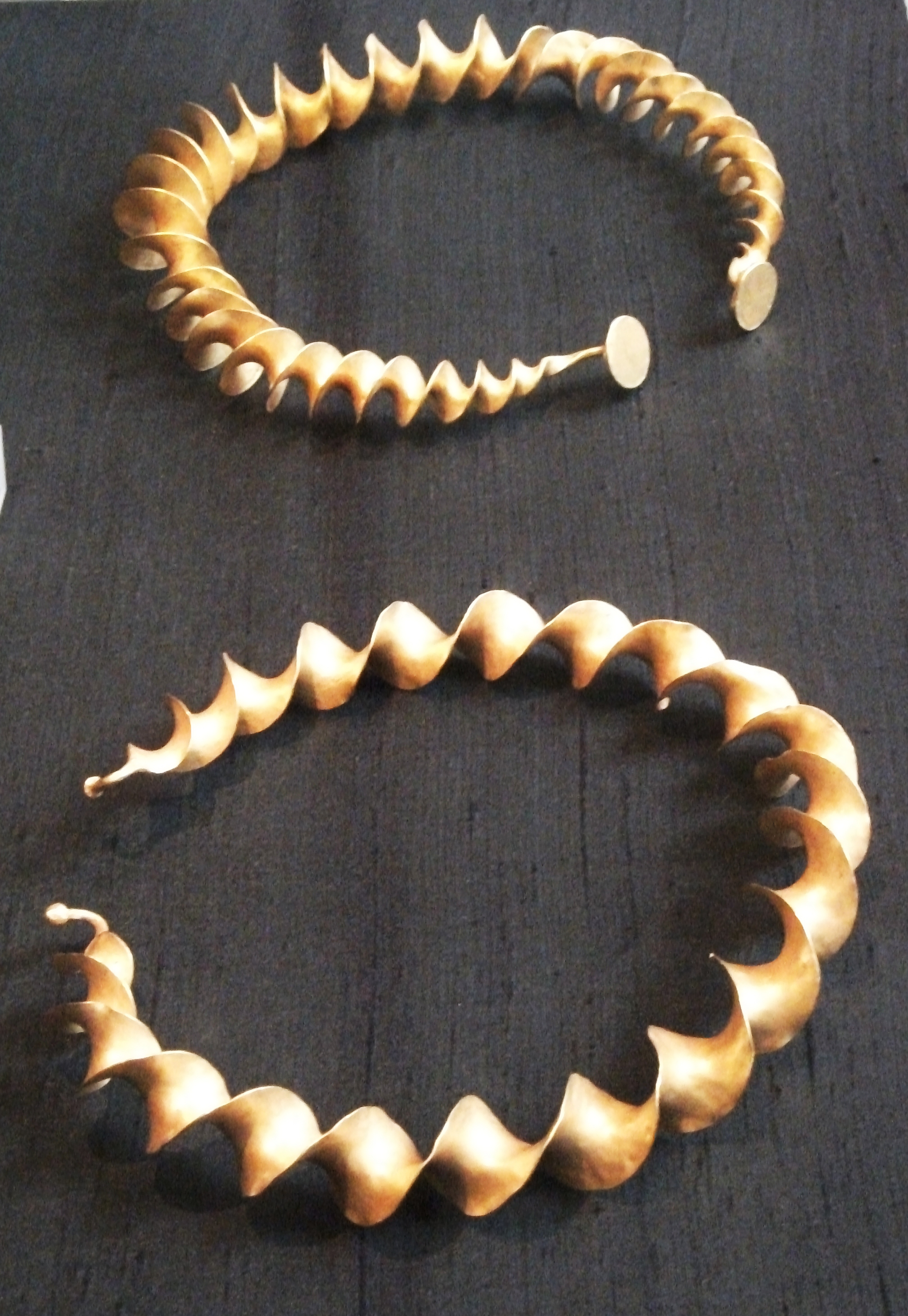
Two of the Stirling torcs

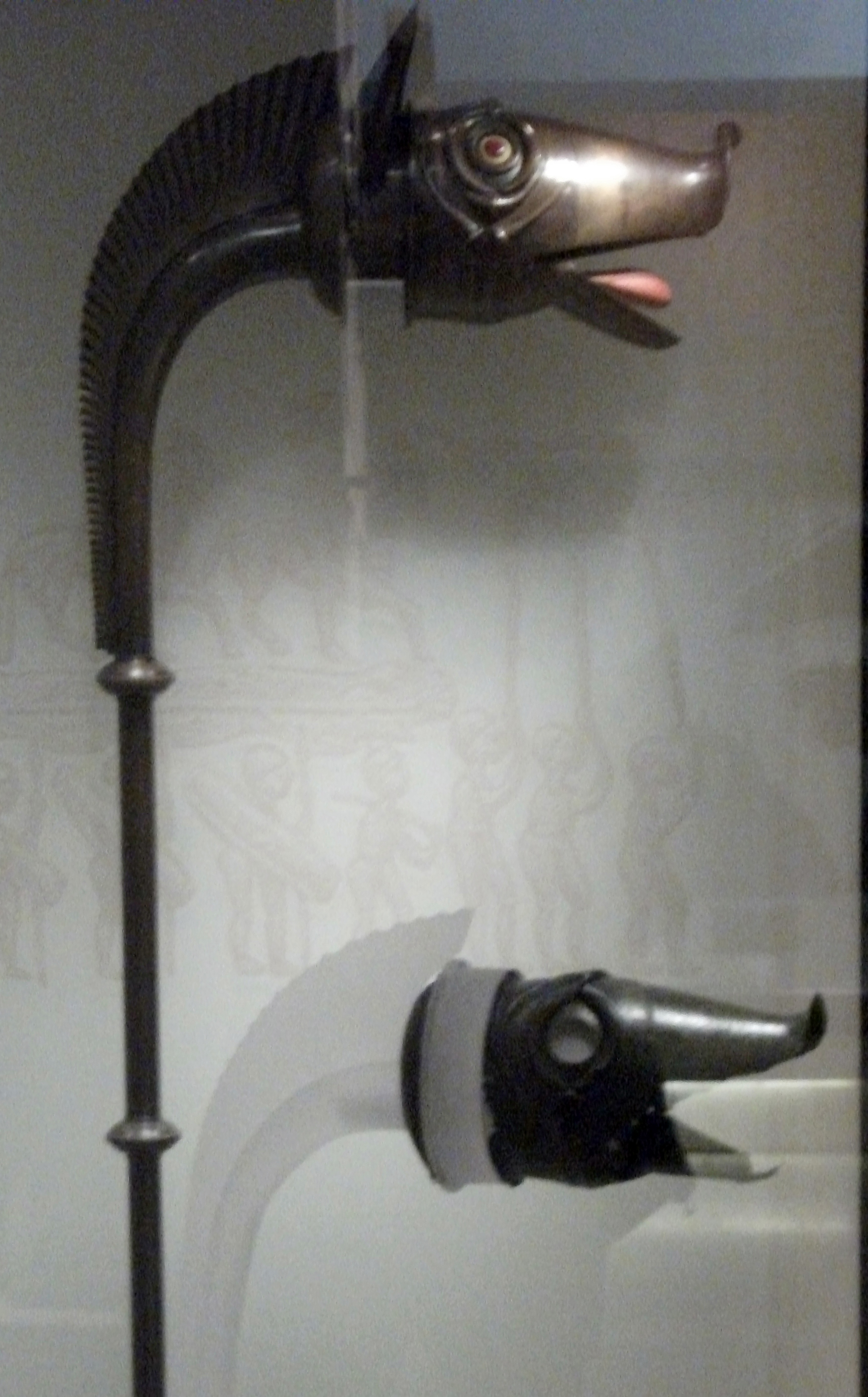
Deskford carnyx & reconstruction

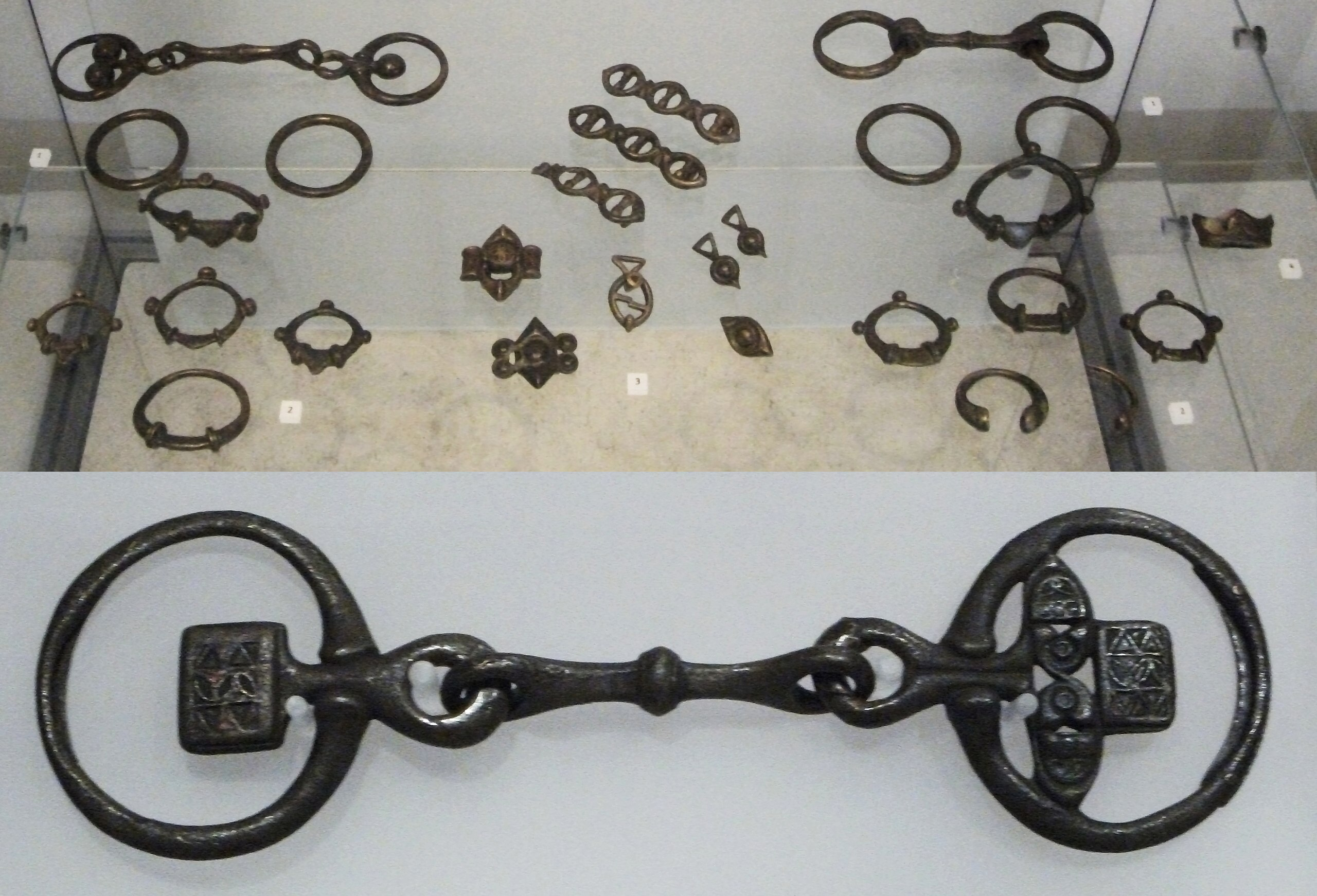
Horse harness, Middlebie Hoard, 1st-2nd century CE

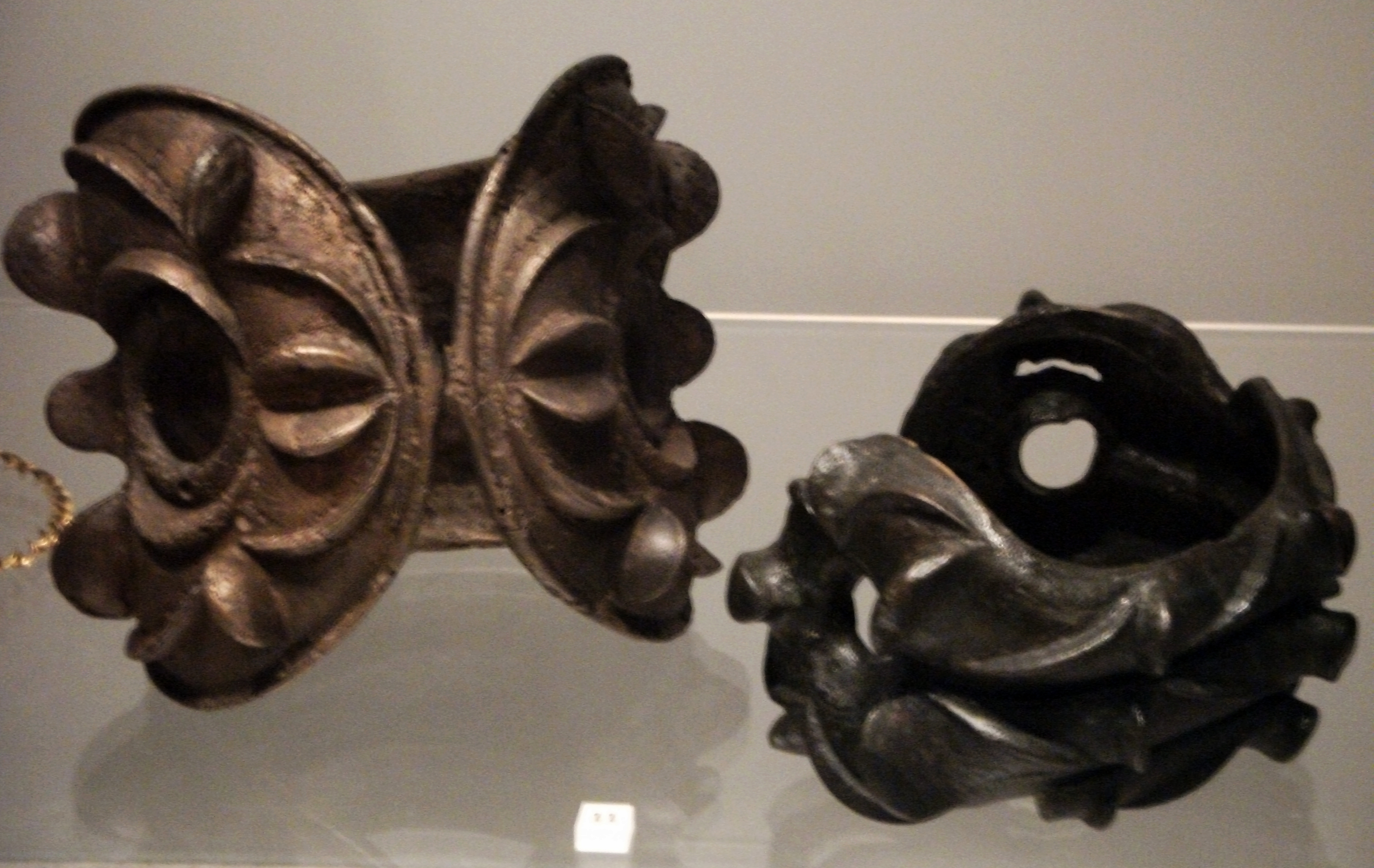
Bronze bracelets dated to c. 100 CE found near Banff

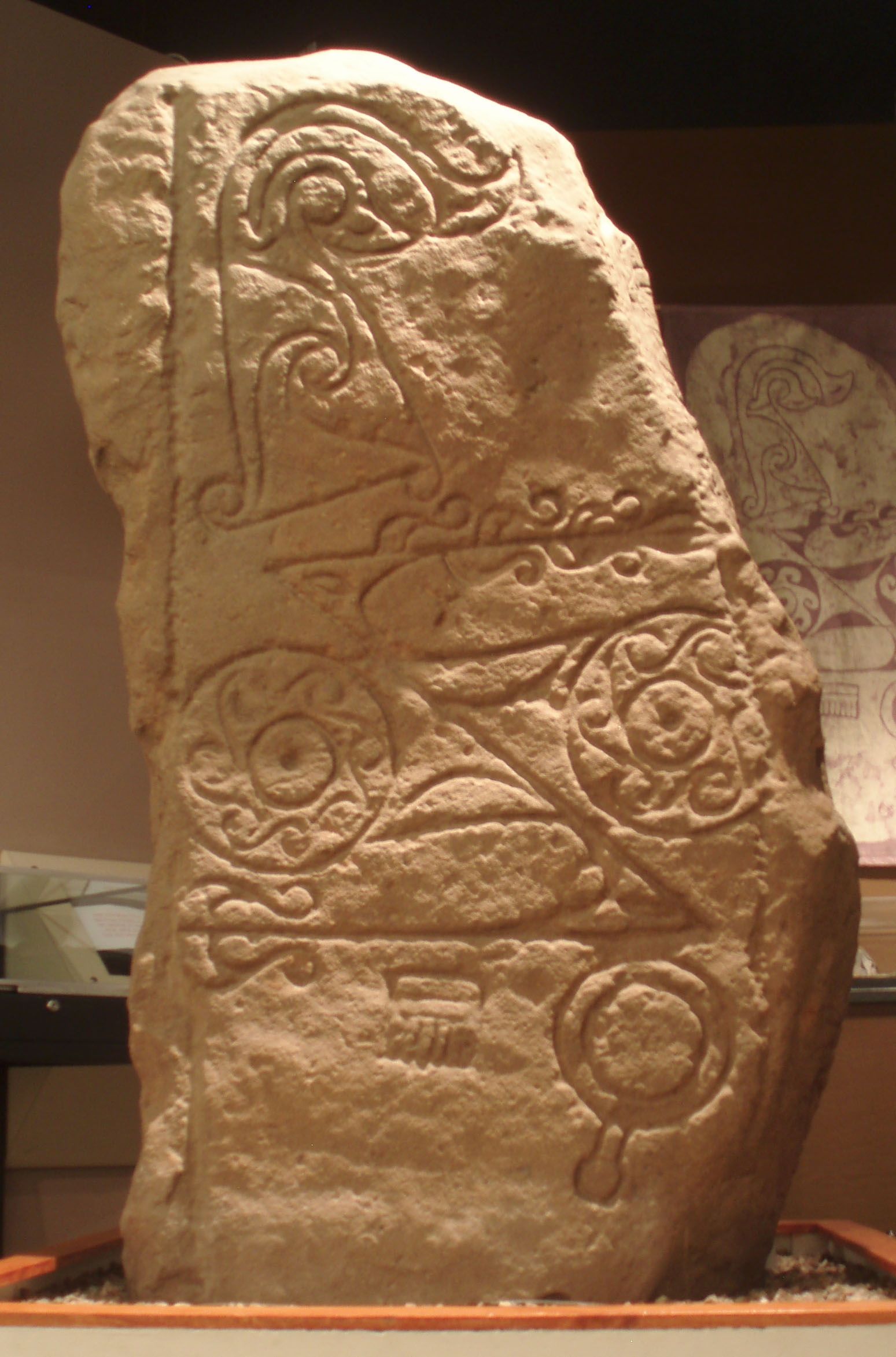
The Dunnichen Stone with a double disc and Z-rod at centre

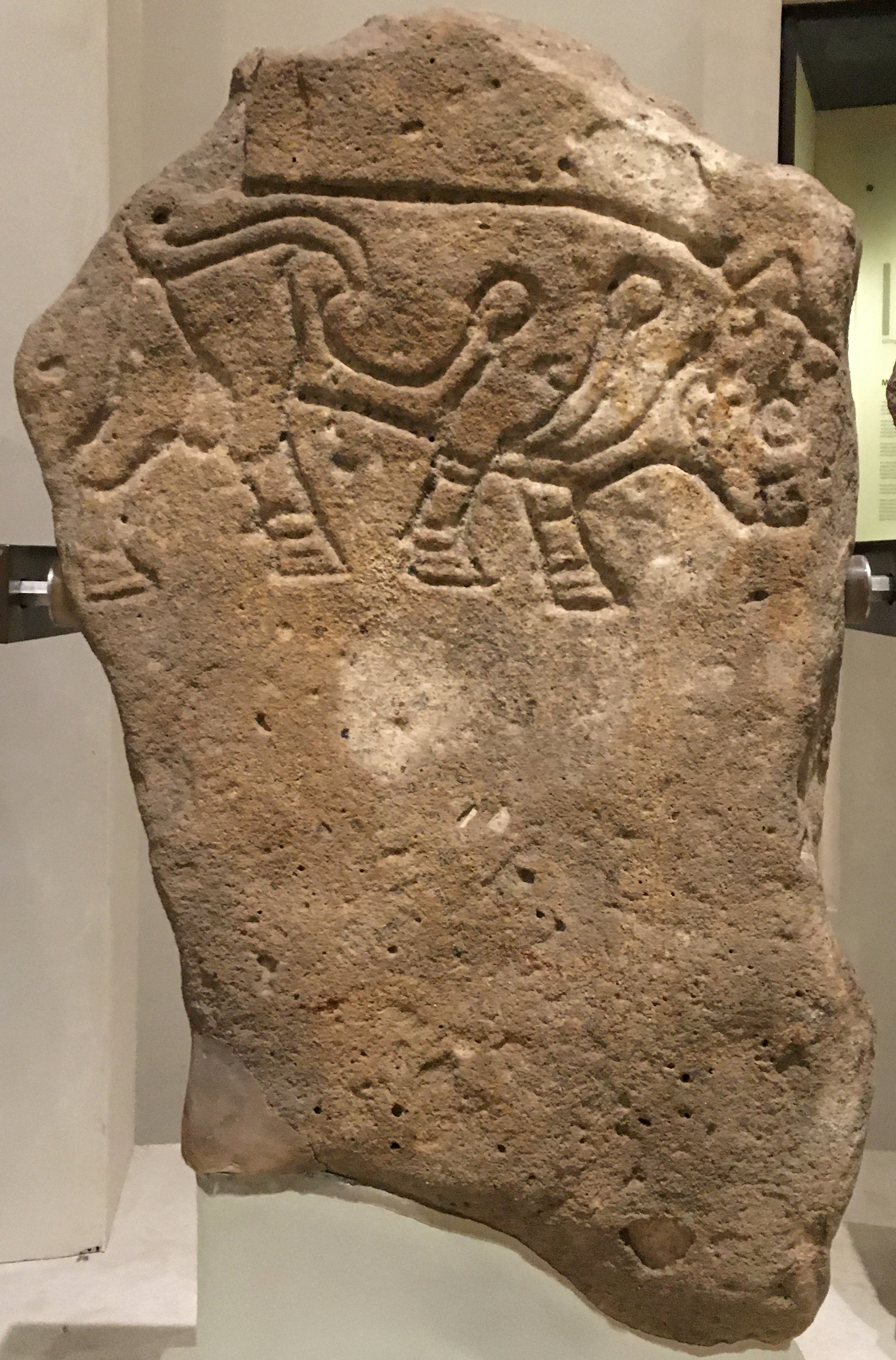
One of the Burghead Bulls

Just as for artistic works, the influences of other parts of northwest Europe can be seen in the development of technology. For example rotary querns were introduced to Scotland at much the same time as they are found elsewhere. On the other hand, no evidence for the use of pottery wheels or the production of coins has been found prior to the arrival of the Romans. Some finds of coins are eclectic and have included those minted in Greece or Roman Egypt. A hoard at Belladrum contained silver coins, which are a feature of similar finds on the south coast of the Moray Firth.

Bog iron is widespread in upland Scotland and formed a key resource for early metal working. Evidence from Poolewe indicates that the use of non-ferrous metals began at the commencement of the Iron Age even in the places far from the availabality of raw materials.

== Roman interludes (CE 71-211) ==
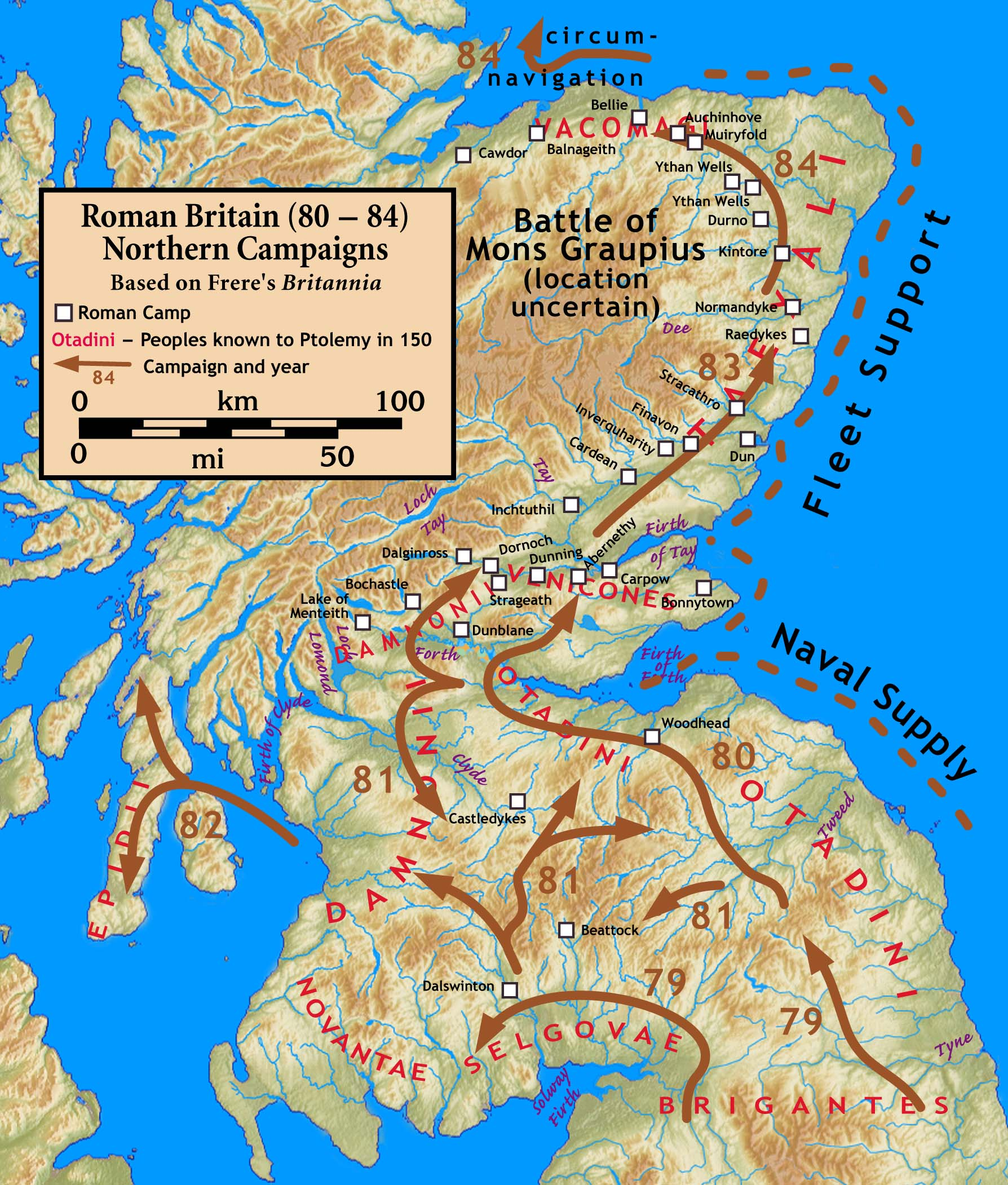
Roman campaigns in Scotland in the early 80s

Circa CE 71 the Roman governor Cerialis launched an invasion. The Votadini, who occupied the south-east of Scotland, came under Roman sway at an early stage and Cerialis sent one division north through their territory to the shores of the Firth of Forth. A second legion took a western route through Annandale in an attempt to encircle and isolate the Selgovae who occupied the central Southern Uplands.

In CE 78 Agricola arrived in Britain to take up his appointment as the new governor. He moved his troops north and began constructing a line of Glenblocker forts to the north and west of the Gask Ridge which marked a frontier between the Venicones to the south and the Caledonians to the north. (Note: There is some evidence that these forts may have been constructed during the term of his predecessor Cerialis.) In the summer of CE 84 his legions faced the combined forces of the Caledonians at the Battle of Mons Graupius, the site of which is unknown. According to Tacitus, Agricola brought between 17,000 and 30,000 troops and faced a foe with a similar complement.

After winning the battle decisively Agricola ordered the prefect of this fleet to sail around the north of Scotland to confirm that Britain was an island. It was proclaimed that Agricola had finally subdued all the tribes of Britain. Marching camps may have been constructed along the southern shores of the Moray Firth, although their existence is questioned. (Note: "None of the postulated sites discovered by aerial survey in Moray and Nairn over recent years has the distinctive morphological characteristics of a Roman fort".) Presumably as a consequence of the Roman advance, various hill forts such as Dun Mor in Perthshire, which had been abandoned by the natives long before, were re-occupied. Some new ones may even have been constructed in the northeast, such as Hill O'Christ's Kirk in Aberdeenshire.

Soon after his announcement of victory, Agricola was recalled to Rome by Domitian and his post passed to an unknown successor. The fortress Agricola had caused to be built fortress at Inchtuthil was dismantled before its completion and the other fortifications on the Gask Ridge were abandoned within the space of a few years. By CE 87 the occupation was limited to the Southern Uplands and by the end of the first century the northern limit of Roman expansion was the Stanegate road between the River Tyne and the Solway Firth.

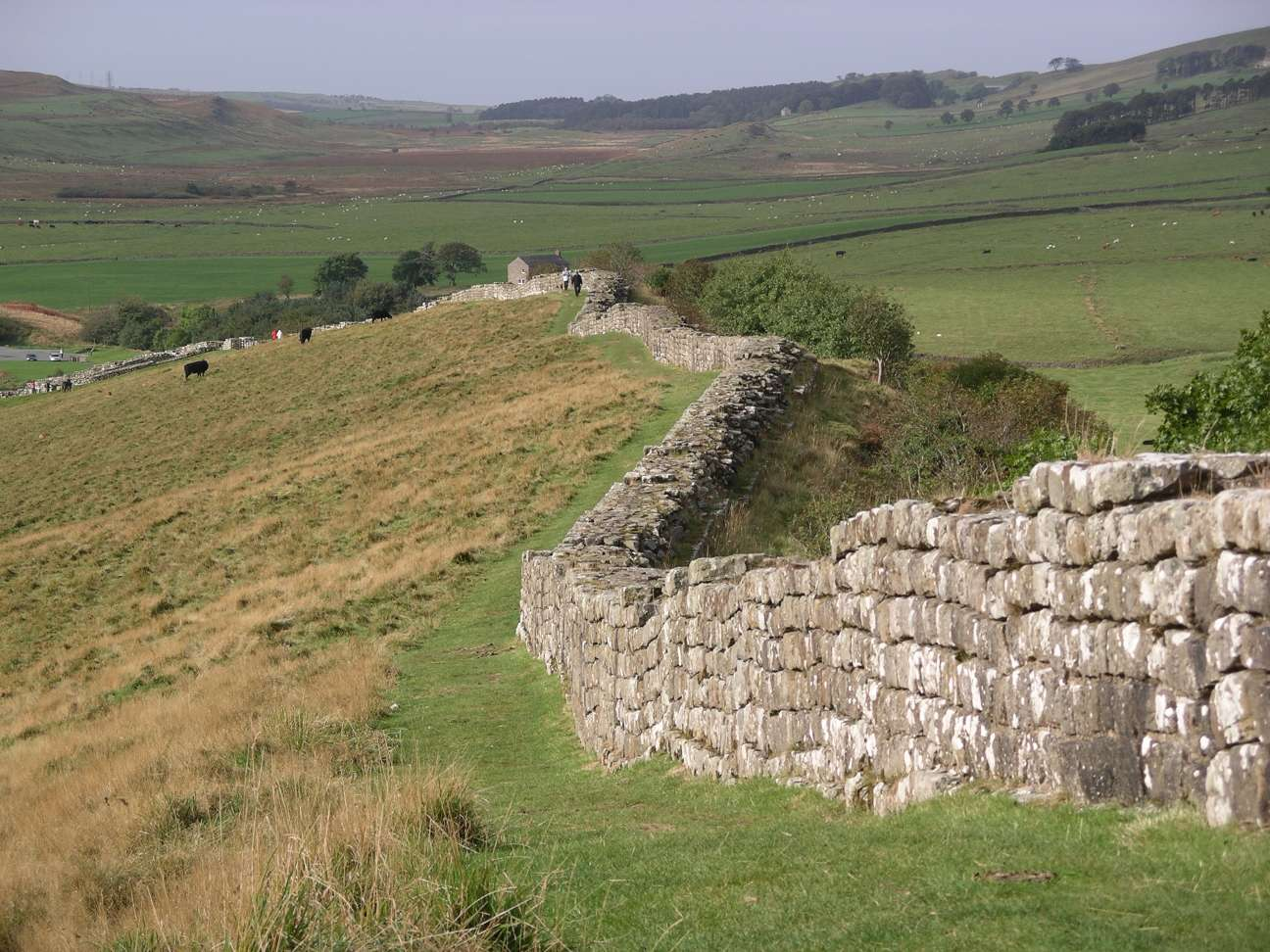
A section of Hadrian's Wall near Greenhead, Northumberland

The construction of 118 kilometres (73 mi) long Hadrian's Wall in the early 120s on the orders of the Emperor Hadrian consolidated the Roman line of defence on the Tyne-Solway line, where it remained until c.139 CE. It was a stone and turf fortification built across the width of what is now northern England and was roughly 4 metres (13 ft) or more high along its length, and the wall was wide enough to allow for a walkway along the top.

=== Antonine Wall and Severan campaigns ===
Quintus Lollius Urbicus was made governor of Roman Britain in 138, by the new emperor Antoninus Pius who soon reversed the containment policy of his predecessor Hadrian, and Urbicus was ordered to begin the reconquest of Lowland Scotland by moving north. His total force may have been about 16,500 men and commemorative coins were issued celebrating a victory in Britain.

Construction of a new limes between the Firth of Forth and the Firth of Clyde commenced. Today, the sward-covered Antonine Wall is the remains of a defensive line made of turf and clay circa 7 metres (23 feet) high (including a wooden palisade), with seventeen forts. It was constructed after 139 CE and extended for 60 km (37 mi).

Then Urbicus turned his attention upon the Novantae who inhabited the Dumfries and Galloway peninsula. The main lowland tribes, sandwiched as they were between Hadrian's Wall of stone to the south and the new turf wall to the north, later formed a confederation against Roman rule, collectively known as the Maeatae. Urbicus achieved an impressive series of military successes, but like Agricola's they were short-lived. Having taken twelve years to build, the Antonine Wall was overrun and abandoned soon after 160 CE.

The Roman frontier became Hadrian's Wall again, and subsequently the most notable invasion was in 209 when the emperor Septimius Severus, claiming to be provoked by the belligerence of the Maeatae, campaigned against the Caledonian Confederacy. Severus invaded Caledonia with an army perhaps over 40,000 strong. By 210, Severus' campaigning had made significant gains, but his campaign was cut short when he fell ill, dying at Eboracum in 211. The Romans never campaigned deep into Caledonia again and they soon withdrew south permanently to Hadrian's Wall.

=== Roman influence ===
The military presence of Rome lasted for little more than 40 years for most of Scotland and only as much as 80 years in total anywhere. It's now generally considered that at no time was even half of Scotland's land mass under Roman control. (Note: Hanson concluded that: "For many years it has been almost axiomatic in studies of the period that the Roman conquest must have had some major medium or long-term impact on Scotland. On present evidence that cannot be substantiated either in terms of environment, economy, or, indeed, society. The impact appears to have been very limited. The general picture remains one of broad continuity, not of disruption.... The Roman presence in Scotland was little more than a series of brief interludes within a longer continuum of indigenous development." Fraser demurs, stating that "In northern Britain, as in the rest of barbaricum, developments in the shape of society, in material culture, in senses of identity and in religious allegiances were all affected by political and cultural interactions with Rome and Roman provincials." Nonetheless, Harding objects to "the tacit assumption that in some way documentary sources are more reliable than archaeological evidence". See Harding, Hanson, and Ralston & Armit for a review of some of the archaeological evidence.)

Although little more than a series of relatively brief interludes of military occupation, Imperial Rome was ruthless and brutal in pursuit of its ends. Extensive analyses of Black Loch in Fife suggest that arable land spread at the expense of forest from about 2000 BCE until the first-century Roman advance. Thereafter, there was re-growth of birch, oak and hazel for a period of five centuries, suggesting the invasions had a very negative impact on the native population in that area. The situation outside the Roman-held areas is harder to assess, but the long-term influence of Rome may not have been substantial. Overall, it is hard to detect any direct connections between native architecture and settlement patterns and Roman influence. Elsewhere in Europe, new kingdoms and languages emerged from the remnants of the once-mighty Roman world. In Scotland, the Roman presence may have destabilised some of the pre-existing power structures, and perhaps "helped to catalyse the transformation from tribal organizations to Kingdoms" but the Celtic Iron Age way of life, often troubled but never extinguished by Rome, simply re-asserted itself.

== Late Iron Age ==
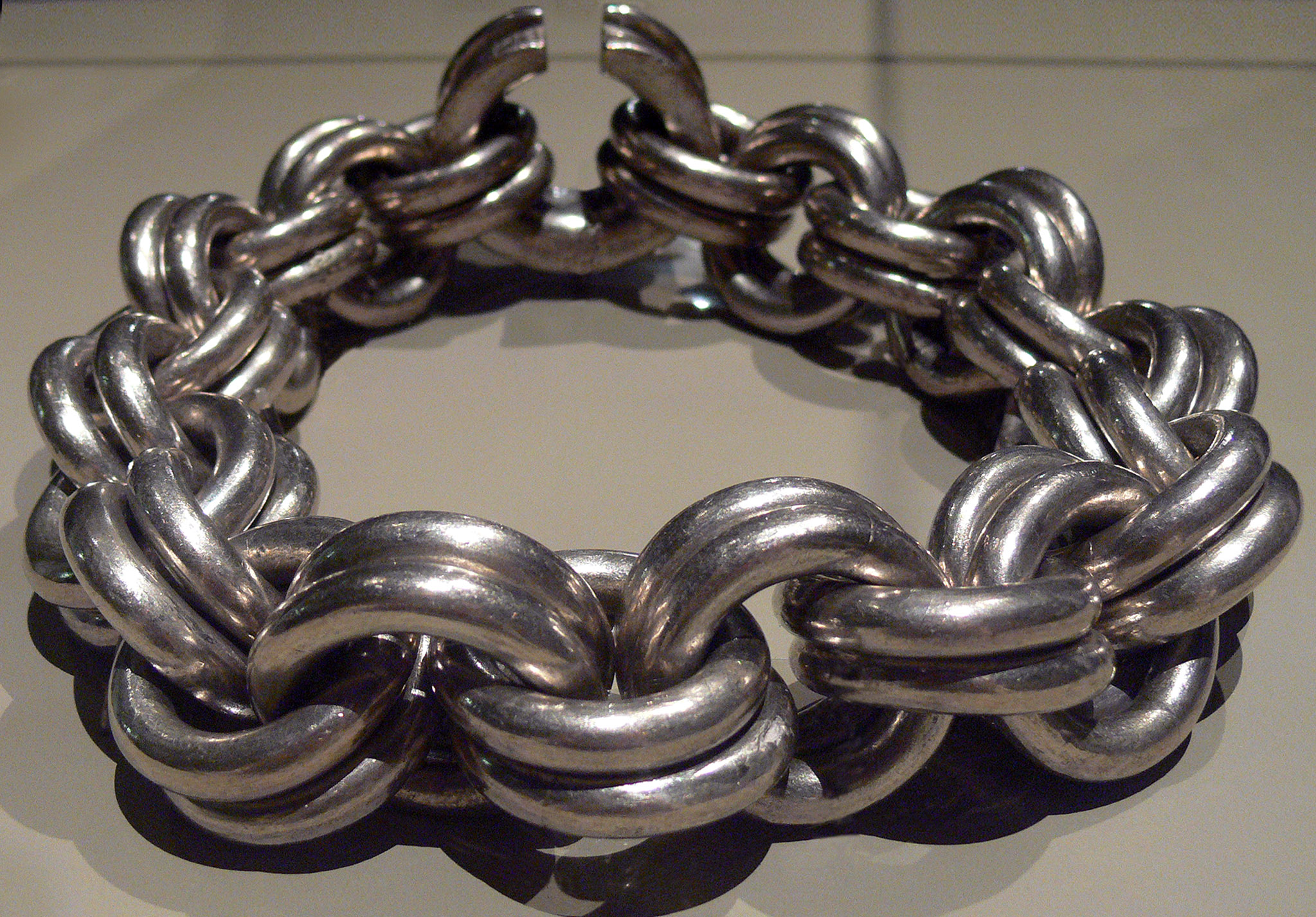
The Whitecleuch Chain, a silver Pictish torc

The intermittent Roman presence in Scotland coincided with the emergence of the Picts, a confederation of tribes who lived to the north of the Forth and Clyde from Roman times until the tenth century. They are often assumed to have been the descendants of the Caledonians though the evidence for this connection is circumstantial and the name by which the Picts called themselves is unknown. The Gaels of Dál Riata called the Picts Cruithne and Irish poets portrayed their Pictish counterparts as very much like themselves.

The technology of everyday life is not well recorded, but archaeological evidence shows for example that precious metal working was widespread and that timber halls were in use over a wide area by the seventh century. Although constructed in earlier times, brochs, roundhouses and crannogs remained in use into and beyond the Pictish period.

The Pictish relationship with Rome appears to have been less overtly hostile than their Caledonian predecessors, at least in the beginning. There were no more pitched battles and conflict was generally limited to raiding parties from both sides of the frontier until immediately prior to and after the Roman retreat from Britannia. As Rome's power waned, the Picts were emboldened. War bands raided south of Hadrian's Wall in earnest in 342, 360, and 365 and they participated with the Attacotti in the Great Conspiracy of 367. Rome fought back, mounting a campaign under Theodosius in 369 and another campaign was mounted in 384, but both were short-lived successes. Rome had fully withdrawn from Britain by 410, never to return.

As the Iron Age in Scotland drew to a close the Picts continued to be the main power in the north. The Hebrides were nominally under Pictish control, although the historical record is sparse. Hunter states that in relation to King Bridei I of the Picts in the sixth century: "As for Shetland, Orkney, Skye and the Western Isles, their inhabitants, most of whom appear to have been Pictish in culture and speech at this time, are likely to have regarded Bridei as a fairly distant presence."

By the close of the fifth century the Votadini in the south east, whose capital was Edinburgh's castle rock and the Damnonii in the west, who eventually formed the Kingdom of Strathclyde based at Alt Clut, remained independent kingdoms.

Dál Riata emerged as a Gaelic kingdom on the western seaboard of Scotland and north-eastern Ireland during the early or mid sixth century. In time they came to rival the Picts for control of the north and "became the cradle of the future kingdom of Scotland".

Norse contacts with Scotland certainly predate the first written records in the 8th century, although their nature and frequency are unknown. Excavations at Norwick on the island of Unst in Shetland indicate that Scandinavian settlers had reached there, perhaps as early as the mid-7th century, consistent with dates produced for Viking levels at Old Scatness. From 793 onwards repeated raids by Vikings on the British Isles are recorded. "All the islands of Britain" were devastated in 794 with Iona being sacked in 802 and 806. Orkney and Shetland were colonised first, and then the Hebrides and significant parts of the west coast as large parts of Scotland became Scandinavian in nature. The terminal dates of the Iron Age in Scotland are "necessarily imprecise" coming earlier in the south than the north, but with the advancing influences on the Picts of Dál Riata in the west and Scandinavians in the north it drew to a close.
