= Bornish =

Coordinates: 57.243°N 7.406°W

Bornish: Scottish Gaelic: Bòrnais
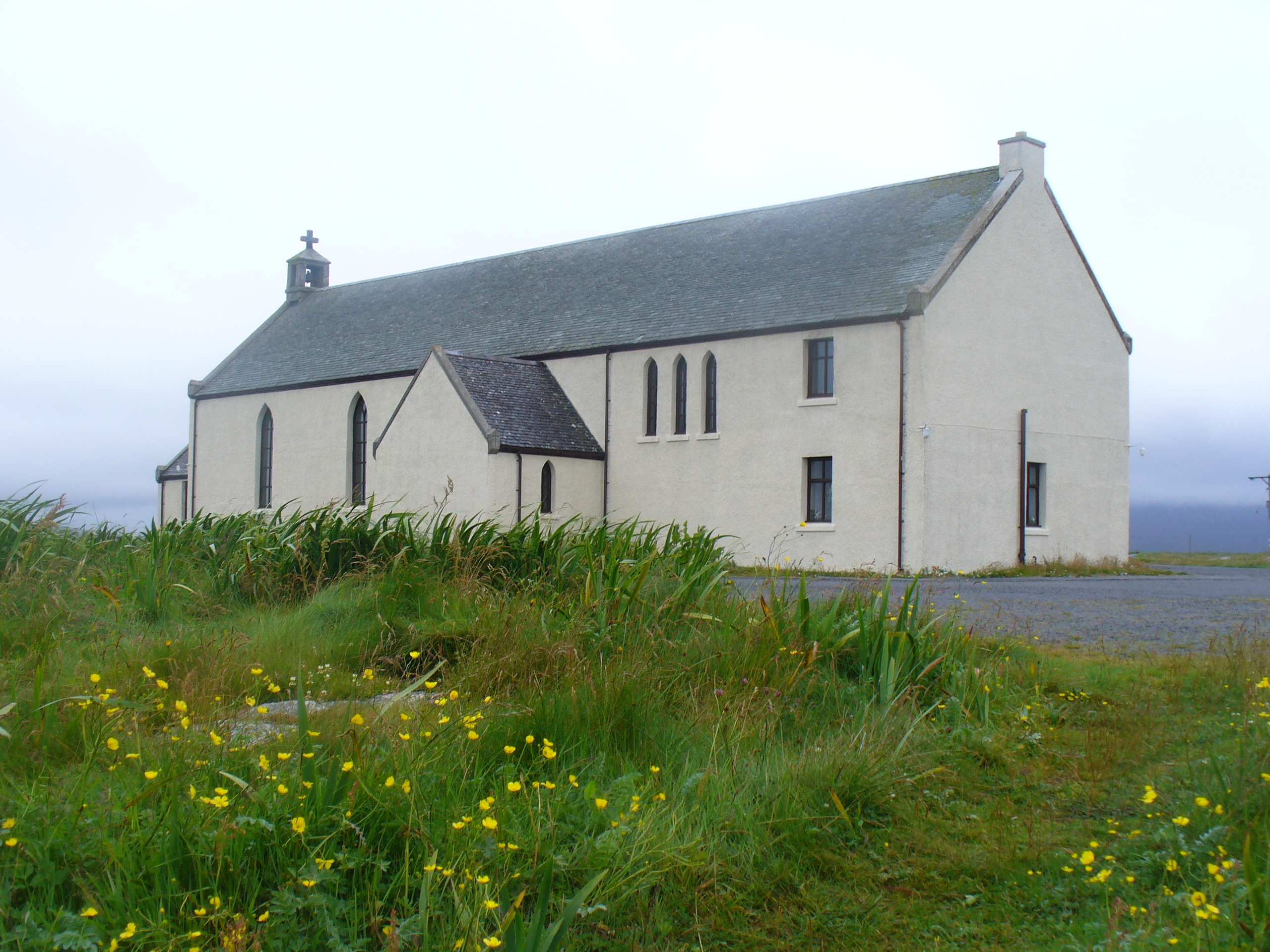
- Saint Mary's Church, Bornish

- Location within the Outer Hebrides
- Language: Scottish Gaelic; English
- OS grid reference: NF739298
- Community council: Bornish
- Council area: Na h-Eileanan Siar
- Lieutenancy area: Western Isles
- Country: Scotland
- Sovereign state: United Kingdom
- Post town: ISLE OF SOUTH UIST
- Postcode district: HS8
- Dialling code: 01878
- Police: Scotland
- Fire: Scottish
- Ambulance: Scottish
- UK Parliament: Na h-Eileanan an Iar
- Scottish Parliament: Na h-Eileanan an Iar

Bornish (Scottish Gaelic: Bòrnais) is a village and community council area on South Uist in the Outer Hebrides, Scotland. Bornish is also within the civil parish of South Uist. The A865 passes through Bornish, on the route between Lochmaddy and Lochboisdale.

== History ==
The construction of nearby Dun Vulan broch has been dated to the period 150–50 BC. Located on the coast, it was originally 10 metres (33 ft) in height, but is now reduced to walls of 1.52 metres (5.0 ft). A Pictish house was later built within the walls.

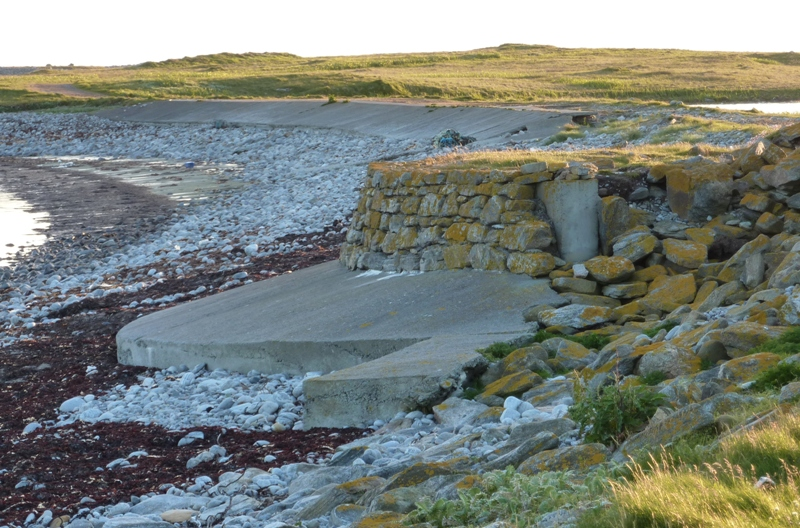
Dun Vulan broch

Excavations of a Norse settlement nearby have provided important information about lifestyles during this period. It suggests that pigs were a more important aspect of Viking farming than prior to that time, that red deer numbers may have been "controlled" rather than the species simply being subject to hunting, that herring fishing became an important commercial consideration and that trade with centres to the south such as Dublin Bay and Bristol may have been important. Coins found at Bornais and nearby Cille Pheadair were produced in Norway, Westphalia, and England, although there were none from Scotland. Walrus ivory from the Norse settlements in Greenland has also been found there.

It is known that Hebrides were taxed using the Ounceland system and evidence from Bornais suggests that settlers there may have been more prosperous than families of a similar status in the Northern Isles, possibly due to a more relaxed political regime.
