= Coldoch Broch =

Iron Age broch in Stirlingshire, Scotland

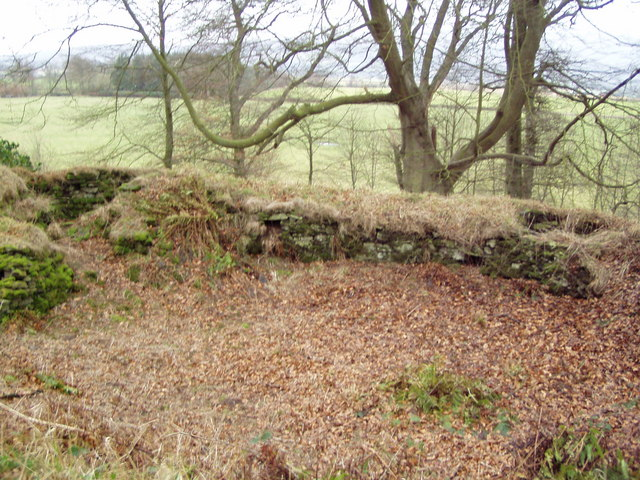
- Interior of Coldoch Broch

- Location in Stirlingshire
- 56°09′29″N 4°06′01″W
- Type: Broch
- Periods: Iron Age
- Location: Stirlingshire

Coldoch Broch is an Iron Age broch located in Stirlingshire in central Scotland (grid reference NS69649813).

== Location ==
Coldoch Broch is located 4.5 kilometres southwest of Doune. It stands on a slight rise immediately next to the flat land of the Forth Valley – originally an extensive marsh. As recently as 2007 the site was described as being "overgrown with turf and weeds".

== Description ==
The broch has a maximum internal diameter of 8.8 metres and stands up to 2.4 metres in height. The entrance is on the east side, and is unusually narrow. The entrance passage is about 5.8 metres long, and has no guard cell. The interior of the broch has three intramural rooms, which are approximately rectangular in shape. There is a doorway to the intramural stair.

== Excavations ==
The broch was apparently cleared out just before 1870, and although a plan was prepared, a report on the excavation never appeared.

== See also ==
- Leckie Broch, 3 miles to the south
