= Leckie Broch =

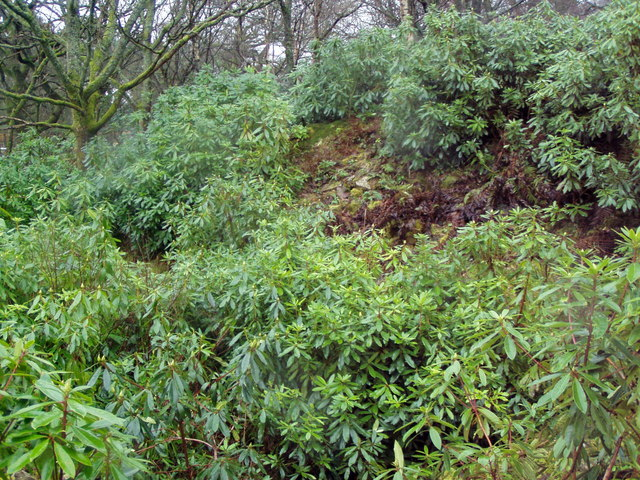
- Overgrown interior of Leckie Broch

- Location in Stirlingshire
- 56°07′12″N 4°06′20″W
- Type: Broch
- Periods: Iron Age, Roman
- Location: Stirlingshire

Leckie Broch is an iron-age broch located in Stirlingshire, Scotland.

== Location ==
Just above the confluence of two streams with deep gulleys on the southern foothills of the Forth Valley. West of Gargunnock, it can be accessed from the track to Knock-o-Ronald by following the path up the East side of Leckie burn. Recent visitors to the site have stated that it is very overgrown with rhododendrons. On a recent visit (July 2018) the site was found (by B Wilson, University of New England) to be almost entirely inaccessible due to the dense stand of rhododendron. Clearance of rhododendron in 2020 now makes access much easier. Take the path just east of Saw mill cottage, to the east side of Leckie Burn. Follow the path til you cross the "1878" bridge. Turn right along the "ridge" and the Broch can be seen about 100m ahead.

== History ==
The broch became known to archaeologists in the 1960s. Until the beginning of the 19th century the area was covered in impassible swamps and bogs that prohibited the detailed exploration of the area. The broch was excavated between 1970 and 1978 by archaeologists.

== Description ==
The broch is one of only a handful of brochs found in southern Scotland. Due to the destruction of the walls, it is unknown how high the original broch was. The archaeologists who excavated it believed that it was a hollowed tower type broch with an internal wood structure. The site has several phases and has been dated from the Roman period; this is known because the excavations found several kinds of dating evidence including Roman pottery, glass, coins, and radiocarbon measurements.

1. The first phase appears to be a hut under the later broch. A group of sheep bones in a post hole gave a C-14 date of AD 80 ± 70.
2. Construction: The broch was built next and Roman Samian pottery, with stamps, puts the construction after AD 79 or 80.
3. Inhabitation of the tower for roughly 60 years.
4. Destruction of Broch: There was evidence of a fire and sudden collapse of the broch.
5. Re-occupation of the broch occurs after the fire and some repairs are undertaken and a roundhouse created.
6. The site is fortified but then abandoned.
7. A medieval coin was found but it is not thought that anything significant occurred after the site was abandoned in the 2nd century AD.

It has been hypothesized that it was originally a broch but after that was destroyed it was rebuilt as a promontory fort. However, some have questioned if the second phase is in fact a promontory fort.

== Archaeological finds ==
The eight years of archaeological excavations resulted in multiple finds like broochs and armlets. These finds are currently held by The Hunterian Museum and Art Gallery at the University of Glasgow. Pictures of some of these finds can be viewed at the Hunterian website.

== See also ==
- Coldoch Broch, 3 miles to the north
