= Dun Mor Vaul =

Iron-age broch on the north coast of the island of Tiree, Scotland

- Dùn Mòr
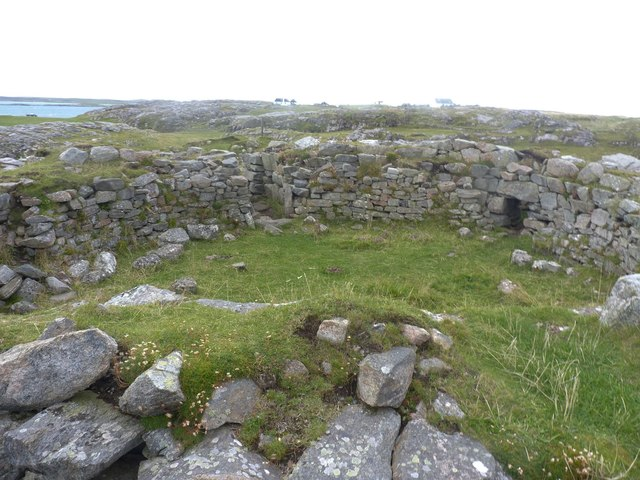
- Interior of Dun Mor

- Shown within Coll and Tiree
- 56°32′31″N 6°48′49″W
- Type: Broch
- Periods: Iron Age
- Location: Tiree

Dun Mor Vaul (or simply Dun Mor; Scottish Gaelic: Dùn Mòr) is an iron-age broch located on the north coast of the island of Tiree, in Scotland.

== Description ==
Dun Mor (grid reference NM04234927) is situated on a rocky knoll on the northern coast of island of Tiree, about 1 kilometre northwest of the hamlet of Vaul. The broch consists of a drystone tower with an internal diameter of 9.2 metres with walls about 4.5 metres thick. The outer face of the wall survives to a maximum height of 2.2 metres. The entrance is on the southeast side. On the north side of the entrance passage is a small side-chamber, of a type usually called a "guard cell". The intramural cavity is well-preserved, and there are the remains of a staircase, which led to the upper levels, on the north side.

The broch was additionally protected by two outer lines of defence, one drawn round the irregular margin of the summit on all sides, and the other taking the form of a hornwork which restricted access from the landward side of the knoll.

== Excavations ==
The broch was partly excavated around 1880, and it was almost completely excavated by E. W. MacKie in 1962–4.

The excavations showed that there had been two phases of occupation before the broch was built. In the earliest phase (5th century BC) there appears to have been a wooden hut, which may have been destroyed by fire. This was followed by a more extensive settlement occupying a larger proportion of the summit area. After an interval of unknown duration (possibly several centuries) the knoll was reoccupied and the construction of the broch and its outworks began.

The construction of the broch was dated by radiocarbon dating to the 1st century AD. It appears to have been used initially as a communal refuge, but by the 2nd century it had become instead the permanent residence of a single family. Before long the upper storeys of the broch wall were demolished, and a round house (or an aisled wheel-house) was constructed within the interior. It seems the broch was abandoned in the mid 3rd-century, the latest datable artefact from the interior being a fragment of a Roman glass bowl made in the Rhineland between 160 and 250 AD.

The finds include large quantities of native pottery sherds; fragments of Roman glass and samian-ware and coarse-ware vessels; bronze and silver spiral finger-rings; rotary querns; quartzite strike-lights; glass ring-beads; tools and dice of bone; and several tools used in weaving and the working of metals. The finds are now in the Hunterian Museum, University of Glasgow.
