= Dun Vulan =

Iron Age broch in South Uist, Scotland

Dun Vulan Broch
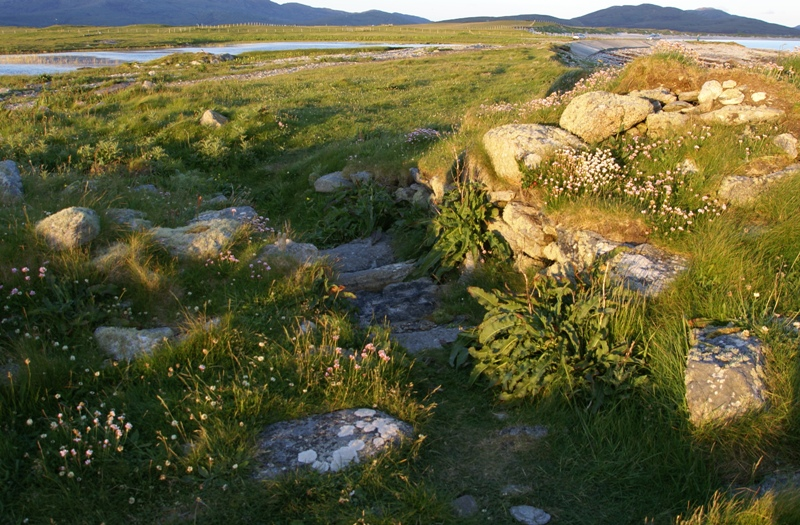
- Eastern entrance of Dun Vulan

- Location in Highlands, Scotland
- 57°14′26″N 7°26′57″W
- Type: Broch
- Periods: Iron Age, Roman
- Location: South Uist

Dun Vulan Broch (Scottish Gaelic: 'Dùn Mhùlan' or 'Dùn Mhaoilinn') is an Iron Age broch in South Uist, Scotland.

== Location ==
Dun Vulan is located in South Uist. The site is now situated on an exposed promontory but was originally on a freshwater lake.

== Description ==
Dun Vulan is an Iron Age (c. 150–50 BC) broch located on the southern edge of the promontory; it is now protected as a sea wall. Excavations revealed an oval-shaped broch with a maximum diameter of 19.5 metres, with walls surviving to 4.5 metres in height and 4 metres in width.

== History ==
Between June 1991 and July 1996 Dun Vulan was excavated as part of the SEARCH (Sheffield Environmental and Archaeological Research Campaign in the Hebrides) Project. The excavations suggested that there were no earlier structures predating the main structure on site.
