= Bowdun Head =

Headland landform on the North Sea coast

Coordinates: 56°57′05″N 2°11′40″W

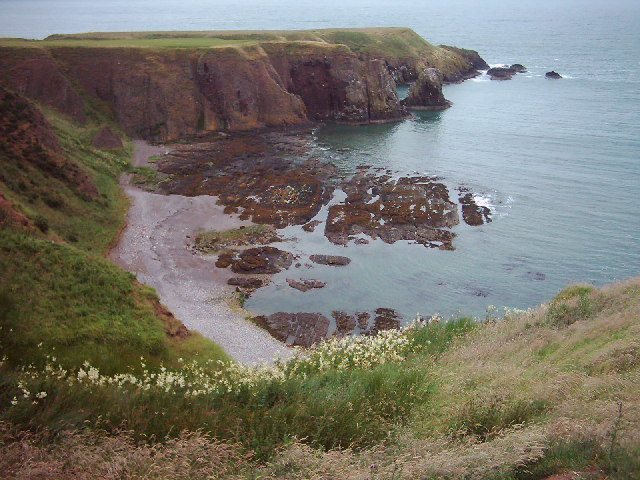
Looking northeast across Castle Haven to Bowdun Head

Bowdun Head is a headland landform on the North Sea coast approximately one kilometre south of Stonehaven, Scotland.(Ordnance Survey, 2004) Slightly to the north is another headland, Downie Point. Somewhat to the south along the coast is Dunnottar Castle on the far side of the bay of Castle Haven. Other historic structures in the general vicinity include the Stonehaven Tolbooth, Fetteresso Castle, the Chapel of St. Mary and St. Nathalan and Muchalls Castle. There is considerable prehistory associated with the local area including a Pictish hill fort on the sea stack of Dunnicaer immediately to the north, and Bronze Age archaeological sites at Fetteresso (Hogan, 2008) and Spurryhillock, both somewhat inland of Bowdun Head.

== See also ==
- Fowlsheugh
