= Dunnicaer =

Sea stack and remains of Pictish hill fort in Aberdeenshire, Scotland

Coordinates: 56°57′10″N 02°11′43″W

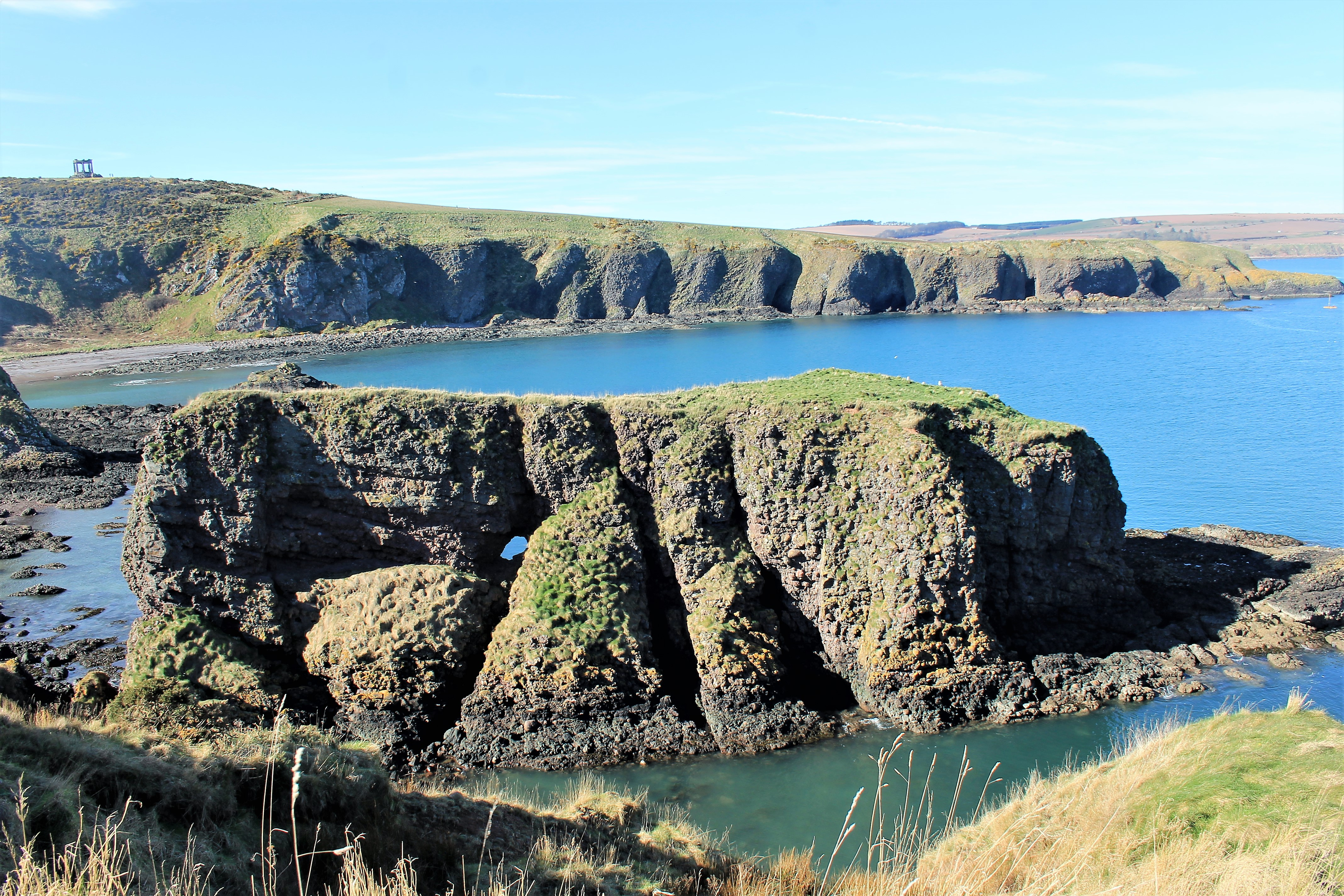
Dunnicaer from Bowdun Head to the south

Dunnicaer, or Dun-na-caer, is a precipitous sea stack just off the coast of Aberdeenshire, Scotland, between Dunnottar Castle and Stonehaven. Despite the unusual difficulty of access, in 1832 Pictish symbol stones were found on the summit and 21st-century archaeology has discovered evidence of a Pictish hill fort which may have incorporated the stones in its structure. The stones may have been incised in the third or fourth centuries AD but this goes against the general archaeological view that the simplest and earliest (Class I) symbol stones date from the fifth or even seventh century AD.

Additionally, there it is the possibility that Dunnicaer was a Roman trade fortification, similar to the Drumanagh fort promontory in Ireland, according to the "Archaeological Journal" of the University of Aberdeen.

== Sea stack ==
Dunnicaer in Scotland.

Sited between Stonehaven and the similarly situated Dunnottar Castle, the sea stack is in Strathlethan Bay, with Downie Point to the north and just offshore from the cliffs at Bowdun Head to the south. It is cut off from the mainland at high tide and the flat, grassy summit is entirely surrounded by precipitous cliffs some 30–35 metres (100–115 ft) high. The conglomerate rock is lower Old Red Sandstone. At the time of the hill fort the location may have been a promontory and subsequent erosion of the cliffs has turned it into a stack with a summit plateau about 20 by 12 metres (66 ft × 39 ft), much smaller than it was in Pictish times.

== Hill fort ==
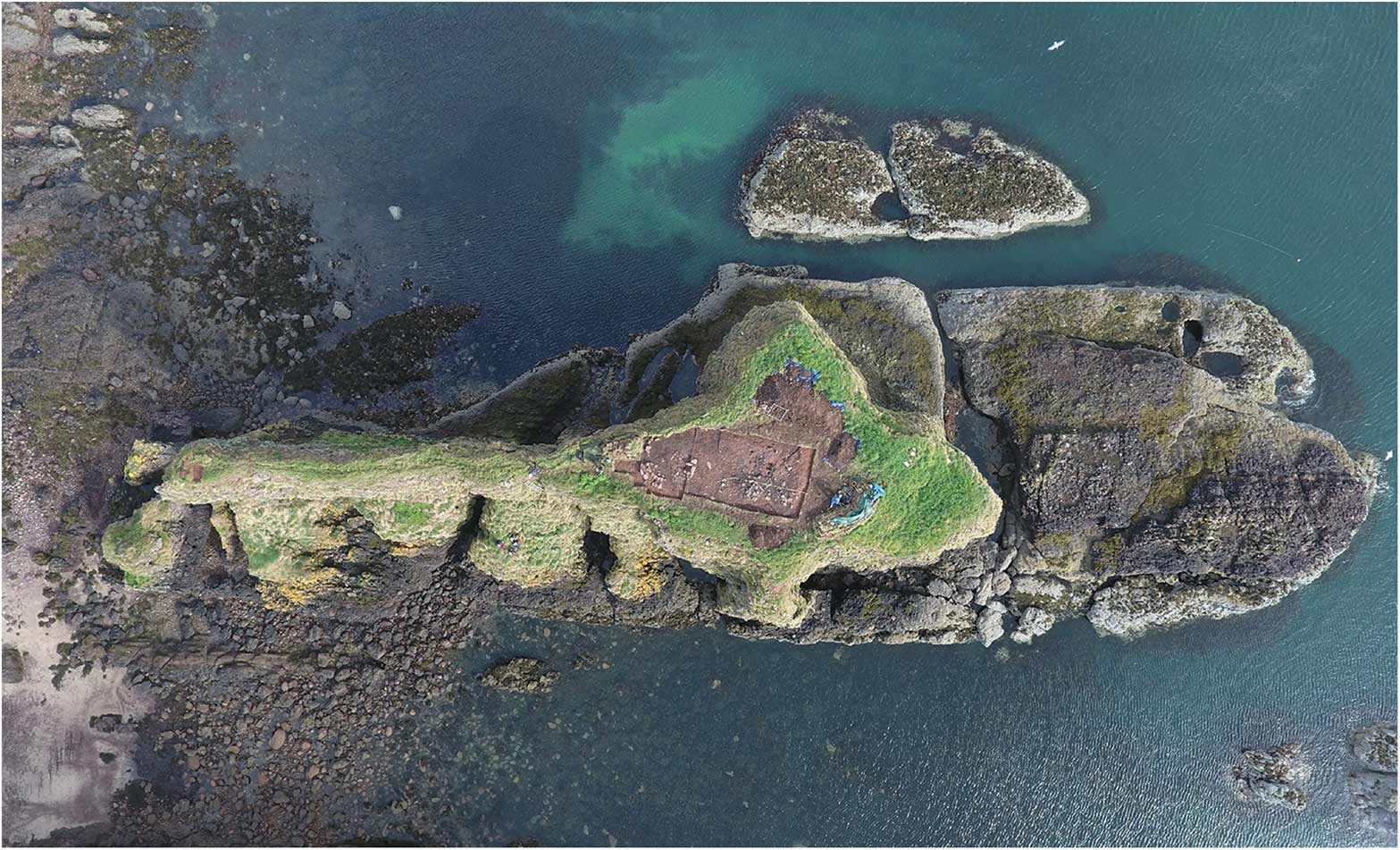
Aerial photo of fort excavation (north is to the top right)

Aerial video
- Drone photography of Dunnicaer during excavation

During archaeological investigations on the summit in 1977 and 1982 nothing of significance was found. In 2015 new excavations by an Aberdeen University team started to reveal the presence of a hill fort and excavations were continued in the following years. There had been a stone rampart framed with timbers leading southwest to the mainland. From radiocarbon dating of the timber the fort has been dated to being used between the second and fourth centuries AD making it the earliest known Pictish fort in Scotland. (Note: In particular, it predates any archaeological finds at the site of Dunnottar Castle to the south.) A hearth and the footings of internal rooms have been found. Glass, samian ware and black-burnished ware pottery and a lead weight have been excavated: all unusual for so far north of the frontier of the Roman empire. Over the centuries some parts of the fort have collapsed away with the erosion of the surrounding cliffs, particularly to the east.

The discoveries suggest that the fort was a substantial, high-status building, with stone and oak timbers brought in from a distance. It was later abandoned, possibly when the inhabitants moved to Dunnottar, (Note: Dunnottar is described in the Annals of Ulster as being under siege in 681 and 694 AD, presumably derived from accounts recorded contemporaneously at Iona.) and possibly because of problems with the erosion of the stack.

Dunnicaer, Aberdeenshire, a now isolated sea stack, is the ﬁndspot of ﬁve Pictish symbol stones discovered in the nineteenth century. Excavations from 2015 to 2017 have revealed a Roman Iron Age promontory fort, providing insights into the development of fortiﬁed settlement in north-east Scotland, with fortiﬁed sites being a key feature of ﬁrst millennium AD elite practice in this region. The presence of rare and unusual ﬁnds indicates contact with the Roman world to the south......One impressive (similar) fort with Roman material is the 16 ha multivallate promontory fort at Drumanagh (near Dublin), which has revealed a signiﬁcant quantity of Roman artefacts. Most of these ﬁnds remain unpublished, but there are ﬁrst and second century AD pottery and coin ﬁnds, ingots and a seal box. At 16 ha we are obviously dealing with a diﬀerent phenomenon at Drumanagh to the much more modest site of Dunnicaer.

— Gordon Noble, Nicholas Evans et al., pg. 64

== Symbol stones ==
Lithographs of symbol stones (1856 & 1867)

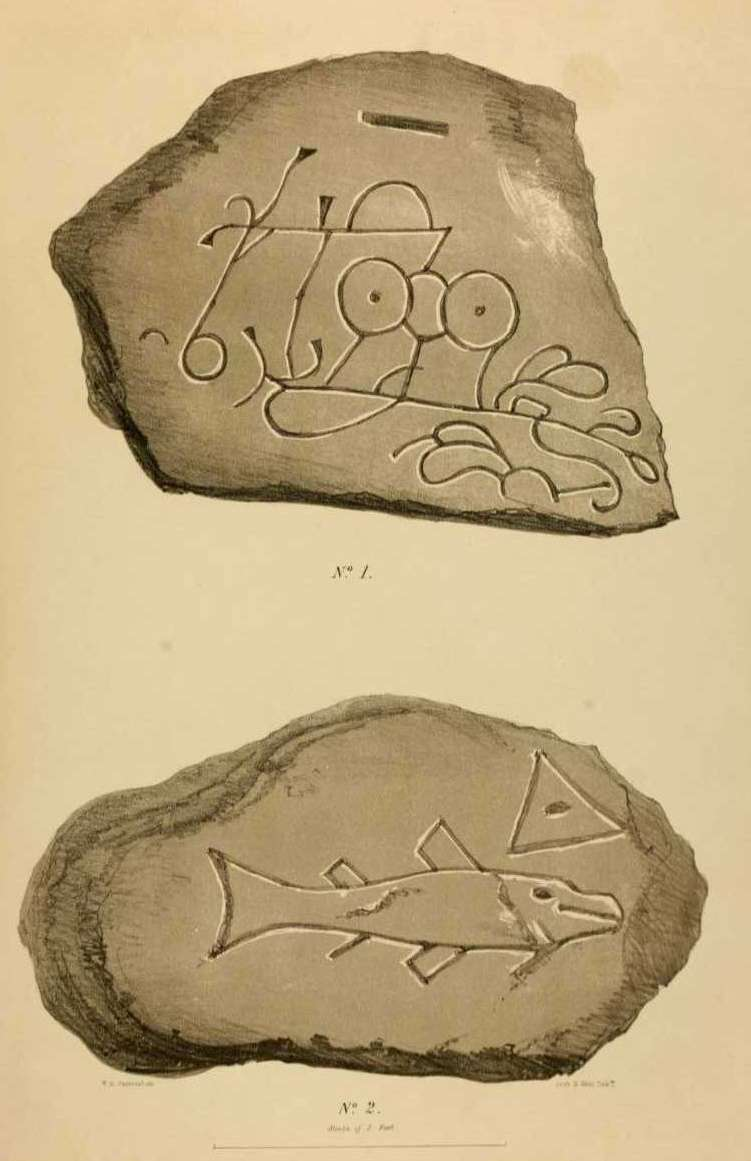
Illustrator: P.A. Jastrzębski (Note: Jastrzębski acknowledged by Stuart as "Mr. Jastresbski" but the plate is signed "P.A. Jastrzębski". The lithographers were the Aberdeen firm of Keith and Gibb.)
(1) 0.69 m x 0.46 m – double disc and Z-rod
(2) 0.68 m x 0.38 m – fish symbol with triangle and central dot

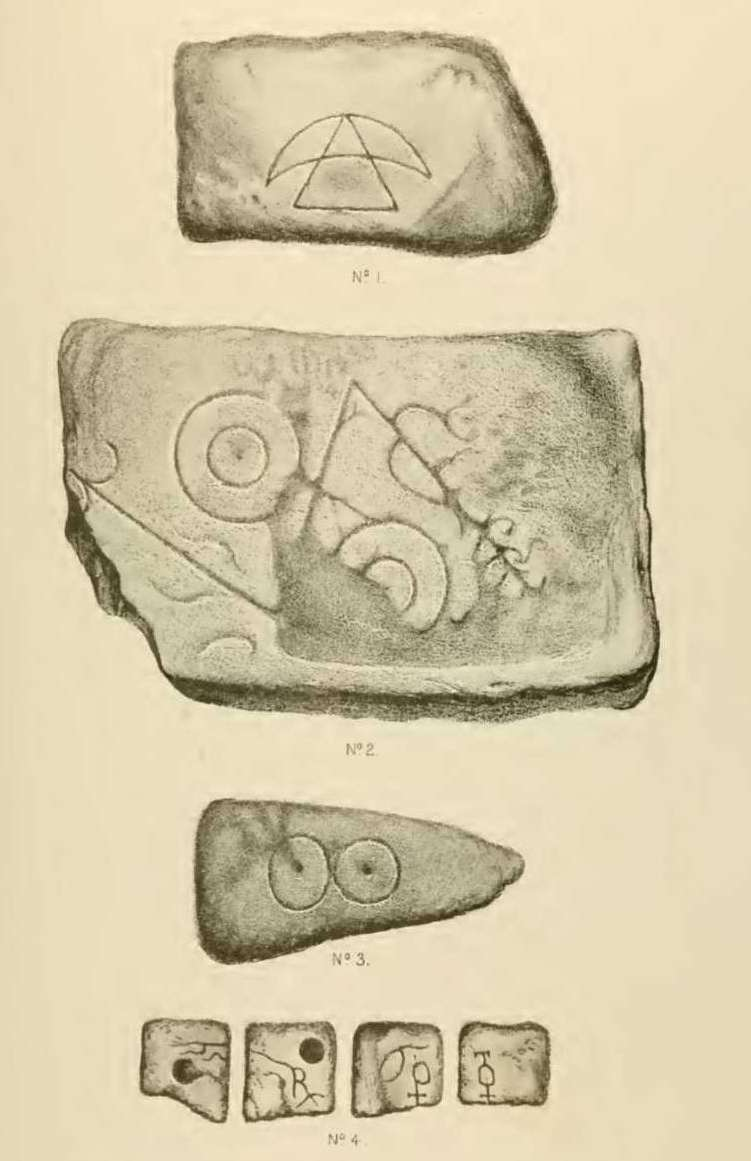
Illustrator: Andrew Gibb
(1) 0.46 m x 0.23 m – crescent with triangle

(2) 0.68 m x 0.38 m – double disc and Z-rod
(3) 0.38 m x 0.15 m – double disc

(4) 0.1 m cube – various incisions

As early as 1819 a symbol stone had been prised from the stack to be used as a hearthstone but the inscriptions had excited little interest. In 1832 some youths had climbed up and found a wall on the summit plateau of the stack. They threw some of the stones down into the sea and when they were later recovered some of them proved to be Pictish symbol stones.

In 1857 these symbol stones were documented by Alexander Thomson. (Note: Historic Environment Scotland dates this to 1860 but the Archaeology Data Service gives 1857. Thomson called the site "Dinnacair" but there is no reason to suppose this was because of a disappointing reaction from his colleagues in Glasgow.) They were illustrated in John Stuart's 1856 and 1867 volumes of The Sculptured Stones of Scotland published by the Spalding Club. A thorough description of the symbols was published in 1992. One stone is now in the Marischal Museum and the others are at Banchory House. (Note: Banchory House became known as Banchory-Devenick House or Beannachar House. The cubic stone is missing; the 0.68 m x 0.38 m double disc and Z-rod stone is in the Marischal Museum; and the others are at Beannacher House.) The design and relatively small size of the stones is unusual and it shows them to be of an early date – they were probably set into the wall of the rampart that has been dated as third to fourth century AD. – this is a much earlier date than the conventional view that the simplest and earliest (Class I) stones are from the fifth or even seventh century AD.
