= Strathlethan Bay =

Bay on North Sea coast of Aberdeenshire, Scotland

Coordinates: 56°57′18″N 02°11′44″W

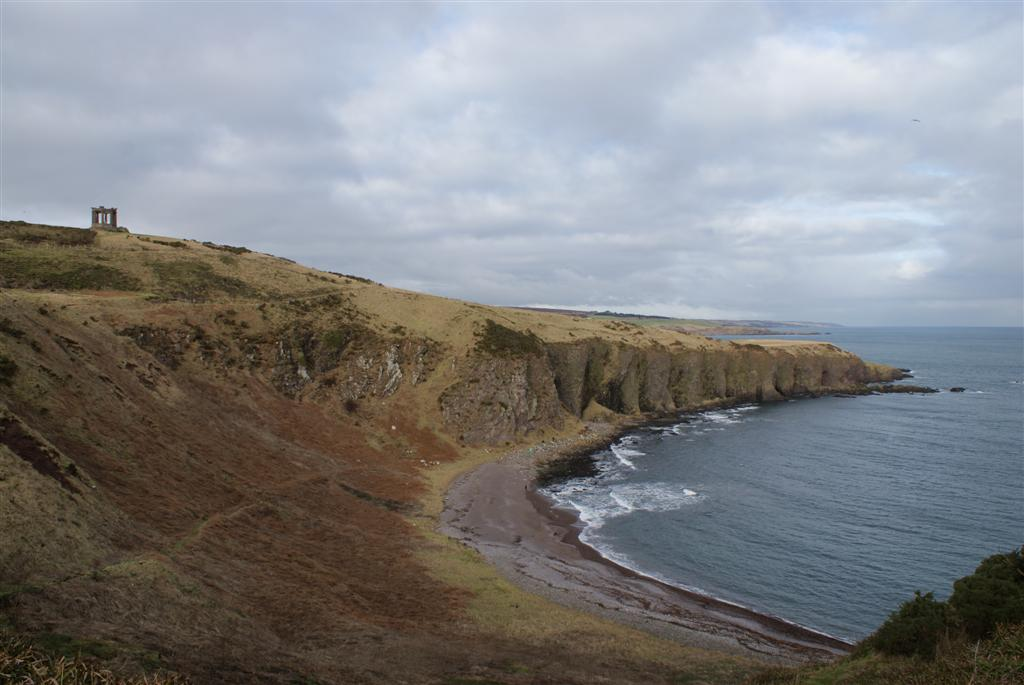
Looking northeast over the bay to Downie Point and the war memorial

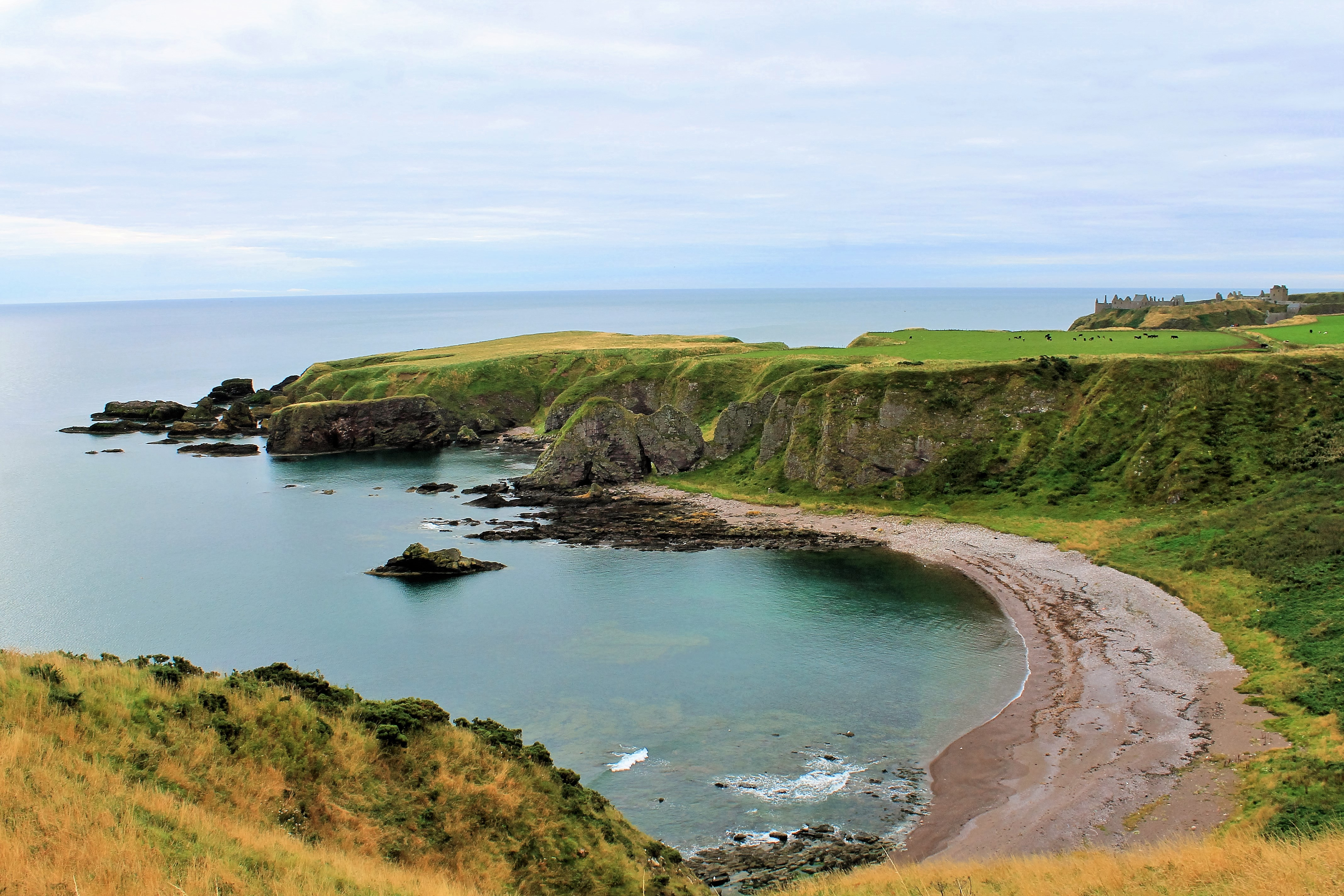
Looking southeast over the bay to Bowdun Head with Dunnicaer in front of the headland. Dunnottar Castle on the horizon (right).

Strathlethan Bay is on the North Sea coast of Aberdeenshire, Scotland just south of Stonehaven. To the north is Downie Point near which lies Stonehaven's Black Hill war memorial – the popular walk from Stonehaven to Dunnottar Castle runs along this part of the trail. On the other side of the bay is Dunnicaer, an inaccessible sea stack just offshore of Bowdun Head. The long-distance Aberdeenshire Coastal Trail runs around the bay at the top of steep cliffs. On 19 November 1916 the wreckage of the Norwegian steamer Isa Fiord (meaning ice fiord) was washed ashore in the bay and on 8 October 1940 the Danish ship Bellona II came aground after it had suffered bombing damage off Gourdon.
