= Kirktown of Fetteresso =

Well-preserved village near Stonehaven, Scotland

Coordinates: 56°57′49″N 2°14′27″W

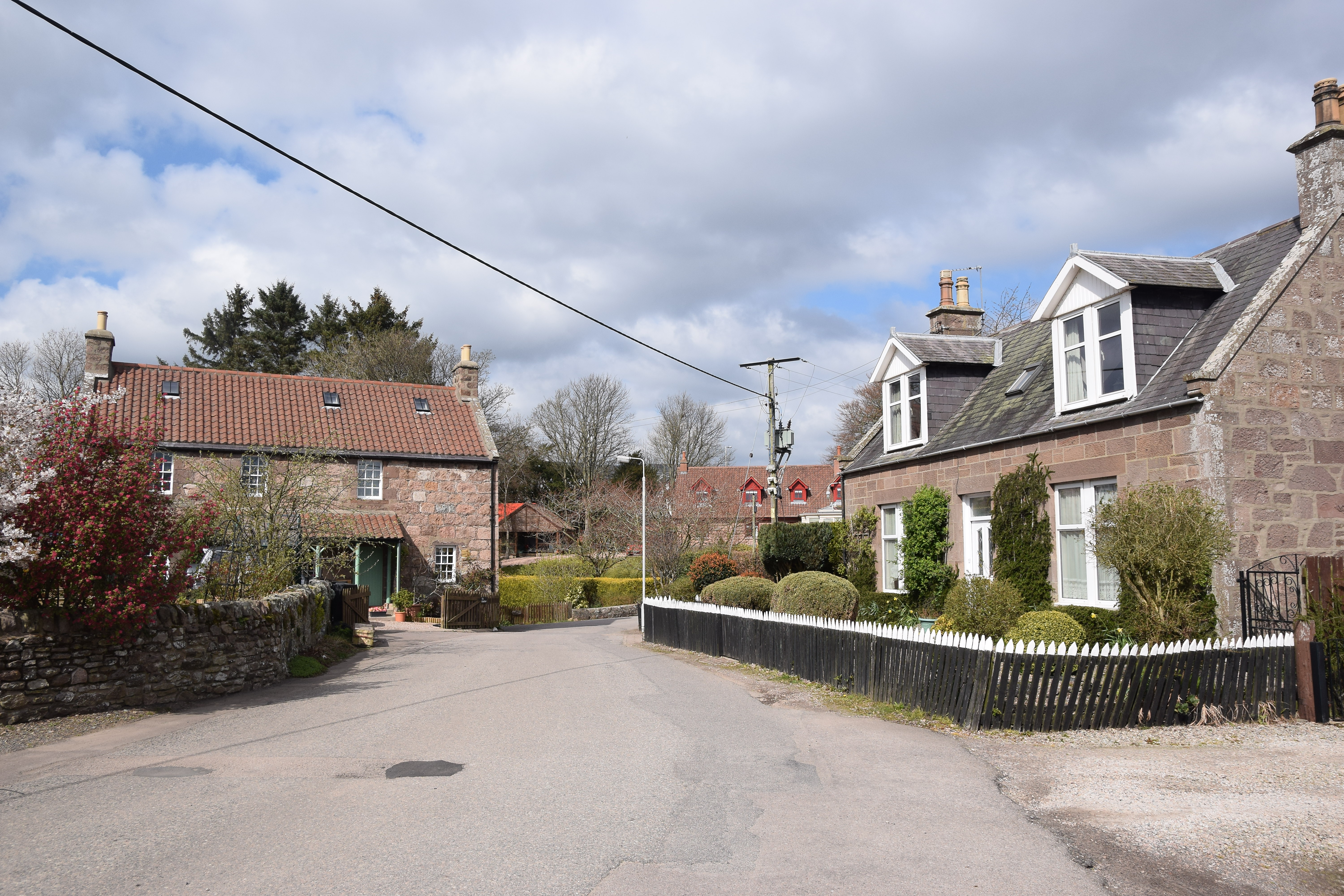

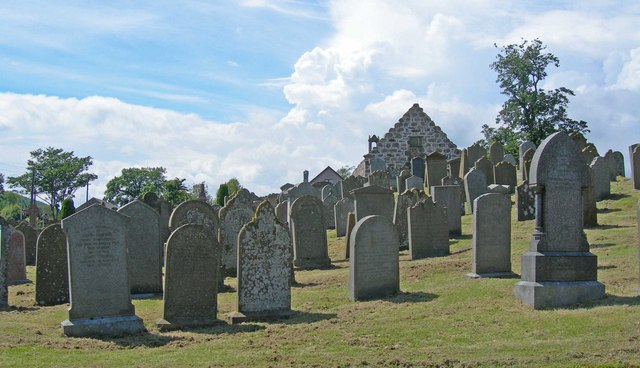
Graveyard at Saint Ciarans Church, Kirktown of Fetteresso

The Kirktown of Fetteresso is a well-preserved village near Stonehaven, Scotland. In the planning area of Kincardine and Mearns, Aberdeenshire, this village contains many very old stone residential structures as well as the Church of St. Ciarans and its associated graveyard. The Carron Water winds through the Kirktown of Fetteresso, and Fetteresso Castle, a listed building, lies at the northwestern verge. Some of the earliest area prehistory has been found nearby on the Fetteresso Estate grounds, where there have been archaeological finds from the Bronze Age.

Fetteresso was the birthplace of Alexander Wood, who emigrated to Toronto in 1793 and became a noted businessman and magistrate.

Today, the Dundee–Aberdeen line passes the village. The Stonehaven bypass, now part of the A90, passes between the village and Stonehaven.

== See also ==
- Red Cloak
- Tewel
