= List of listed buildings in Dunnottar =

This is a list of listed buildings in the parish of Dunnottar in Aberdeenshire, Scotland.

== List ==
Name	Location	Date Listed	Grid Ref. (Note: Sometimes known as OSGB36, the grid reference (where provided) is based on the British national grid reference system used by the Ordnance Survey. • "Guide to National Grid". Ordnance Survey. • "Get-a-map". Ordnance Survey.)	Geo-coordinates	Notes	LB Number (Note: Historic Environment Scotland assign a unique alphanumeric identifier to each designated site in Scotland, for listed buildings this always begins with "LB", for example "LB12345".)	Image
Dunnottar Castle - Stables				56°56′44″N 2°11′51″W	Category B	2900	Upload Photo
Dunnottar Castle - Entrance Gateway And Guardrooms				56°56′46″N 2°11′54″W	Category A	2919	Upload Photo
Dunnottar Castle - Benholms Lodgings				56°56′46″N 2°11′54″W	Category A	2920	Upload Photo
Stonehaven Radio Station				56°56′47″N 2°12′46″W	Category C(S)	49976	Upload Photo
Dunnottar Castle - Well				56°56′46″N 2°11′47″W	Category B	2905	Upload another image
Dunnottar Castle - Smithy				56°56′45″N 2°11′52″W	Category B	2899	Upload another image
Dunnottar Castle - Quadrangle				56°56′46″N 2°11′46″W	Category B	2904	Upload Photo
Glaslaw Bridge Over Glaslaw Burn				56°57′01″N 2°13′33″W	Category C(S)	2907	Upload Photo
Bracklaywaird Farmhouse				56°56′51″N 2°17′15″W	Category C(S)	2908	Upload Photo
By Stonehaven, Green Den				56°57′31″N 2°12′55″W	Category B	6640	Upload Photo
Dunnottar Castle - Priest's House				56°56′45″N 2°11′51″W	Category B	2901	Upload Photo
Dunnottar Castle - Grave-Yard Walls				56°56′45″N 2°11′49″W	Category B	2902	Upload Photo
Dunnottar Castle - East Guardhouse				56°56′44″N 2°11′46″W	Category B	2906	Upload Photo
Auquhirie Farmhouse				56°57′24″N 2°17′05″W	Category C(S)	2909	Upload Photo
War Memorial, Black Hill				56°57′18″N 2°12′10″W	Category C(S)	2918	Upload another image See more images
Marischal Aisle				56°57′28″N 2°13′36″W	Category B	2915	Upload Photo
Dunnottar House				56°57′26″N 2°13′37″W	Category C(S)	2916	Upload Photo
Invercarron Tollhouse				56°57′39″N 2°12′47″W	Category C(S)	2917	Upload Photo
Dunnottar House (Former) Walled Gardens And Shell House				56°57′21″N 2°13′21″W	Category B	6609	Upload Photo
Dunnottar Castle - Approach Tunnels				56°56′45″N 2°11′52″W	Category B	2897	Upload Photo
Dunnottar Castle - Keep				56°56′45″N 2°11′53″W	Category A	2898	Upload Photo
Dunnottar Castle - Chapel				56°56′45″N 2°11′47″W	Category B	2903	Upload Photo
Dunnottar Parish Kirk				56°57′28″N 2°13′38″W	Category B	2914	Upload Photo

== Key ==
The scheme for classifying buildings in Scotland is:

- Category A: "buildings of national or international importance, either architectural or historic; or fine, little-altered examples of some particular period, style or building type."
- Category B: "buildings of regional or more than local importance; or major examples of some particular period, style or building type, which may have been altered."
- Category C: "buildings of local importance; lesser examples of any period, style, or building type, as originally constructed or moderately altered; and simple traditional buildings which group well with other listed buildings."

In March 2016 there were 47,288 listed buildings in Scotland. Of these, 8% were Category A, and 50% were Category B, with the remaining 42% being Category C.

== See also ==
- List of listed buildings in Aberdeenshire
