= Downie Point =

Prominent headland at the southern edge of Stonehaven Bay in Scotland

Coordinates: 56.9585°N 2.1958°W

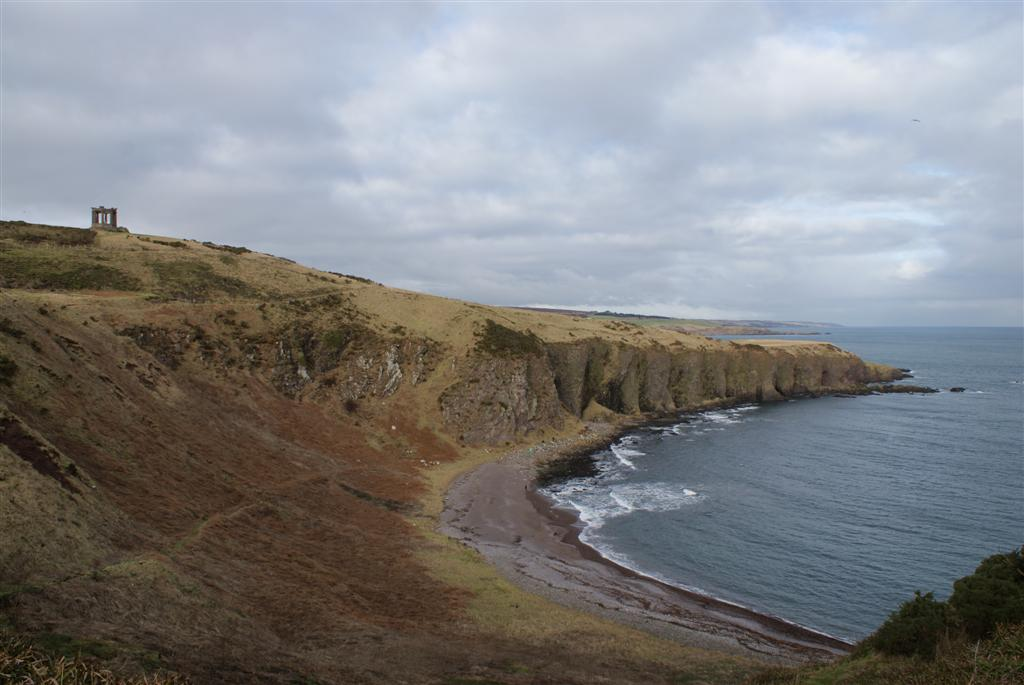
Looking northeast across Strathlethan Bay to Dowie Point

Downie Point is a prominent headland located at the southern edge of Stonehaven Bay in Aberdeenshire, Scotland. (United Kingdom, 2004) From the Stonehaven Harbour, there is a panoramic view of this cliff landform, especially from the tip of Bellman's Head.

== History ==
Earliest known prehistory of the general area relates to Bronze Age discoveries at Spurryhillock and Fetteresso. (Hogan, 2008) To the south of Downie Point is Bowdun Head, on which elements of the early settlement of Stonehaven are situated. Slightly further to the south is the ruined Dunnottar Castle.

== See also ==
- Carron Water
