= Stonehaven Tolbooth =

Historic building in Stonehaven, Scotland

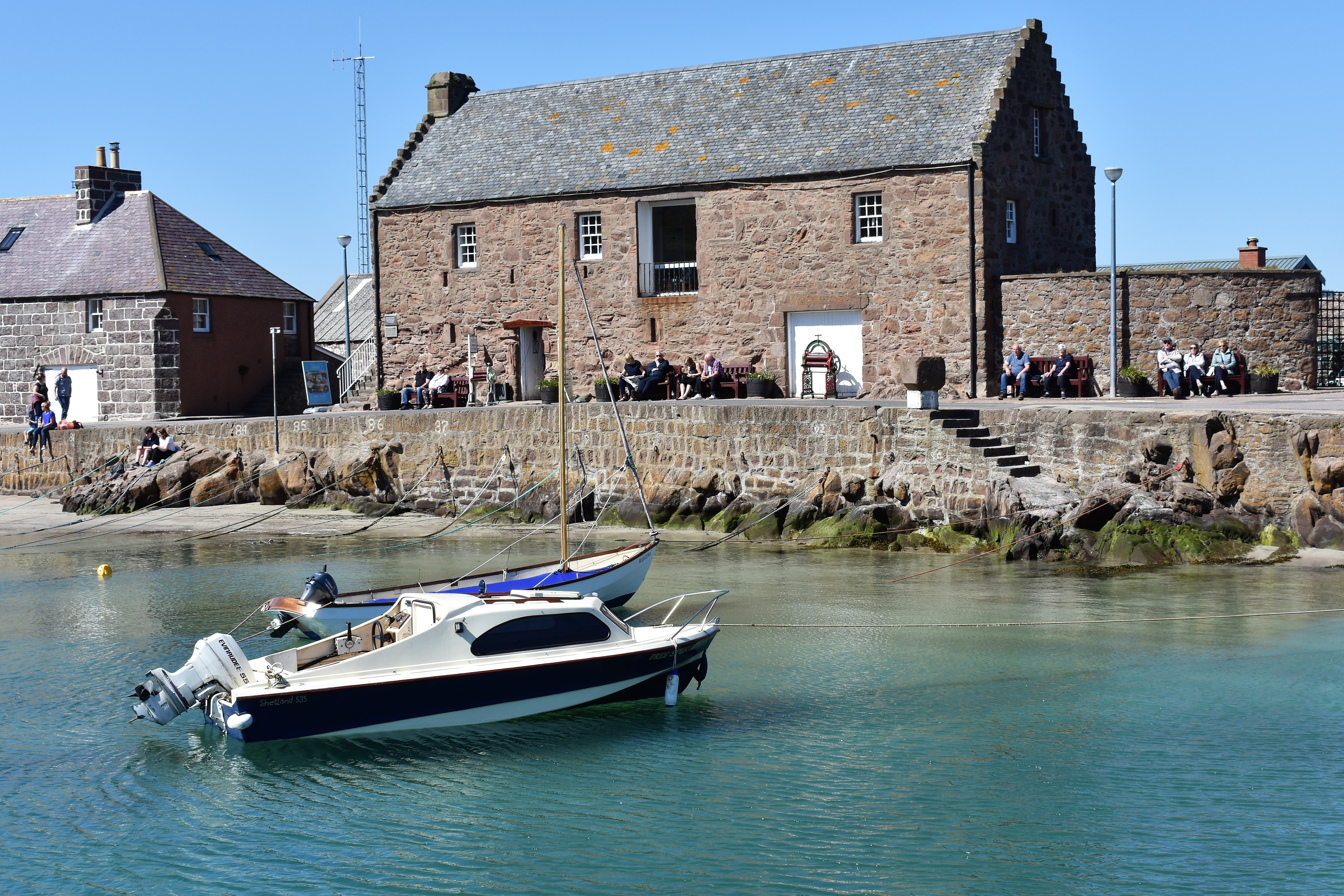

- Location: Stonehaven, Aberdeenshire
- Coordinates: 56°57′39″N 2°12′08″W
- Security class: Originally used as a courthouse and then a prison
- Opened: late 16th century by George Keith
- Website: Stonehaven Tolbooth Website

The Stonehaven Tolbooth is a late 16th-century stone building originally used as a courthouse and a prison in the town of Stonehaven, Aberdeenshire, Scotland. Constructed of local Old Red Sandstone, the prison probably attained its greatest note, when three local Episcopalian clergymen were imprisoned for holding services for more than nine people (a limit established to discourage the Episcopalian religion in the mid-18th century). Lying midway along the old north quay of the Stonehaven Harbour, the present day Tolbooth serves as a local museum with a restaurant on the floor above the ground floor. It is a category A listed building.

== History ==
=== Early history ===
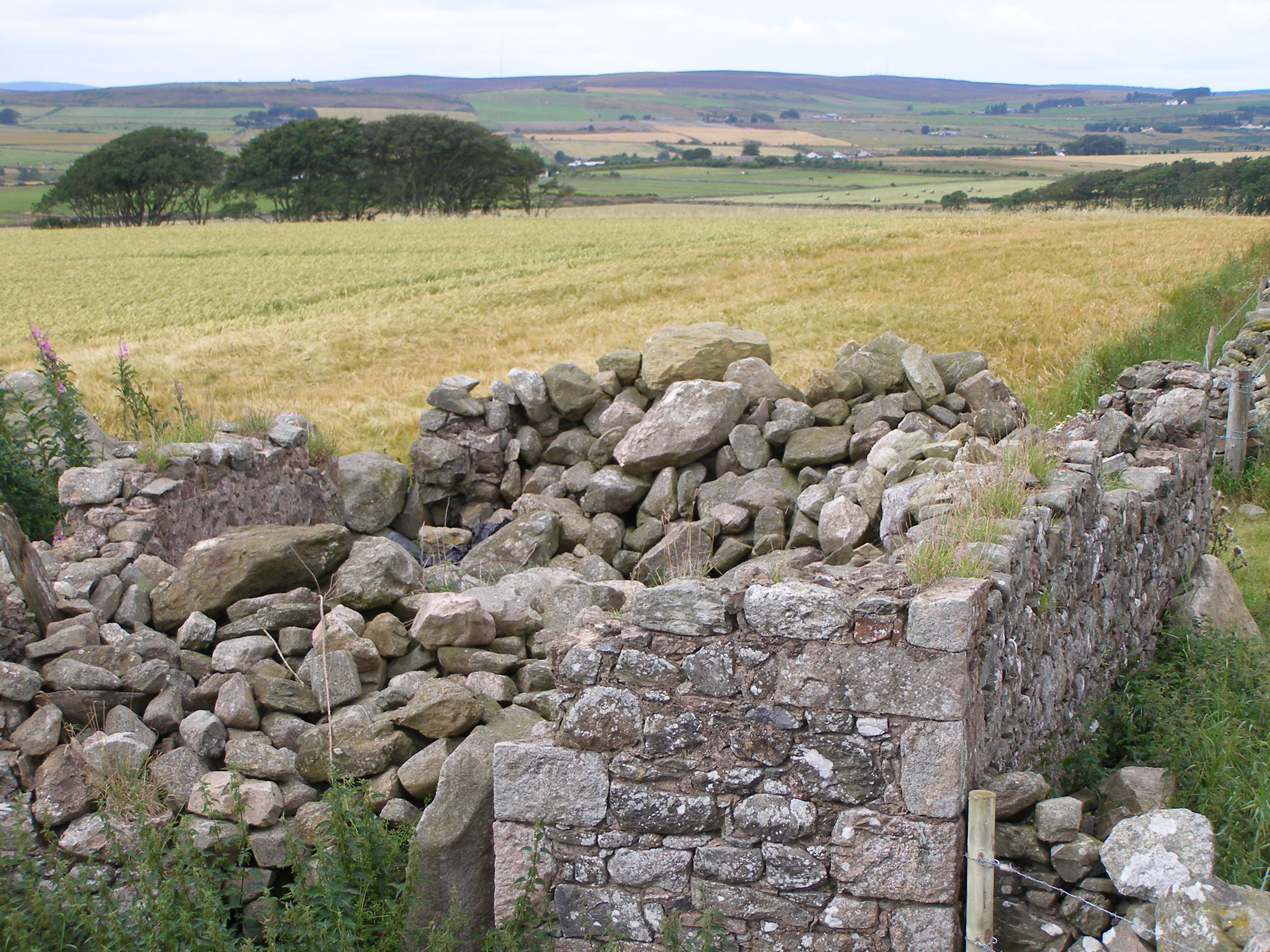
Ruined Episcopal chapel from 18th century where the clergymen conducted their services leading to imprisonment

The Stonehaven Tolbooth is thought to have been founded by George Keith, 5th Earl Marischal (c. 1553–1623), with the original purpose of the rectangular building being as a storehouse. An act of Parliament, the Stonehaven Act 1600 (c. 51 (S)) provided that the sheriff of Kincardine would sit and hold their courts at "Stanehyve".

After 1624, the town business functions were conducted on the upper level of the Stonehaven Tolbooth, with the ground floor being used as the prison.

By 1685, there are further accounts of the Stonehaven Tolbooth functioning as the seat of justice for all of Kincardineshire (the former shire of this district that was eventually subsumed into Aberdeenshire). Over the winter of 1748–1749, three Episcopalian clergy were incarcerated for the crime of holding a religious ceremony to more than nine people at the (now ruined) chapel situated on the estate grounds of nearby Muchalls Castle along the ancient Causey Mounth. The Episcopalians were associated with the Jacobite cause and discriminated against by the ruling Hanoverians. The imprisoned clergymen's plight was memorialised in a well known painting, illustrating a baptism of an infant through the bars of the prison. The painting belongs to the diocese at Brechin.

Episcopal services were held in the Tolbooth from 1709, when Dunnottar parish church became part of the Church of Scotland, until an Episcopal meeting house was erected in Stonehaven High Street in 1738.

=== Later history ===
When new county government facilities were built in Dunnottar Avenue in 1767, the Stonehaven tolbooth reverted to its earlier humble use as a storehouse. In 1963, the Tolbooth was in need of restoration, Queen Elizabeth The Queen Mother officially opened it in September 1963 which resulted in the present day use configuration of a local museum on the ground floor and a restaurant on the above level. The museum displays objects relating to local history and the Tolbooth's existence, including a wooden model of the local war memorial.

== Architecture ==
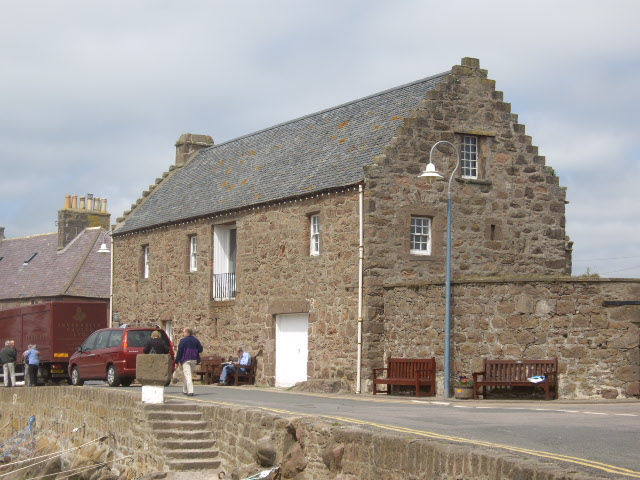
The Tolbooth

The original rectangular building was constructed with the long axis being east–west, with a length of 18.9 meters The construction is of Old Red Sandstone, a locally derived stone that was used in other local buildings of the same period such as Muchalls Castle. A 17th-century north wing was added nearly at right angles to the original block. The gables of the original rectangular block are crow-stepped, with a chimney on the west end.

== Interior features ==
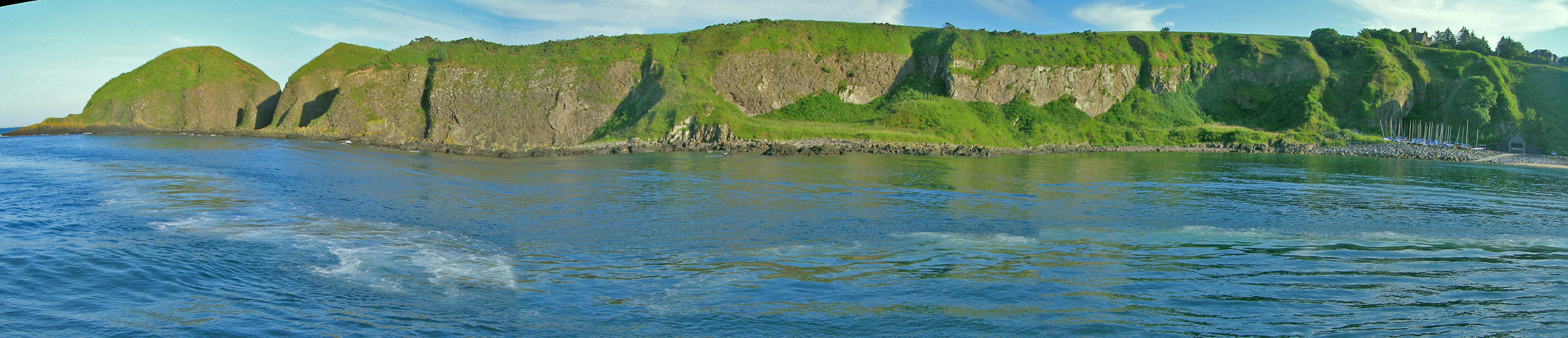
View of the southern part of Stonehaven Harbour from a point near the Tolbooth

The north block (17th-century addition) floor retains original flagstones and cobblestones dating to the original north block. There is also a sizable firepit along the west wall of the north block wing, although the associated chimney above has been filled, rendering the fireplace unusable. At the ground level a partial stone wall partition separates the two large chambers belonging to the 16th and 17th centuries. Arrow slits on the south facing 16th-century wall are original; however they have been filled in.

== See also ==
- Bellman's Head
- Carron Water
- Dunnottar Castle
- Fetteresso Castle
- Fowlsheugh
- Ury House
- List of Category A listed buildings in Aberdeenshire
- List of listed buildings in Stonehaven, Aberdeenshire
