= Red cloak =

Red cloak may refer to:

- Red Cloak, an industrial area in Scotland
- The Red Cloak, a 1955 film
- Redcloak, a character in the webcomic The Order of the Stick
- Aka Manto, a Japanese urban legend about a spirit who wears a red cloak
- Red Cloak (DJ), a Brazilian DJ and music producer
