= Carron Water, Aberdeenshire =

Carron Water
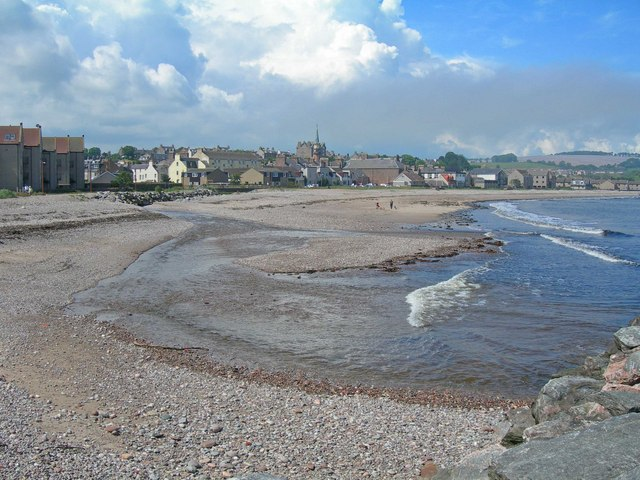
- Mouth of the Carron Water at Stonehaven
- Native name: Carrann (Scottish Gaelic)

Location
- Country: Scotland

Physical characteristics
- Source: Fetteresso Forest
- Mouth: North Sea
  - location: Stonehaven Bay, Scotland
  - coordinates: 56.96252°N 2.20602°W

The Carron Water is a river in Kincardineshire, Scotland.

== Geography ==
The Carron Water rises in Fetteresso Forest on the eastern edge of the Grampians. It flows past Fetteresso Castle and discharges into the North Sea at Stonehaven Bay. The river separates the Old Town from Stonehaven's new town (just over two hundred years of age), laid out in grid-iron fashion. Somewhat to the north is Garron Point, whilst Bellman's Head and Downie Point lie to the south. Historic features in the vicinity include the Stonehaven Tolbooth, Dunnottar Castle, and slightly further north, the Chapel of St. Mary and St. Nathalan and Muchalls Castle.

Stonehaven's other river at the north end of town is the Cowie Water.

== Flooding ==
The river has regularly overflowed, leading to flooding in Stonehaven. Flood defences were constructed in 2021.

== See also ==
- Bellman's Head
- Carron Restaurant Building
- Tewel
