= Tewel =

Coordinates: 56.9578°N 2.2805°W

- Location within Aberdeenshire
- OS grid reference: NO828854
- Council area: Aberdeenshire
- Lieutenancy area: Kincardineshire
- Country: Scotland
- Sovereign state: United Kingdom
- Post town: STONEHAVEN
- Postcode district: AB39
- Police: Scotland
- Fire: Scottish
- Ambulance: Scottish
- UK Parliament: West Aberdeenshire and Kincardine
- Scottish Parliament: Angus North and Mearns

Tewel is a hamlet located approximately two miles west of Stonehaven, Kincardineshire on the Auchenblae Road in Northeast Scotland.

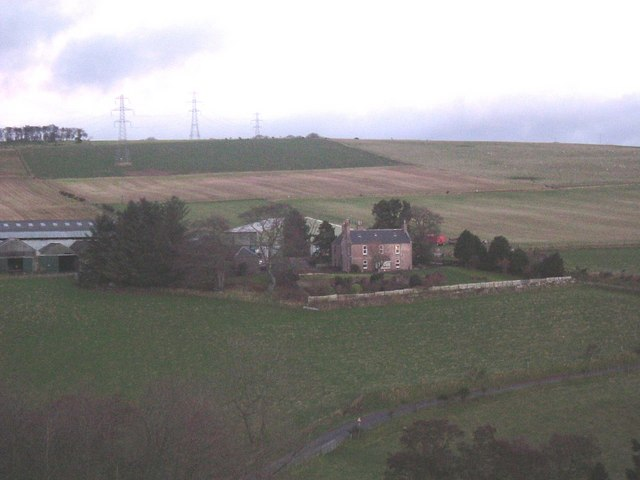
Tewel Farm

It consists of:

- Tewel Farm
- Tewel School and Schoolhouse
- Four semi detached houses
- One cottage (derelict)

== Nearby places of note ==
Significant historic listed buildings in the vicinity include: Fetteresso Castle, which is also the site of Bronze Age discoveries and Muchalls Castle, originally a 14th-century tower house. Also in the vicinity are the villages of Auchenblae and Drumlithie, both considered part of the original region of Kincardineshire.
