= Dunnottar Parish Church =

Church in the south of Aberdeenshire, Scotland

- Carronside Parish Church
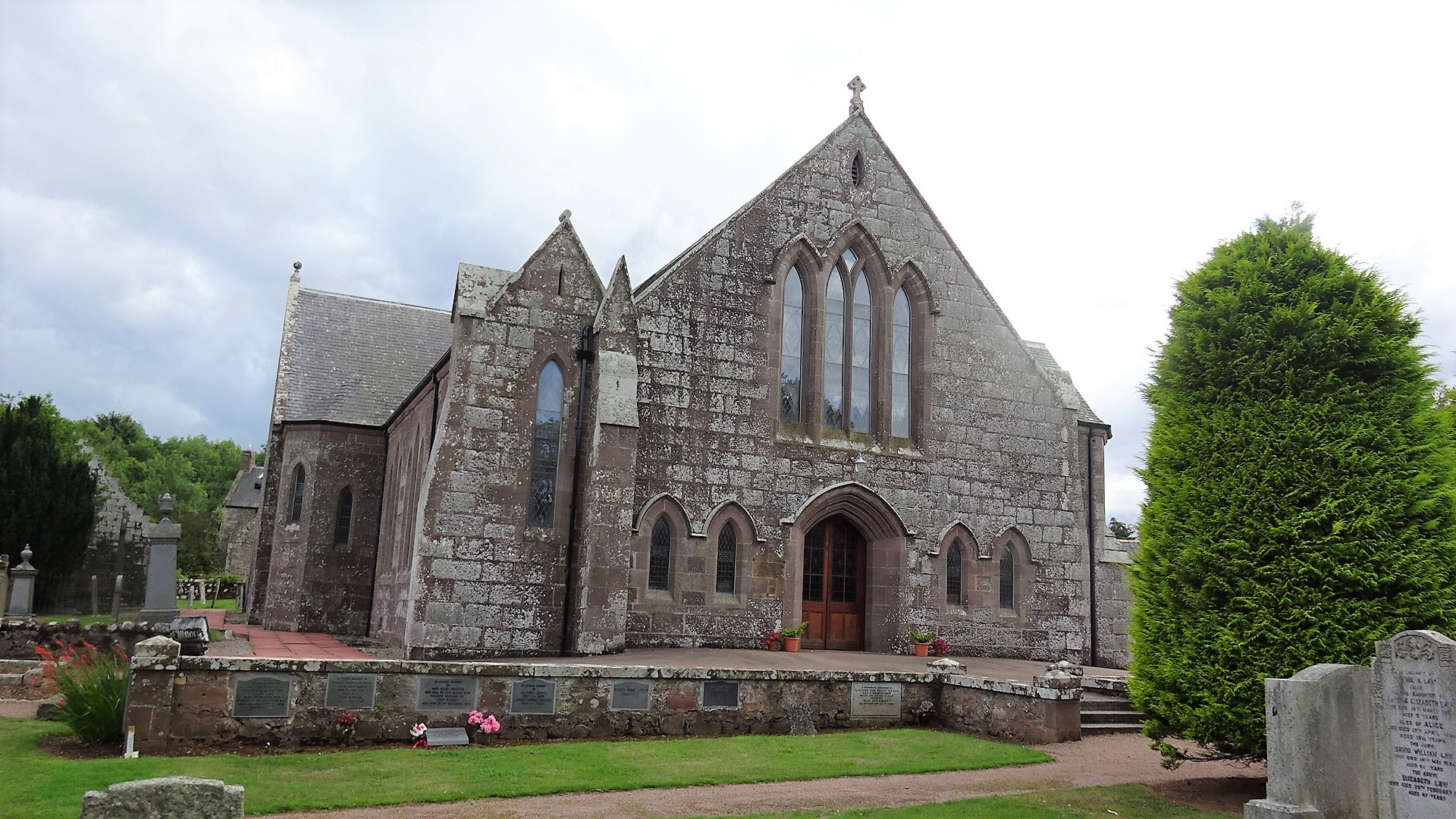
- Dunnottar Parish Church
- 56.9578°N 2.2270°W
- Denomination: Church of Scotland
- Churchmanship: Reformed
- Website: https://www.carronsidechurch.net/

Administration
- Parish: Carronside Church

Dunnottar Parish Church is a parish church of the Church of Scotland, serving Stonehaven in the south of Aberdeenshire, Scotland. It is within the Church of Scotland's Presbytery of Kincardine and Deeside. During 2020, the congregation united to the South Parish Church in Stonehaven to form Carronside Church of Scotland. On 3 June 2021, the Rev. Sarah Smith was inducted into the charge.

== Location ==
The church building is situated in Dunnottar woods, Stonehaven (within the AB39 postcode area), sitting high above the bank on the Carron water. It sits on the south-western periphery of Stonehaven, and is approximately a 20-minute walk from the Market Square in the centre of town. Dunnottar Castle stands approximately one and a half miles to the south-east of the church. The manse stands directly across the road to the west.

Dunnottar Parish also holds property including St Bridget's hall on Dunnottar Avenue, Stonehaven. The hall, which was built in 1887 and stands on the site of a previous church, was built to act as a missionary church to the Old Town, or 'Auld Toon', of Stonehaven. Historically morning services were held in Dunnottar Church, and evening services were held in St Bridget's. St Bridget's hall is now used for the Parish Evening Communion and meeting of the Church's organisations. It is also let out to community organisations.

In 2021, a footpath was created which crossed Toucks Burn (a tributary to the Carron Water, linking the church and the nearby Dunnottar Park housing development.

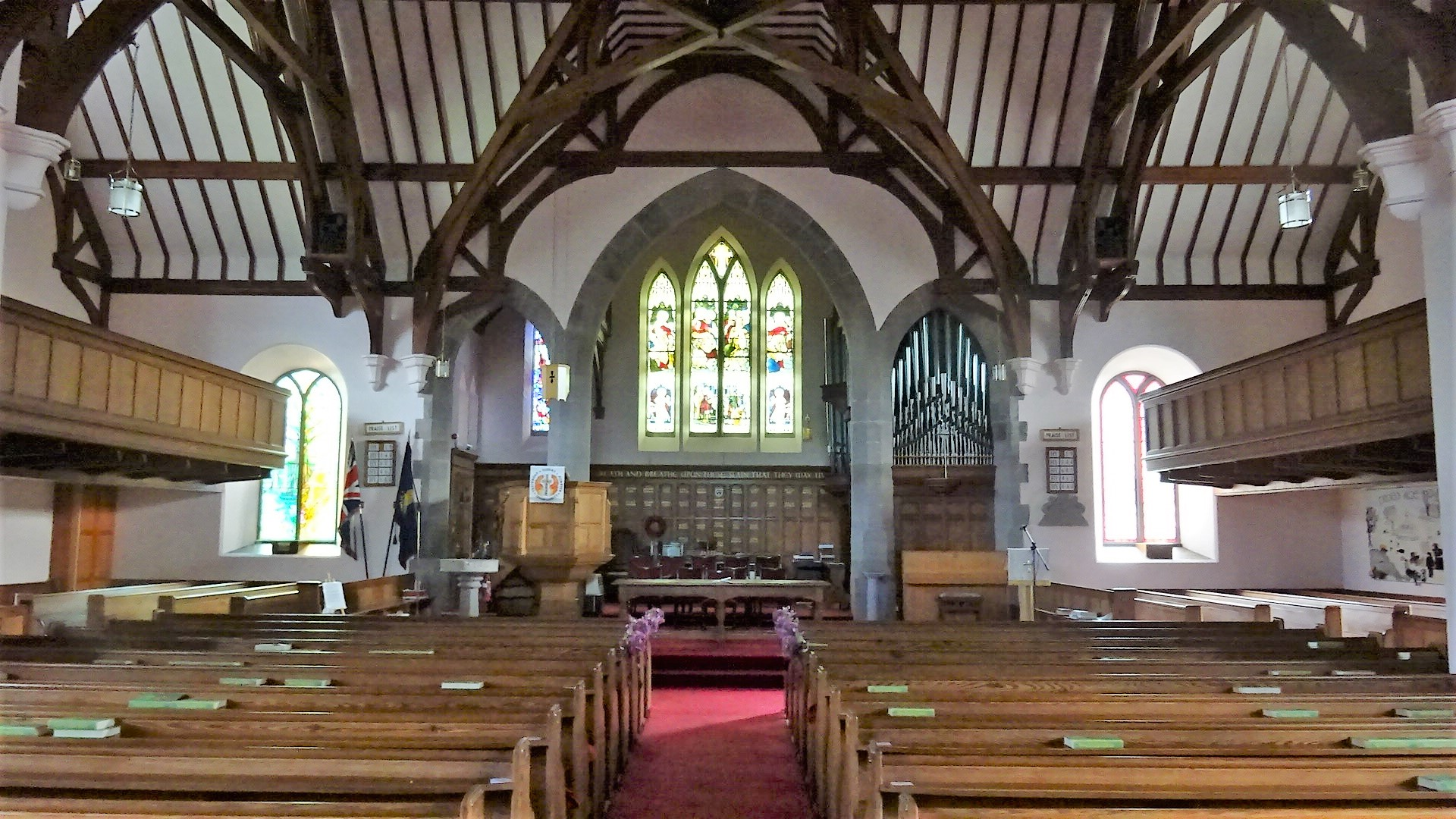
Church interior

== Buildings ==
The church, in its present location, was re-built in 1852 and later extended in 1869. It again underwent major reconstruction in 1903, which made it considerably larger when a nave and chancel were added, turning the previously rectangular building into a cruciform shape. The building recently underwent more renovations, this time to make it more accessible, and to include a multi-purpose activity room.

The churchbell was cast in 1793 by Andrew Lawson, the last of the Old Aberdeen founders; is supposed to be one of the best examples of his work. In his book Church bells of Kincardineshire, F.C. Eeles wrote:

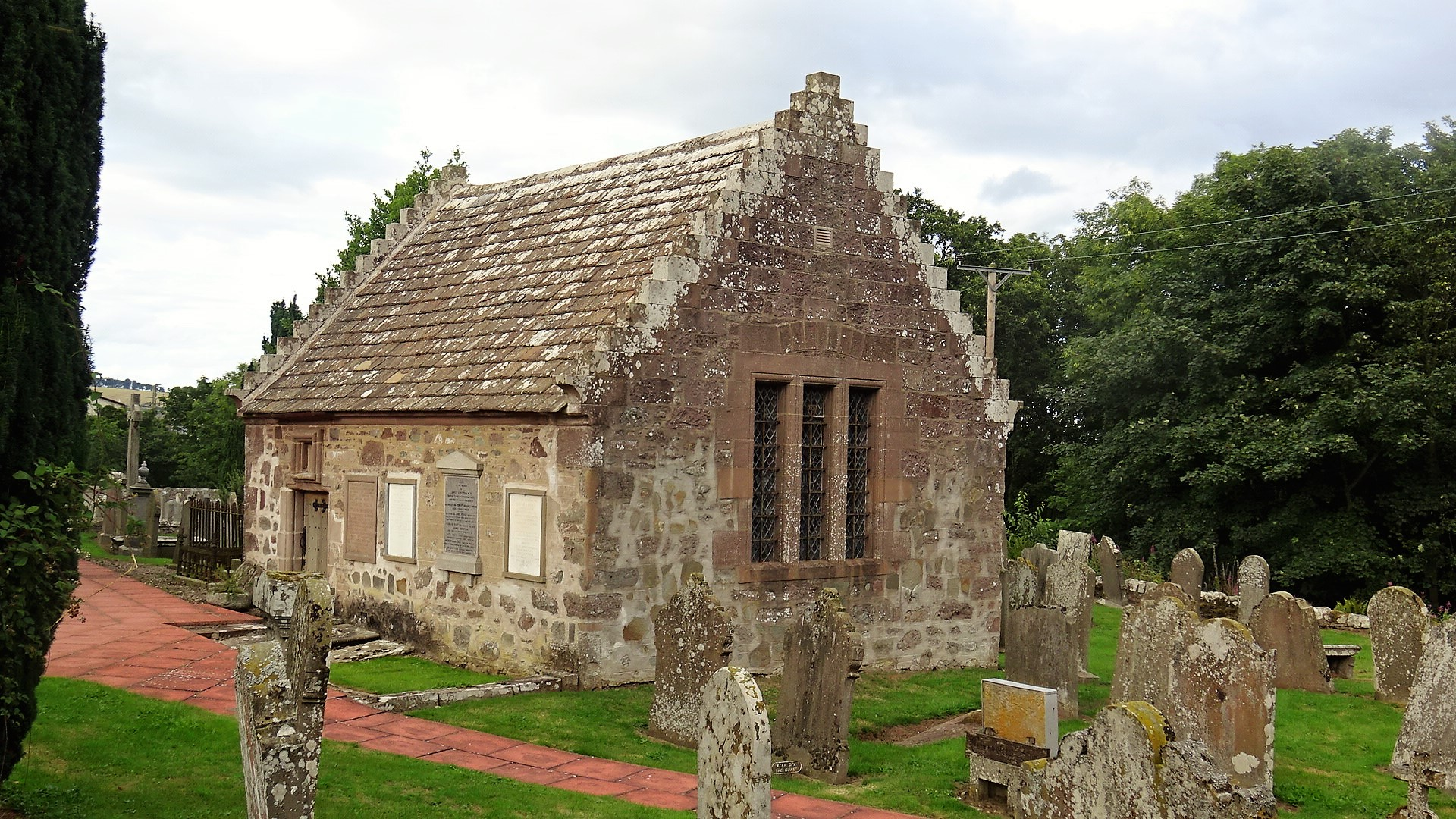
The Marischal Aisle

Insignificant though they are, those few fleur-de-lys used on the Dunnottar bell are perhaps one of the very latest survivals of the ecclesiastical art of the Middle Ages. This is perfectly possible because founders' stamps were handed on from one founder to another and in England there are several cases of the use of medieval stamps at the end of the 17th century. Moreover, in the foreign mouldings and outline of the Dunnottar bell, we see a lingering survival of that continental influence which ever since the English wars in the 14th century had held such sway in Scotland.

The Marischal Aisle (nowadays a mausoleum), sits in the current church grounds and was first built in 1582 by George Keith, the 5th Earl Marischal of Scotland and founder of Marischal College in Aberdeen.

== Covenanters Stone ==
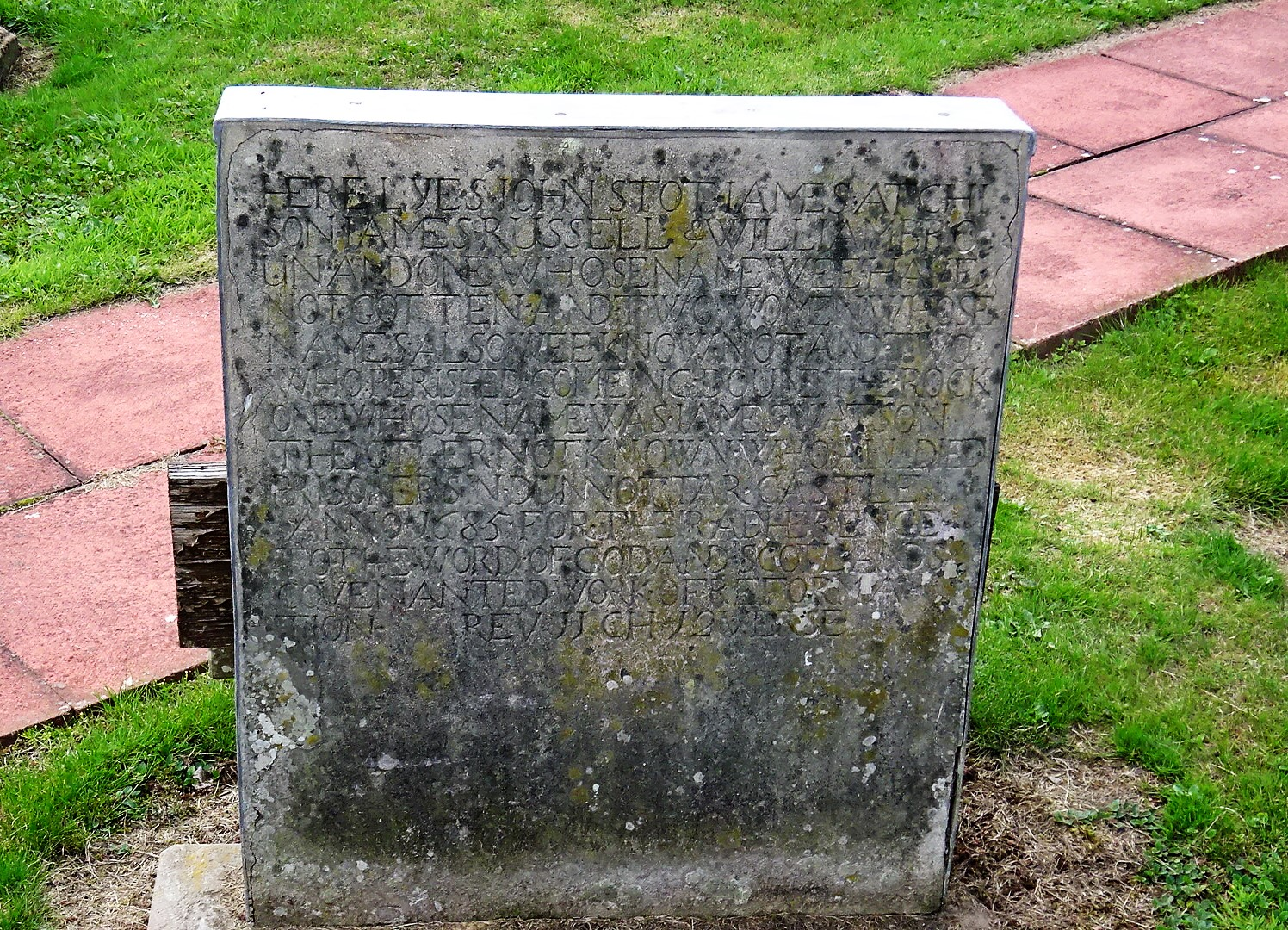
Covenanters memorial

One feature of the churchyard is the Covenanters Stone, a reminder of the Covenanters who were imprisoned in nearby Dunnottar Castle. This stone is said to have been the inspiration for Sir Walter Scott in his novel Old Mortality, whereby he watched Robert Patterson carefully and lovingly restore the lettering on the Covenanters Stone.

The stone reads:

HERE LYES JOHN STOT ATCHISON JAMES RUSSELL & WILLIAM BROUN AND ONE WHOSE NAME WEE HAVE NOT GOTTEN AND TWO WOMEN WHOSE NAMES ALSO WEE KNOW NOT AND TWO WHO PERISHED COMING DOUNE THE ROCK ONE WHOSE NAME WAS JAMES WATSON THE OTHER NOT KNOWN WHO ALL DIED PRISONERS IN DUNNOTTAR CASTLE ANNO 1685 FOR THEIR ADHERENCE TO THE WORD OF GOD AND SCOTLAND’S COVENANTED WORK OF REFORMATION REV CHAP 12 VERSE 11.

== See also ==
- List of Church of Scotland parishes
- Scottish Reformation
