= Chapel of St Mary and St Nathalan =

Ruined chapel in Aberdeenshire, Scotland

Coordinates: 56.9769°N 2.1920°W

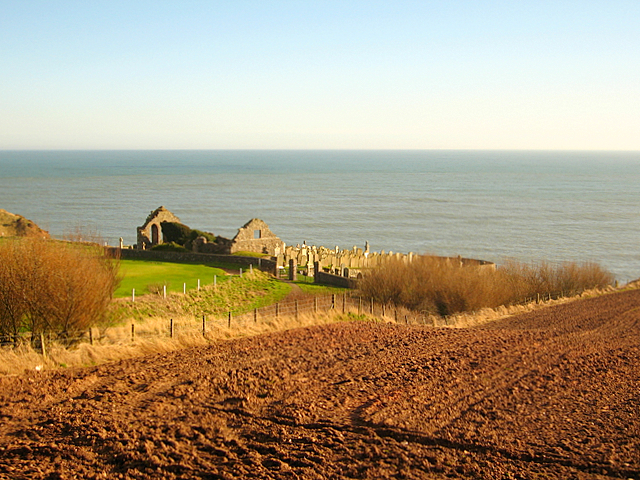
Cowie Chapel

The Chapel of St Mary and St Nathalan is a ruined chapel overlooking the North Sea immediately north of Stonehaven, in the Mearns of Scotland, along the northern shoreline of Stonehaven Bay. (Watt, 1985) The founding of this Christian place of worship is associated with Nathalan. who lived circa 650 AD. The structure is alternatively known as Cowie Chapel.

The chapel is at the point where the Highland Boundary Fault meets the sea and so is on the dividing line between the highlands and lowlands of Scotland.

== History ==
The chapel was consecrated by Bishop William Wishart of St Andrews on 22 May 1276.

It was important pilgrimage site, with King James VI in a letter of 1510 describing it as being "vistited by multitudes of the faithful." and that it the site of a "number of miracles,

The chapel was abandoned after the reformation.

== Area history ==
The Chapel of St Mary and St Nathalan is one of the oldest surviving structures in Kincardineshire. About one kilometre to the west is the ancient Causey Mounth trackway, which was constructed on high ground to make passable this only available medieval route from coastal points south of Stonehaven into Aberdeen. This route specifically connected the River Dee crossing (where the present Bridge of Dee is situated) via Muchalls Castle and Cowie Castle from the south. (Hogan, 2007) The route was that taken by Earl Marischal and the Marquess of Montrose when they led a Covenanter army of 9,000 men in the first battle of the Wars of the Three Kingdoms in 1639.

== See also ==
- Doonie Point
- Limpet Burn
- Red Cloak
