= Spurryhillock =

Spurryhillock is a Mesolithic archaeological site and modern industrial estate at Stonehaven, Aberdeenshire, Scotland. The area is bordered on its southern edge by the Dundee–Aberdeen line, and on its western edge by the A90.

A bus depot is situated here, opened in 1984 by Northern Scottish.

== See also ==
- Red Cloak
