= Stonehaven War Memorial =

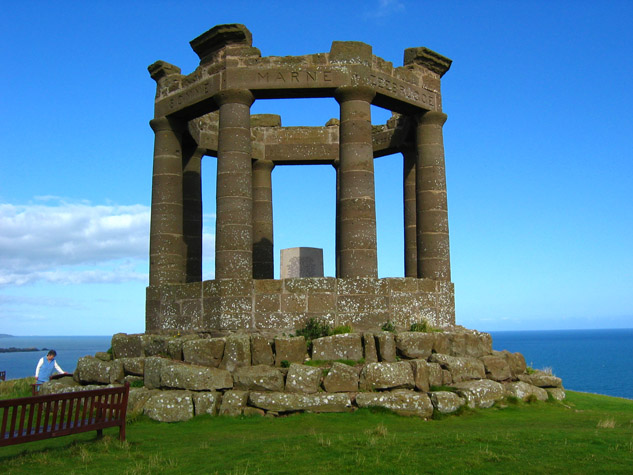
- Stonehaven War Memorial in 2008
- Interactive map of the Stonehaven War Memorial area

General information
- Coordinates: 56°57′17.92″N 2°12′9.61″W
- Completed: 1923

Design and construction
- Architect: John Ellis

Stonehaven War Memorial is a war memorial situated on Black Hill overlooking Stonehaven in Scotland.

== History ==
The memorial was designed by a Stonehaven architect, John Ellis. It was unveiled in May 1923 by Viscountess Cowdray.

On 20 May 2023, a rededication ceremony was held to mark 100 years since the structure was unveiled.

== Structure ==
The structure is octagonal and resembles a ruined temple. It is Category C listed.

Within the structure is a granite stone with the names of 162 people who died in World War I. After World War II, additional smaller memorial stones were added.
