= Ury House =

Ruined mansion in Aberdeenshire, Scotland

Coordinates: 56.9804°N 2.2328°W

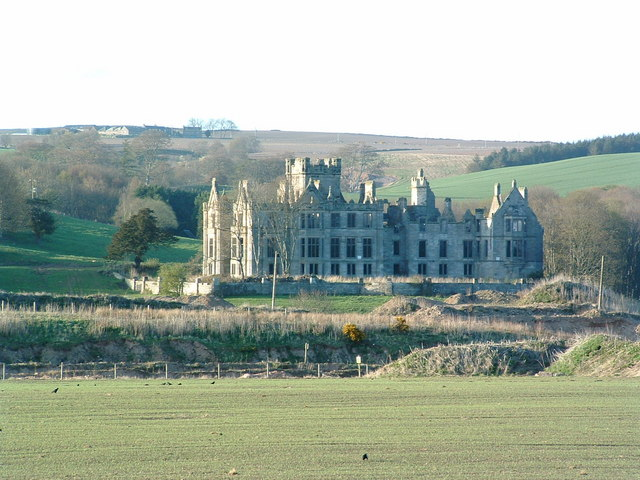
Ury House viewed across the Cowie Water

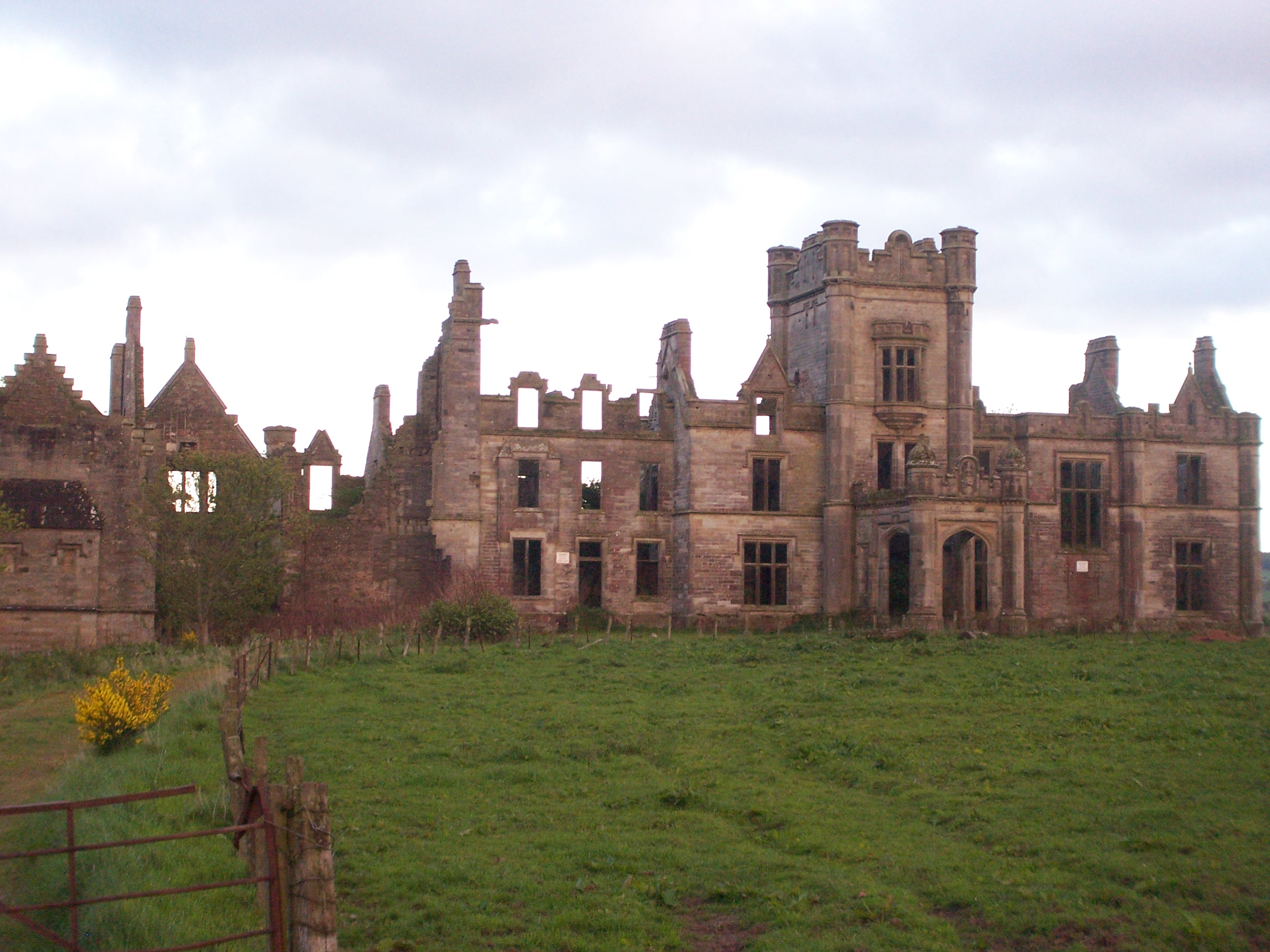
The ruinous main front of Ury House.

Ury House is a large ruined mansion in Aberdeenshire, Scotland, built in the Elizabethan style in 1885 by Sir Alexander Baird, 1st Baronet. It is situated on the north-east coast about 1 mile (1.6 km) north of Stonehaven in the former county of Kincardineshire.

== Prehistory ==
Bronze Age cist graves have been found at the site of the Ury House. Roman legions marched from Raedykes to Normandykes Roman Camp nearby as they used higher ground evading the bogs of Red Moss and low-lying mosses associated with the Burn of Muchalls. That march used the Elsick Mounth, one of the ancient trackways crossing the Mounth of the Grampian Mountains, lying west of Netherley.

== History ==
Originally the estate belonged to the Frasers, then the Hays starting in 1413, but eventually became the property of the Earl Marischal.

Colonel David Barclay purchased Urie in a lengthy process in the late 1660s, and his descendants owned it through 1854 when the estate was purchased by the Baird family (source Clan Barclay and newspaper archives Stonehaven). The second laird was his son, Robert Barclay, the Quaker apologist. It descended to Robert Barclay Allardice (MP) (1732-1797) and then to his son Captain Robert Barclay Allardice, known as “the celebrated pedestrian”.

Over the years Ury has been rebuilt three times.

In early times the property was known as Urie. In the 17th century, Ury was established as the north-east Scotland headquarters of the Quaker organisation by David Barclay.

== Current status ==
Today the house is derelict and the dangerous condition of the structure limits entry. In March 2007, FM Developments lodged an amended planning application for a golf and leisure complex on the estate as the previous housing development was rejected in October 2006. There have been earlier proposals for its restoration, including a 2004 planning application, which was rejected by the local Community Council.

The estate is now owned by The FM Group who have recently lodged a planning application to Aberdeenshire Council for the creation of a world-class 18-hole Jack Nicklaus Signature Championship Golf Course as part of the redevelopment of Ury Estate. In early 2019, plans for a housing development in the grounds (3 houses and 58 three-storey flats) were approved by Aberdeenshire Council along with the conversion of Ury House into a hotel.

== Nearby historic features ==
There are several notable historic structures and sites close to the Ury House, including:

- Fetteresso Castle
- Muchalls Castle
- Raedykes Roman Camp
- Rickarton House

== Natural features ==
Ury Estate is bounded on the west by Fetteresso Forest. Within about 150 metres south of Ury House is the confluence of the Burn of Monboys into the Cowie Water. Cowie Water has generally alkaline pH as tested at the perimeter of the Ury Estate, although its pH is somewhat lower above the confluence with the Burn of Monboys, explained by Lumina Tech as due to more acidic drainage from upland moorland peat areas in the Burn of Monboys watershed.

== See also ==
- Kirkton of Fetteresso
- William Rickart Hepburn
- Jack Nicklaus
