= Bellman's Head =

Headland in Stonehaven, Scotland

- Headland
- Location within Scotland
- Coordinates: 56.9607°N 2.2008°W
- Grid position: NO 87887 85513

Bellman's Head is a headland point comprising the northern boundary of Stonehaven Bay in Stonehaven, Scotland. The corresponding headland at the south of the bay is Downie Point.

== See also ==
- Fowlsheugh
