= Stonehaven Bay =

Natural harbour in Aberdeenshire, Scotland

Coordinates: 56°58′N 2°12′W

Stonehaven Bay is a natural harbour in Aberdeenshire, Scotland. The town of Stonehaven is built along the shore of Stonehaven Bay. The mouths of the Carron Water and the Cowie Water are both situated in Stonehaven, within the Bay.
