= Red Cloak =

Industrial area in Scotland

Coordinates: 56.965°N 2.232°W

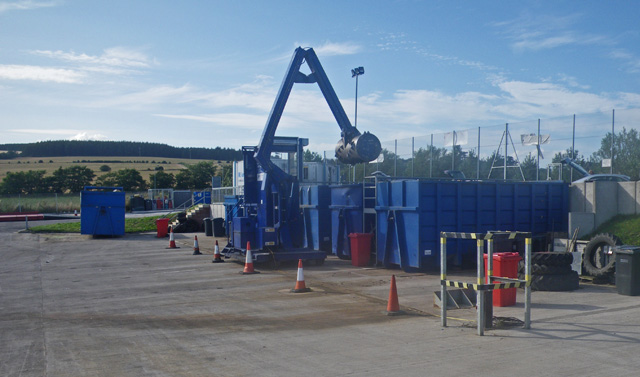
The recycling centre at Red Cloak

Red Cloak now known as Redcloak is an industrial area of Stonehaven, Aberdeenshire, Scotland. The site's settlement history is associated with events at the nearby Chapel of St. Mary and St. Nathalan. In current times Redcloak is primarily an industrial dominated land use that includes Aberdeenshire Council recycling and refuse disposal functions. Earliest area prehistory is evidenced by Bronze Age finds at Fetteresso Castle and Ury House.

== See also ==
- Ury House
- Muchalls Castle
- Raedykes
