= Fetteresso Castle =

Scottish estate

Coordinates: 56.9604°N 2.2604°W

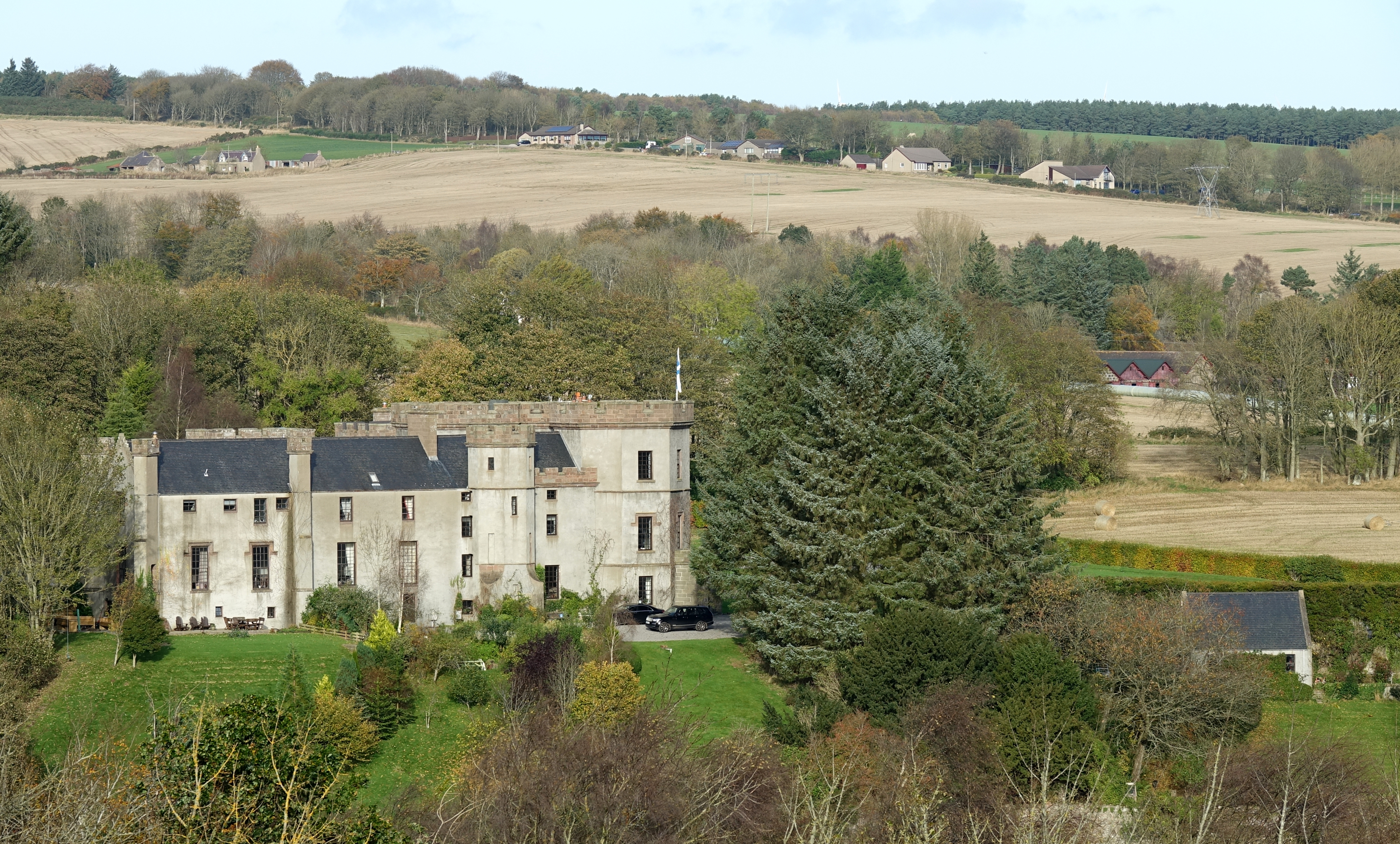
- The castle in 2021
- Interactive map of Fetteresso Castle

Fetteresso Castle is a 14th-century tower house, rebuilt in 1761 as a Scottish Gothic style Palladian manor, with clear evidence of prehistoric use of the site. It is situated immediately west of the town of Stonehaven in Kincardineshire, slightly to the west of the A90 dual carriageway. Other notable historic fortified houses or castles in this region are Dunnottar Castle, Muchalls Castle, Fiddes Castle, Cowie Castle and Monboddo House.

== Prehistory ==
From cropmarks in the "policies" (improved areas) around Fetteresso Castle, there is evidence of a ring ditch sited at the north end of a cursus. A cursus is a prehistoric set of parallel linear structures of unknown purpose that were, somewhat fancifully, considered by antiquarians as used for some type of athletic competition, possibly related to hunting or archery; this is unsubstantiated. In 1822 a cairn was discovered near Fetteresso Castle with some human remains inside. The size and shape of the chamber made of unhewn whinstone clearly show that the burial site was a Bronze Age construct. Some legends say that this is the grave of Malcolm I, who is recorded to have been slain at Fetteresso in AD 954. The burial hillock has become known as Malcolm's Mount, even though it is not likely from current archaeological analysis that the crypt could be so recent. In 1998 a burial urn from the Beaker people was found at Fetteresso Castle. The Roman Camp of Raedykes is located several miles north-west, where a full legion encamped and many archaeological recoveries have been made. This location is one of a string of marching camps that connected Angus to Moray.

== Middle Ages ==
The property is recorded to have been owned by the Strachans.

Robert de Bruce opposed the Balliol (and later the Comyn) claim to the throne of Scotland, which culminated at the Battle of Barra Hill (1308). Castlehill of Strachan was in fact burned out by Robert de Bruce, and the Barony of Strachan later disinherited from the de Strachan family and granted by Robert de Bruce to Sir Alexander Fraser in c. 1316 (Robertson Index, 1-15). The Strachan family were supporters and kinsmen of John Comyn, Earl of Buchan.

The barony of Fetteresso eventually passed to William Keith, the Earl Marischal of Scotland, who inherited the barony through his mother, the daughter of Sir Alexander Fraser, in the 14th century. The Clan Keith Earls Marischal built the tower house. The Earls Marischal also held the nearby fortress, Dunnottar Castle. James VI hunted in the woods at Fetteresso on 20 June 1580 while staying at Dunnotar.

== 17th and 18th centuries ==
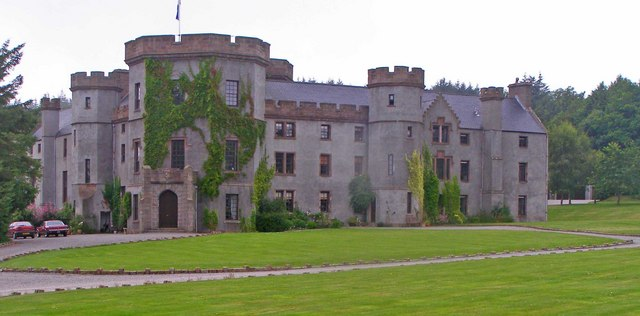
The castle in 2006

The characteristic Scottish designs of crow-stepped gables and the battlement crenellation elements were introduced. A dovecote of considerable height was constructed in the 17th century to the south of the castle. In 1659 Jean Hunter lived at Fetteresso. She was accused of witchcraft and hanged at her home. An artist and wright named Alexander Charles worked at Fetteresso as an overseer. Charles flourished from 1671 to 1678 and published his drawings in at least one book. Late in the 17th century, the Duff family controlled Fetteresso and expanded the building around the old tower house.

== 20th and 21st centuries ==
In the 1940s, the castle was owned by Maurice Simpson and Geraldine Simpson (née Pringle). She was the heiress to the Pringle knitware fortune. Subsequently, the Simpsons acquired and lived in nearby Muchalls Castle. After the Simpsons' tenure at Fetteresso, the roof was off the castle for some period starting around 1954, and the castle was bought by a local landowner and then left to the Don family in his will. In the latter part of the 20th century, the castle was restored and sub-divided into seven houses, which is its present use. Ms Simpson continued to reside in the local area until her death in 2010.

== Recent years ==
In 2020, a residential unit within Fetteresso Castle (known as Number Seven) was placed on the market.

== See also ==
- Allardice Castle
- Kirkton of Fetteresso
- Red Cloak
- Stonehaven Tolbooth
- Ury House

== Bibliography ==
- C. Michael Hogan. 2008. Fetteresso Fieldnotes, The Modern Antiquarian
- Benjamin T. Hudson, Prophecy of Berchan: Irish and Scottish Kings of the Early Middle Ages, (1996) ISBN 0-313-29567-0
- Scottish Notes and Queries 1899-1900, edited by John Bullock, A. Brown and Company, Aberdeen
- Historical Geography of the Clans of Scotland
- Primitive Beliefs in the Northeast of Scotland
