= Stonehaven =

Town in Aberdeenshire, Scotland

Coordinates: 56.964°N 2.211°W

Stonehaven: Scottish Gaelic: Cala na Creige; Scots: Steenhive
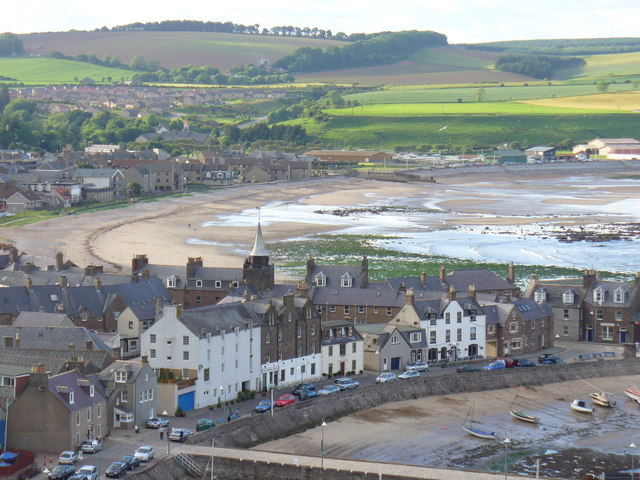
- Overview of Stonehaven

- Location within Aberdeenshire
- Population: 11,177 (2022)
- OS grid reference: NO8786
  - Edinburgh: 79 mi (127 km)
  - London: 386 mi (621 km)
- Council area: Aberdeenshire
- Lieutenancy area: Kincardineshire
- Country: Scotland
- Sovereign state: United Kingdom
- Post town: STONEHAVEN
- Postcode district: AB39
- Dialling code: 01569
- Police: Scotland
- Fire: Scottish
- Ambulance: Scottish
- UK Parliament: West Aberdeenshire and Kincardine
- Scottish Parliament: Angus North and Mearns

Stonehaven (/stoʊnˈheɪvən/ stohn-HAY-vən) is a coastal town on the northeast coast of Scotland, 15 miles (24 km) south of Aberdeen. The town had a population of 11,177 at the 2022 Census.

Stonehaven is known in the local Doric dialect as Steenhive (Scots pronunciation: [stinˈhɑev]) and is nicknamed Stoney. It was formerly the county town of Kincardineshire, succeeding the now abandoned town of Kincardine. It is currently administered as part of Aberdeenshire.

== Pre-history and archaeology ==
Stonehaven is the site of prehistoric events evidenced by finds at Fetteresso Castle and Neolithic pottery excavations from the Spurryhillock area. In 2004, archaeological work by CFA Archaeology, in advance of the building of the Aberdeen to Lochside Natural Gas Pipeline, found two short cists burials containing cremated remains to the southwest of Stonehaven. Radiocarbon dating put the burials in the first half of the 2nd millennium BC, which was the Early Bronze Age in Scotland. The burials contained stone tool artifacts and shale/cannel coal beads. That same year, researchers at the National Museums of Scotland and Yale University announced that a fossil found by an amateur paleontologist the previous year was the earliest known fossil of a land-dwelling animal. The fossil was about 420 million years old.

== History ==
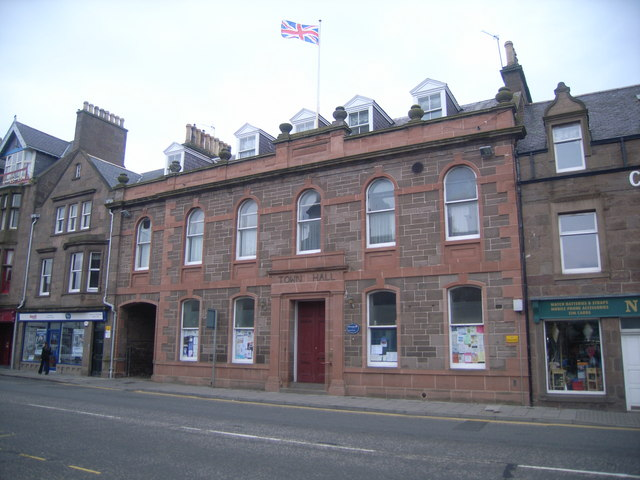
Stonehaven Town Hall

The town lies at the southern origin of the ancient Causey Mounth trackway, which was built on high ground to make passable this only available medieval route from coastal points south of Aberdeen. This ancient passage specifically connected the Bridge of Dee to Cowie Castle via the Portlethen Moss and the Stonehaven central plaza. The route was taken by the Earl Marischal and Marquess of Montrose when they led a Covenanter army of over 9,000 men in the first battle of the Wars of the Three Kingdoms in 1639.

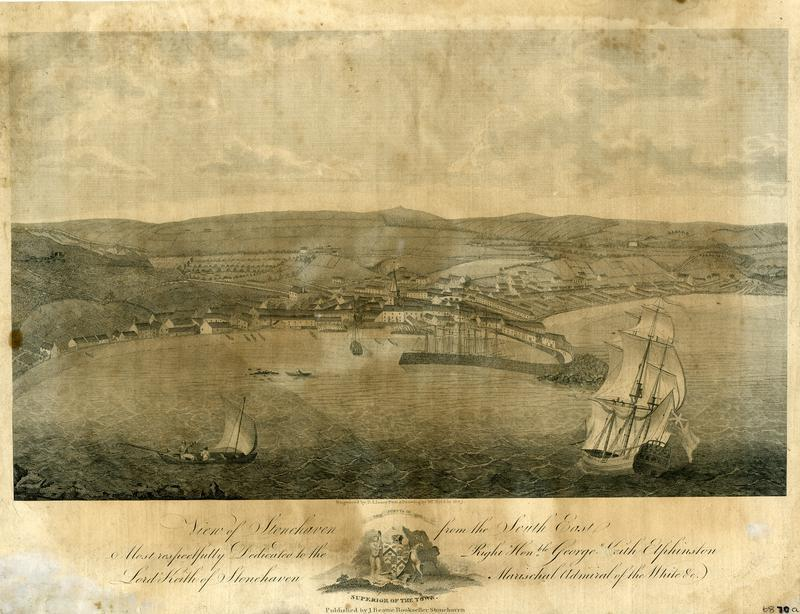
View of Stonehaven from the South East

The Covenanters were imprisoned in Dunnottar Castle, where many died. A memorial to them can be found in Dunnottar Church. Other castles in the vicinity are Fetteresso Castle and Muchalls Castle, both of which are in private ownership and not open to the public. The oldest surviving structure in Stonehaven is the Stonehaven Tolbooth at the harbour, used as an early prison and now a museum.

Dunnottar Castle, perched atop a rocky outcrop, was home to the Keith family, and during the Scottish Wars of Independence, the Scottish Crown Jewels were hidden there. In 1296 King Edward I of England took the castle, only for William Wallace to reclaim it in 1297, burning down the church in the process with the entire English garrison still in it. In 1650, Oliver Cromwell sacked the castle to find the Crown Jewels following an eight-month siege (having previously destroyed the English Crown Jewels). However, just before the castle fell, the Crown Jewels were smuggled out by some ladies who took them by boat to a small church just down the coast in the village of Kinneff, where they remained undetected for eleven years.

Stonehaven was a Jacobite town in the Fifteen and it was a safe base for the retreating Jacobite army to stay overnight on the night of 5–6 February 1716. In the Forty-Five Stonehaven, part of the Episcopalian north-east, was again ‘reliably Jacobite’ and it was one of the north-eastern ports where reinforcements, plus money and equipment were periodically landed from France. After 1709, when Dunnottar Parish Church was taken over by the Church of Scotland Episcopalian services were held in the tolbooth until a meeting house was built in the High Street in 1738. Following the failure of the Forty-Five, the Duke of Cumberland ordered the building to be demolished. Services were then held in a house on the High Street. Stonehaven Town Hall, which is an events venue in the town, was completed in 1878.

Near the Cowie Bridge, at the north of Stonehaven, was a fishing village known as Cowie, which has now been subsumed into Stonehaven. Somewhat further north are the ruins of Cowie Castle. Slightly to the west of Stonehaven is the ruined Ury House, originally a property of the Frasers.

In 1906 the new breakwater was nearing completion, and in the Annual Report of the Fishery Board for Scotland the hope was expressed that it would encourage the fishermen to acquire steam drifters. The Second Edition Six inch Ordnance Survey Map of Stonehaven shows the town at about this time, including the breakwater. Unfortunately, as the statistics show, the decline of the town as a fishing port continued.

Fishery Statistics

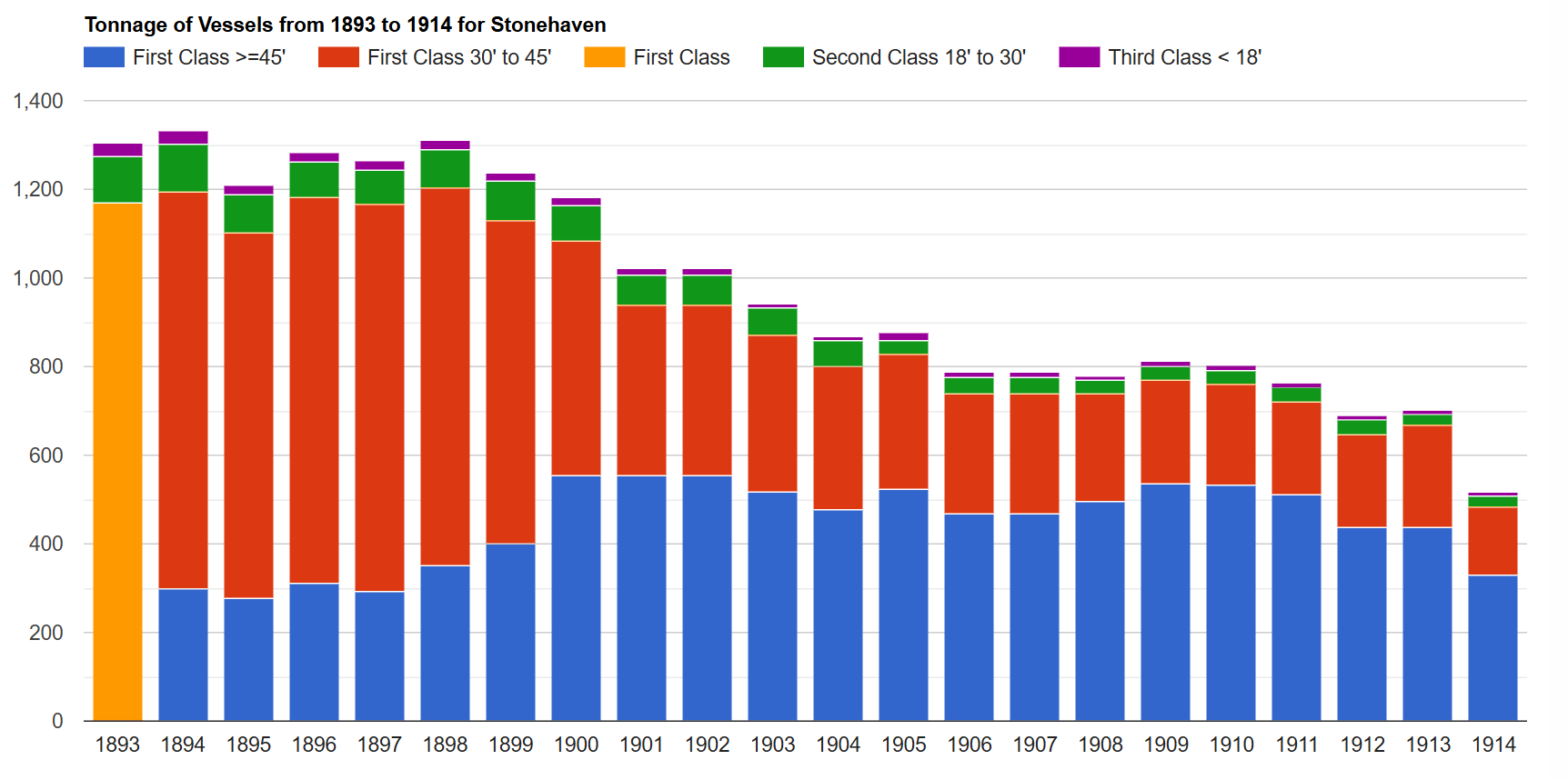
Tonnage of vessels

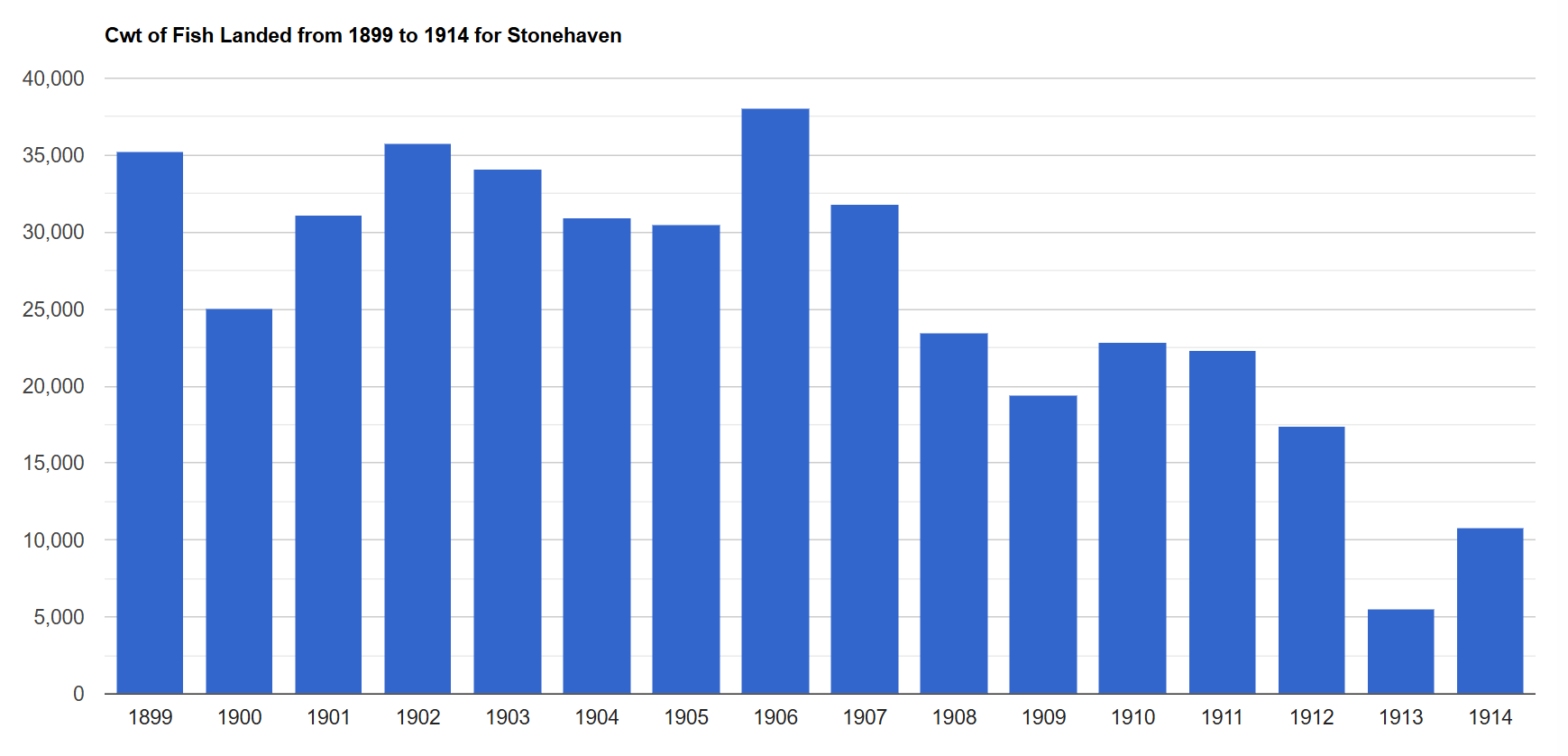
Cwt of fish landed

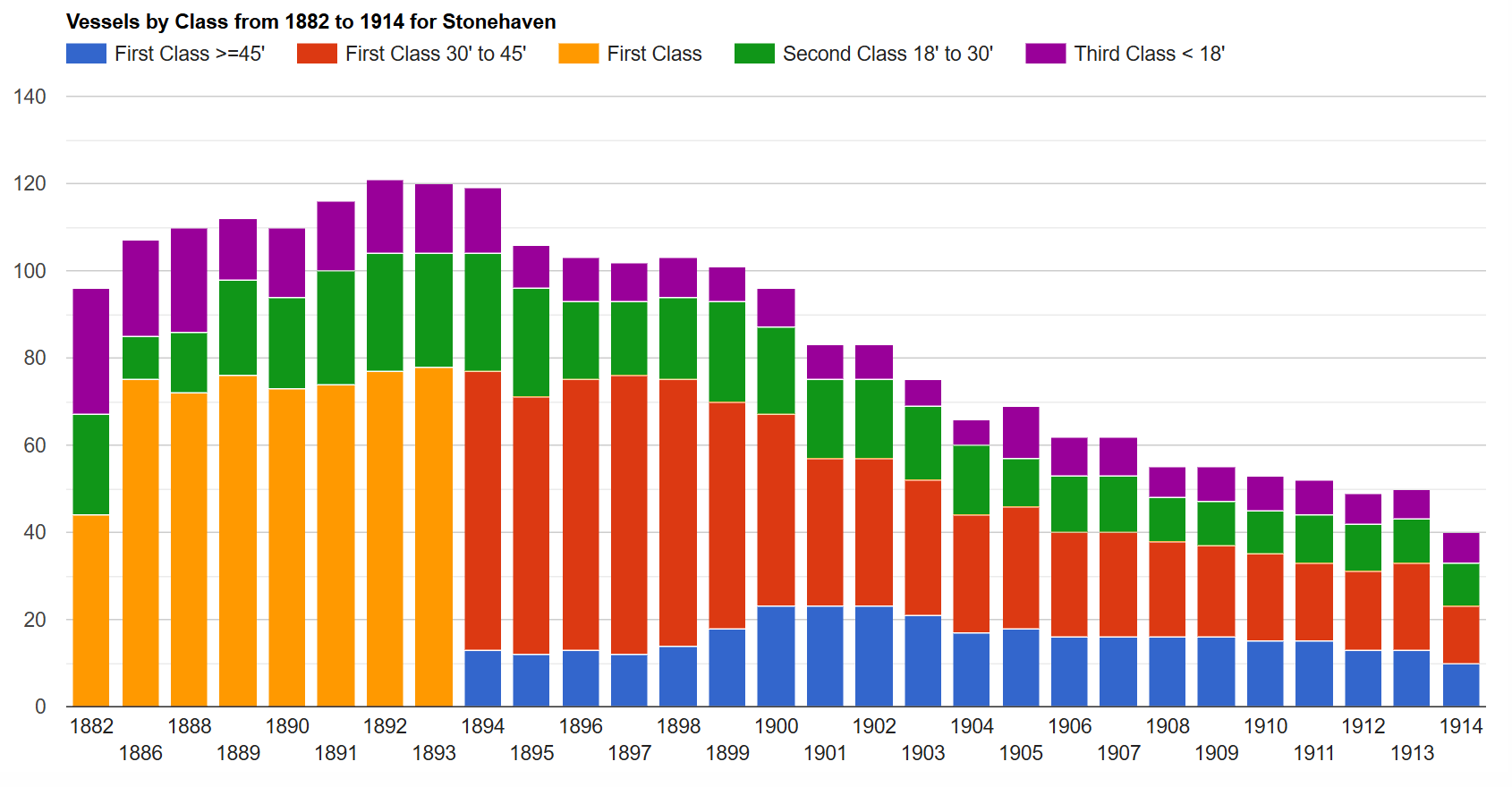
Vessels by class

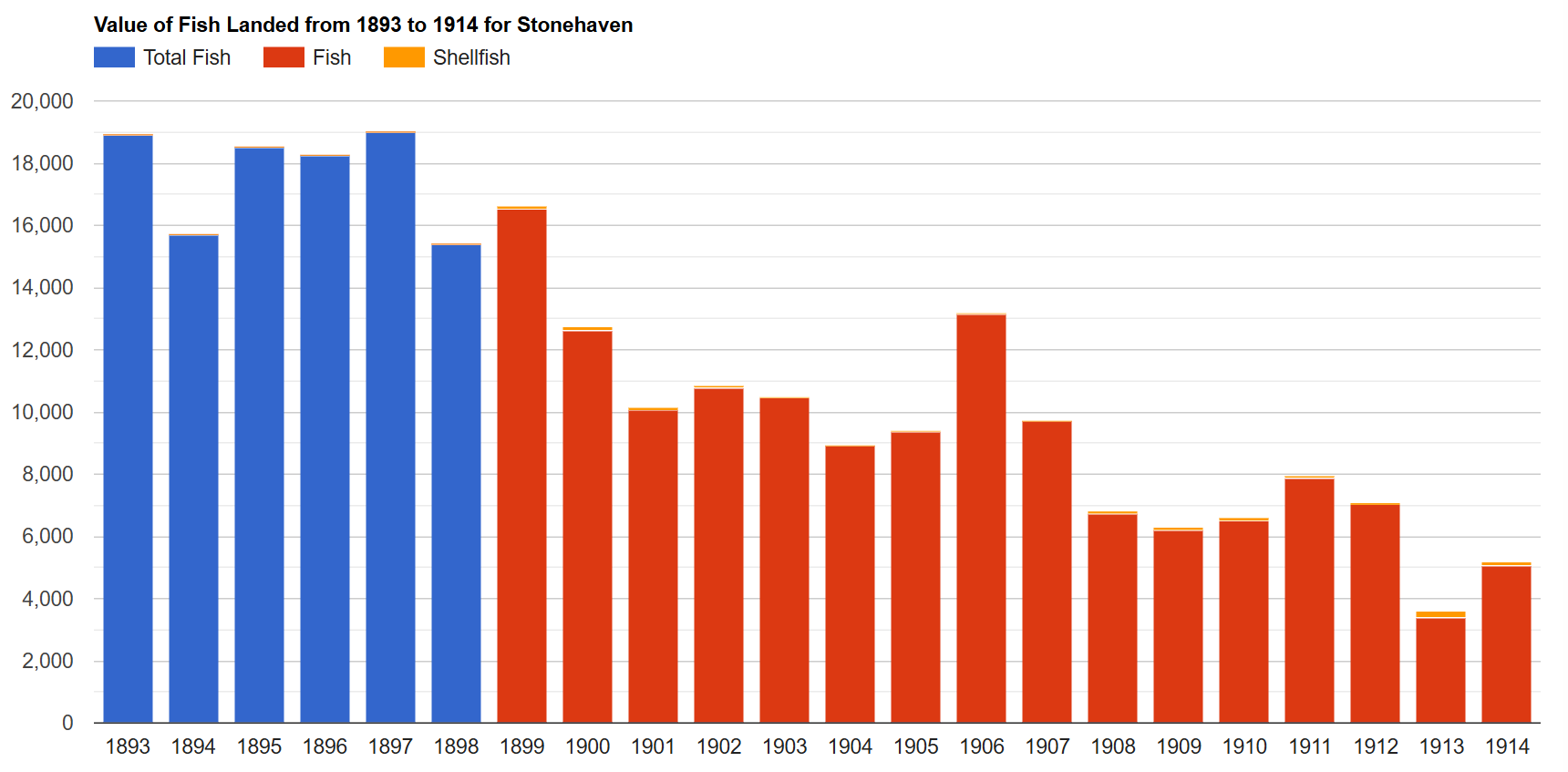
Value (£] of fish landed

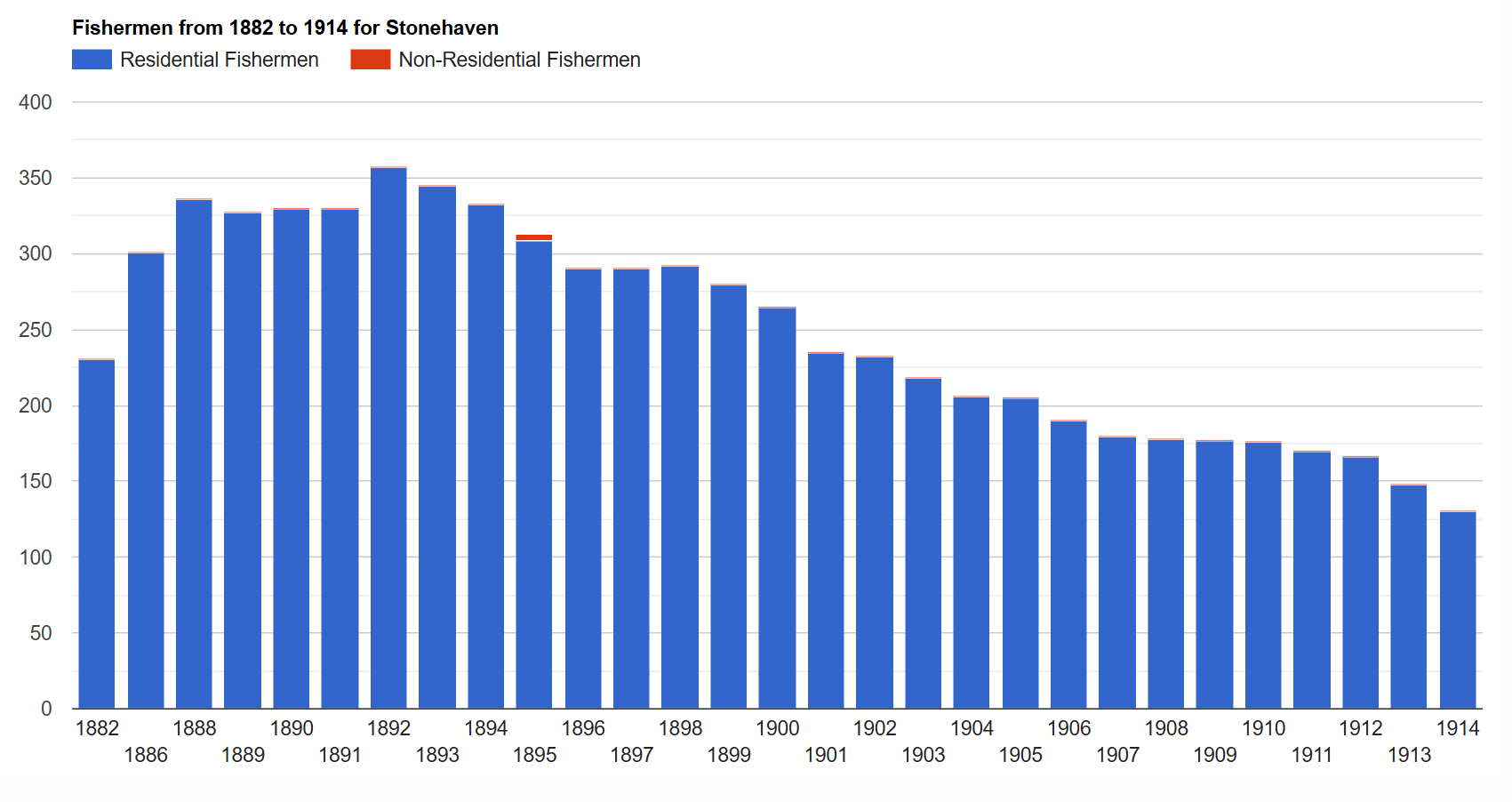
Fishermen

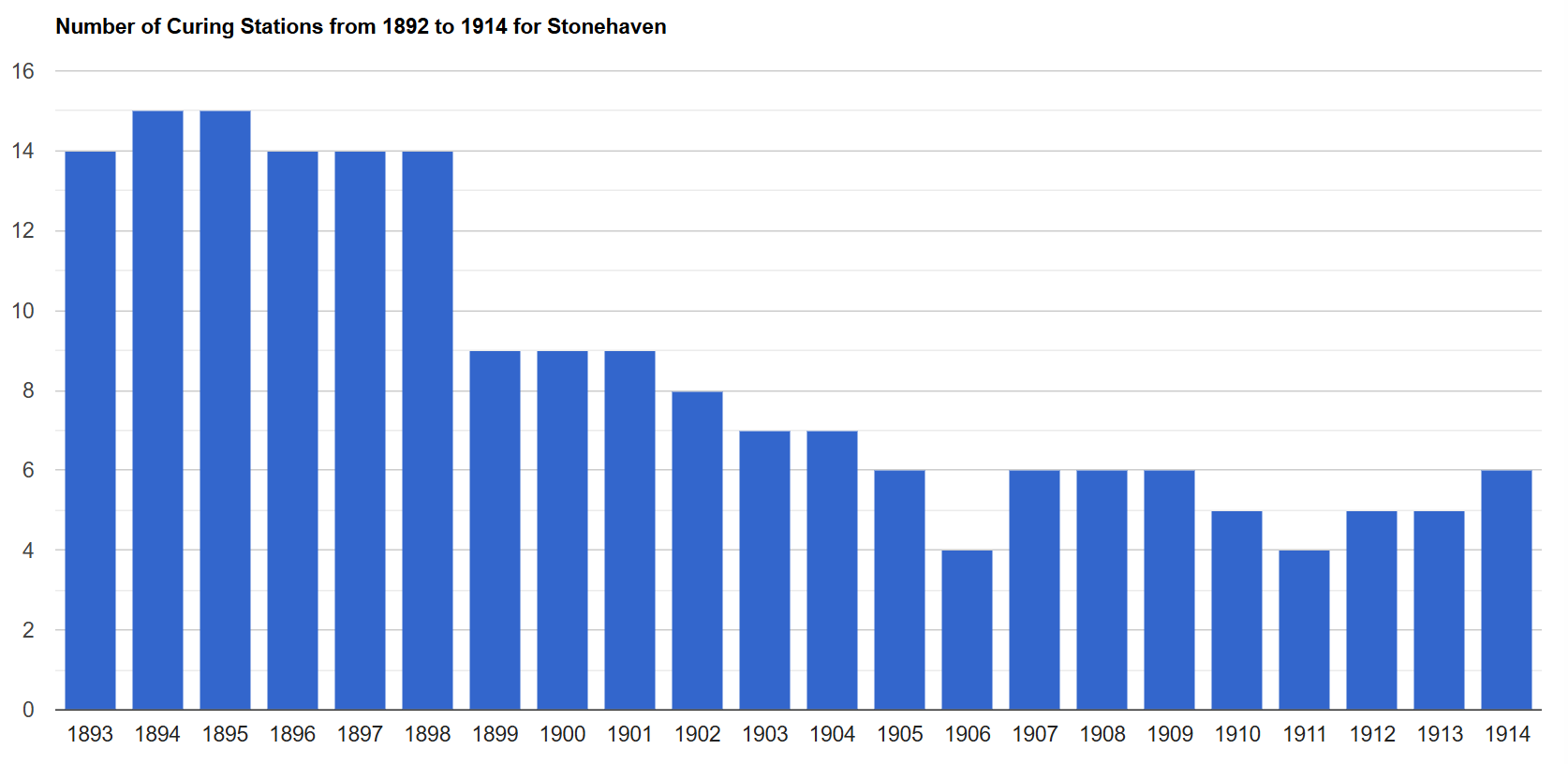
Number of curing stations

A fossil of the oldest known land animal, Pneumodesmus newmani, a species of millipede, was found at Stonehaven's Cowie Beach in 2004.

== Geography ==
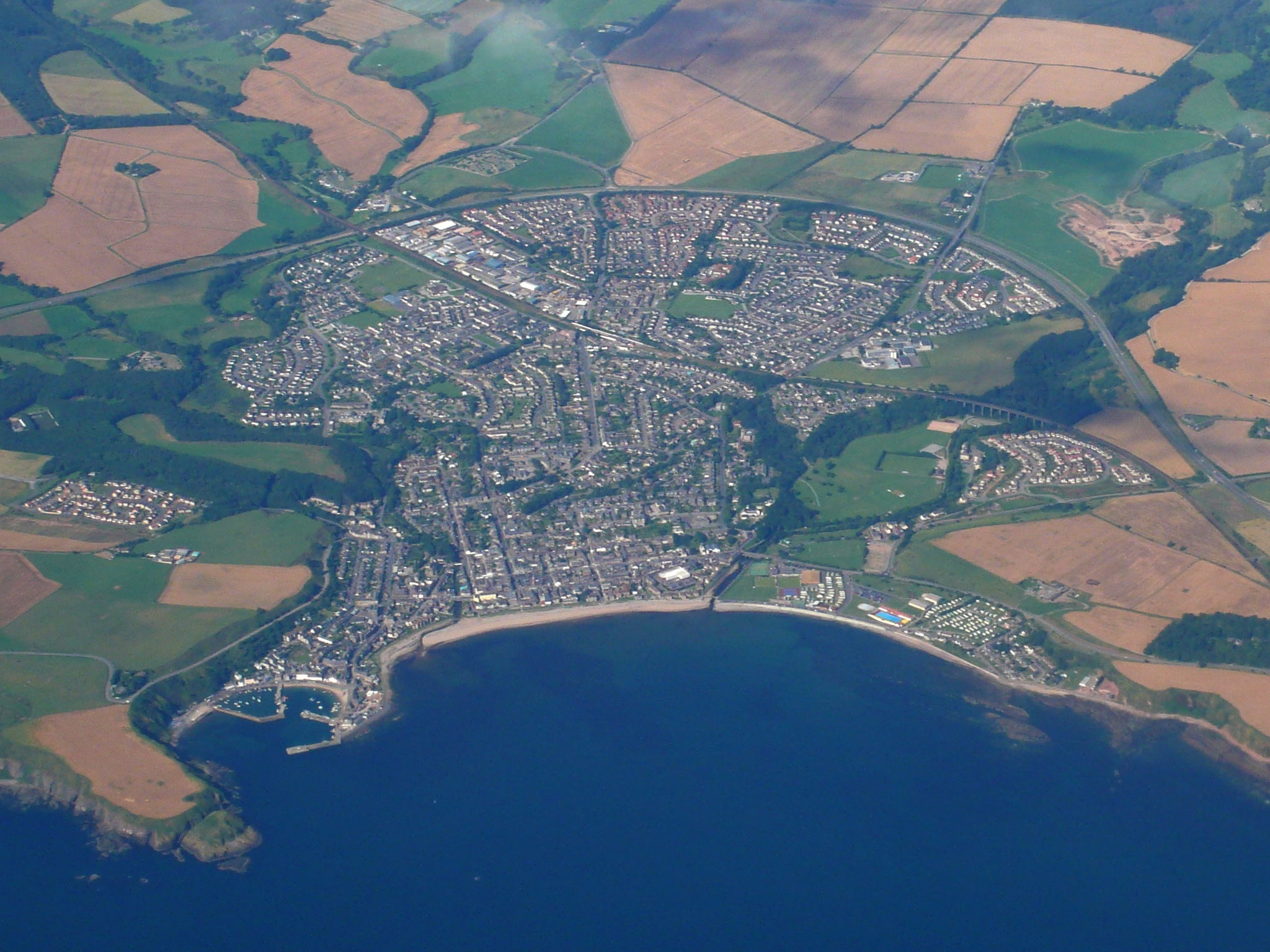
Stonehaven from the air

Stonehaven Beach

Stonehaven is 15 miles (24 km) south of Aberdeen sheltered in Stonehaven Bay. The Carron Water and Cowie Water run through the town. Stonehaven lies adjacent to a deeply indented bay surrounded on three sides by higher land between Downie Point and Garron Point. The harbour, consisting of two basins, was improved in the 1820s by the engineer Robert Stevenson (grandfather of the author Robert Louis Stevenson), and became an important centre of the 19th century herring trade; the harbour is bordered on the north by Bellman's Head and the south by Downie Point. At the western edge of Stonehaven west of the A90 road lies the village of Kirkton of Fetteresso. Nearby to the south, Fowlsheugh is a coastal nature reserve, known for its 230-foot-high cliff formations and habitat supporting prolific seabird nesting colonies.

Stonehaven has grown rapidly since the oil boom in Aberdeen. The increasing demand for new, middle-class housing has seen four new estates being appended to the town, creating an expanse of suburbs and Stonehaven has been bypassed since 1984.

Parts of Stonehaven near to the Carron Water were prone to flooding following heavy rain. Aberdeenshire Council has completed construction of flood defenses in 2023 that have now been effective at preventing flooding from major storms.

The Highland Boundary Fault traverses Scotland from the Isle of Arran and Helensburgh on the west coast to immediately north of Stonehaven on the east coast.

== Parks and green spaces ==
The largest park is Mineralwell, situated adjacent to the Glenury Viaduct which carries the Dundee–Aberdeen line. St Kieran's Well, a grade-C listed public fountain, is situated in the park. It was restored in 1982, though its water supply has since been severed. The park contains one of the largest purpose built radio controlled car circuits in the UK, located at the edge of the park beside the viaduct. The John McRobert Pavilion was opened in the park in 1993 and an artificial turf pitch opened in the park in 2015. The park is home to a parkrun. In 2021, 120 cherry blossom trees were planted as part of the Sakura Cherry Tree Project. The trees are dedicated to Thomas Blake Glover.

Nearby Baird Park occupies an area of four acres and was given to the town by Sir Alexander Baird in 1920, though it had been leased to the council for the previous twelve years.

Stonehaven Recreation Grounds was opened in 1885 and is situated near the beach. It is owned by the council. It contains tennis courts and a bowling green.

Dunnottar Woods is a 32.91-hectare (81.3-acre) woodland area managed by the Woodland Trust.

== Education ==
The town has a secondary school, Mackie Academy, which was founded at the site occupied currently by Arduthie School. Mackie takes pupils from a relatively large chunk of southern Aberdeenshire with its catchment zone stretching from Johnshaven and St Cyrus (Although the primary school is in the catchment area for Mearns Academy in Laurencekirk) in the south to Netherley in the north and out to Drumlithie in the west. The feeder primary schools include: Glenbervie, Inverbervie, Lairhillock, Gourdon, Catterline, Kinneff, Arduthie, Mill’o forest, Dunnottar and Carronhill.

There are three primary schools:

- Arduthie School is one of the three primary schools in Stonehaven serving a large portion of the north and east of the town as well as the surrounding countryside to the north-west.
- Dunnottar School was founded in 1889. It is linked to the notable Parish Church and the historic Dunnottar Castle and is located at the edge of the old town. It serves the old town and the majority of the countryside surrounding Stonehaven As part of the Stonehaven flooding in 2009 the school was affected and pupils had to be relocated for a week while work was undertaken. There have been plans to replace this school in recent years, but they are now abandoned.
- Mill O' Forest School, is located in the newer part of Stonehaven and serves the south and parts of the north of the town. It opened in 1977.

One special education school, Carronhill, opened in 1975. It is situated in the newer part of the town near Mill O' Forest Primary School.

== Commerce and culture ==
Stonehaven Harbour

Historically the chief commerce of Stonehaven lay in fishing. Led by the herring fishery, the catch peaked around the year 1894 with a peak catch of about 15 million fish per annum and employment in the fishing industry of 1280 people. Due to overfishing to serve the expanding regional population, the fishing industry declined with diminishing catches, such that by 1939 only a remnant of the earlier fishing fleet continued to exist, and the catch mostly supported the local population from that point onward. Glenury distillery was situated near Mineralwell park, and closed in 1985.

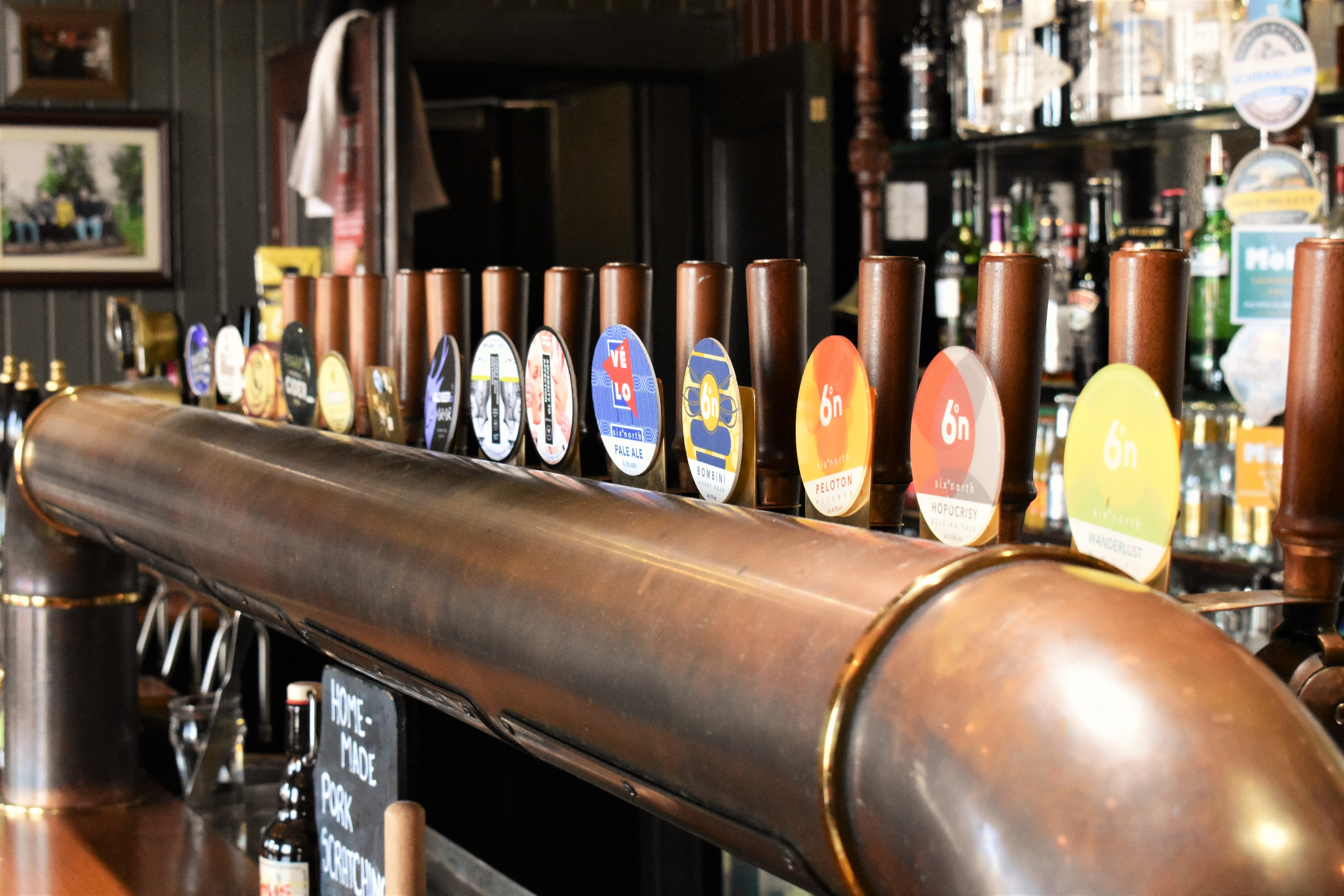
Bar At The Marine Hotel, Stonehaven Harbour

Currently, the town's primary industries are marine services and tourism, with Dunnottar Castle, a local landmark, bringing in a large number of tourists every year. Dunnottar Castle is regularly used in promotional material by the Scottish tourism industry; in addition, it was used in the 1990 film Hamlet, and appeared as a featured desktop background in the UK edition of Microsoft Windows 7. Furthermore, Dunnottar Castle was also selected as Merida's home in the Disney movie, Brave. Situated nearby is Stonehaven War Memorial, constructed after World War I. It was unveiled by Viscountess Cowdray in 1923. It is visible from much of the town thanks to its prominent position on a hilltop overlooking the bay. Another attractive feature of the town is the long beach facing the North Sea, with large cliffs at either end sheltering small rock pools and inlets. It is also famous for its Olympic-size outdoor swimming pool, which is heated and filled with filtered seawater. The local harbour features the Tolbooth, the town's small museum of local heritage.

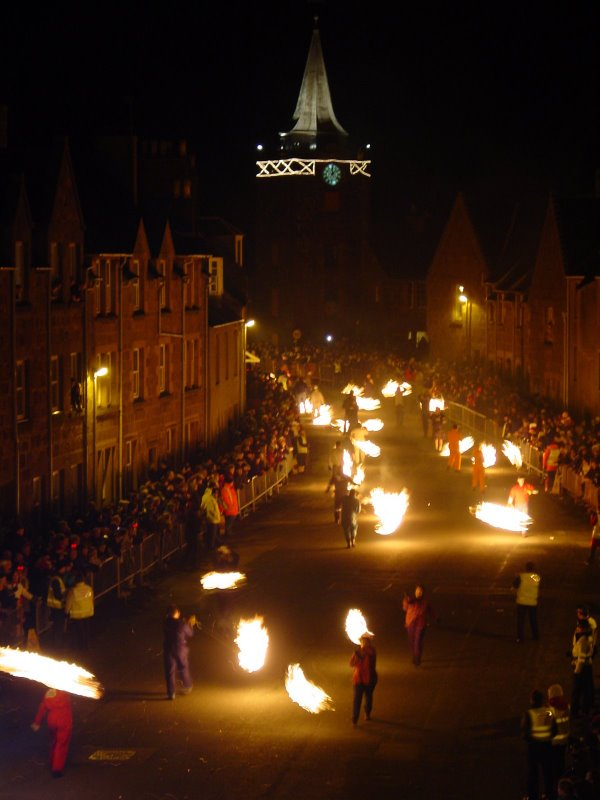
Stonehaven Fireballs Ceremony 2003

During Hogmanay festivities, crowds watch the annual fireball ceremony in which volunteers walk down the High Street swinging their fireball - a homemade ball of burning waste materials with a chain and handle attached. The Fireball Festival was part of the content of STV's Hogmanay coverage. After, the fireballs are finally thrown into the harbour. It is uncertain when the tradition of the fireballs began, however, reports covering the event from as early as 1911 exist. The event has taken place annually, though has been cancelled during the world wars and in 2021 due to the COVID-19 pandemic. Stonehaven's long-established pipe band plays at events throughout the year, including the folks festival and fireball ceremony. The band has competed at various levels throughout its history including several years at Grade 1.

=== Cuisine ===
The town's Haven Fish Bar was the likely origin of the deep-fried Mars Bar, a snack now culturally associated with Scotland - and its health record - as a whole. In 2012, the (since renamed) Carron fish and chip shop sold around 100–150 deep-fried Mars bars per week, with tourists accounting for around 70% of this figure. The Carron was awarded No 1 Fish and Chip Shop in Scotland 2020. Another local fish and chip shop, the Bay, was awarded the number one fish and chip shop in Scotland, at the National fish and Chip awards in 2012 and 2013.

=== Sports and events ===
Every July, Stonehaven holds a Highland Games. All those competing in the heavy events (which include the Hammer, the Heavy Stone, and Tossing the Caber) must wear full Highland dress. Other events include the Stonehaven Folk Festival, regularly attended by famous Glaswegian comedian Billy Connolly. On the first Saturday in June, the Feein' Market recreates a 19th-century agricultural hiring fair. The RW Thomson Classic Car Rally is an annual celebration of the inventor of the pneumatic tire and attracts an impressive range of vintage and classic cars. There are two harbour festivals each summer. A farmers' market is now held once a month in the market square, where local food suppliers and producers can sell fresh fruit, vegetables, poultry, and other types of meat.

Stonehaven supports a rugby club - Mackie Academy Former Pupils Rugby Football Club - which plays in the RBS Caledonia Regional League Division 1. They have previously trained on pitches at Redcloak.

The town has a Junior football club - Stonehaven F.C. - that plays in the North Region Scottish Junior Football North Premier League. Home games are played at Glenury Park, set in Mineralwell Park. There are also three amateur football clubs: AC Mill Inn, Cowie Thistle and Stonehaven Athletic, as well as Stonehaven Youth Football Club, who all play their games in Mineralwell Park. In 2015, a combination of Stonehaven Football Club, Cowie Thistle, Stonehaven Athletic, Stonehaven Youth Football Club and Stonehaven Ladies Football Club created the Stonehaven Community Football Club, which was recognised by the Scottish Football Association with a Quality Mark Community Level Award, and subsequently the Legacy Award in November 2017.

=== Local radio ===
The Local Community Radio Station Mearns FM broadcasts to the town and surrounding area, including Inverbervie and Laurencekirk. Staffed completely by volunteers, it is run as a not-for-profit organisation, broadcasting under a community radio license, with a remit to provide locally focused news, events, and programming. Jointly funded by local adverts and local and national grants, Mearns FM has one of the largest listening areas of any community radio station owing to the Mearns' distributed population.

== Notable residents ==
Stonehaven was the birthplace of Robert William Thomson, inventor of the pneumatic tyre. It is also the birthplace of James Murdoch, a journalist and Orientalist, Lord Reith of Stonehaven, the first Director-General of the BBC, and Tom McEwen, a Canadian communist politician and trade union organiser.

John Ellis, an architect who was born and lived here, was responsible for many local buildings including the War Memorial. George Thomson Chapman (1824–1881), a New Zealand publisher, was born in Stonehaven.

Ury House, Stonehaven, is the ancestral seat of the Viscounts Stonehaven. It was built by Sir Alexander Baird, 1st Baronet in 1885.

The novelist Lewis Grassic Gibbon (James Leslie Mitchell) attended school at what was the old Mackie Academy (now Arduthie Primary).

Famous historical visitors include William Wallace and Mary, Queen of Scots. Poet Robert Burns met friends in Stonehaven in 1787.

== Transport ==
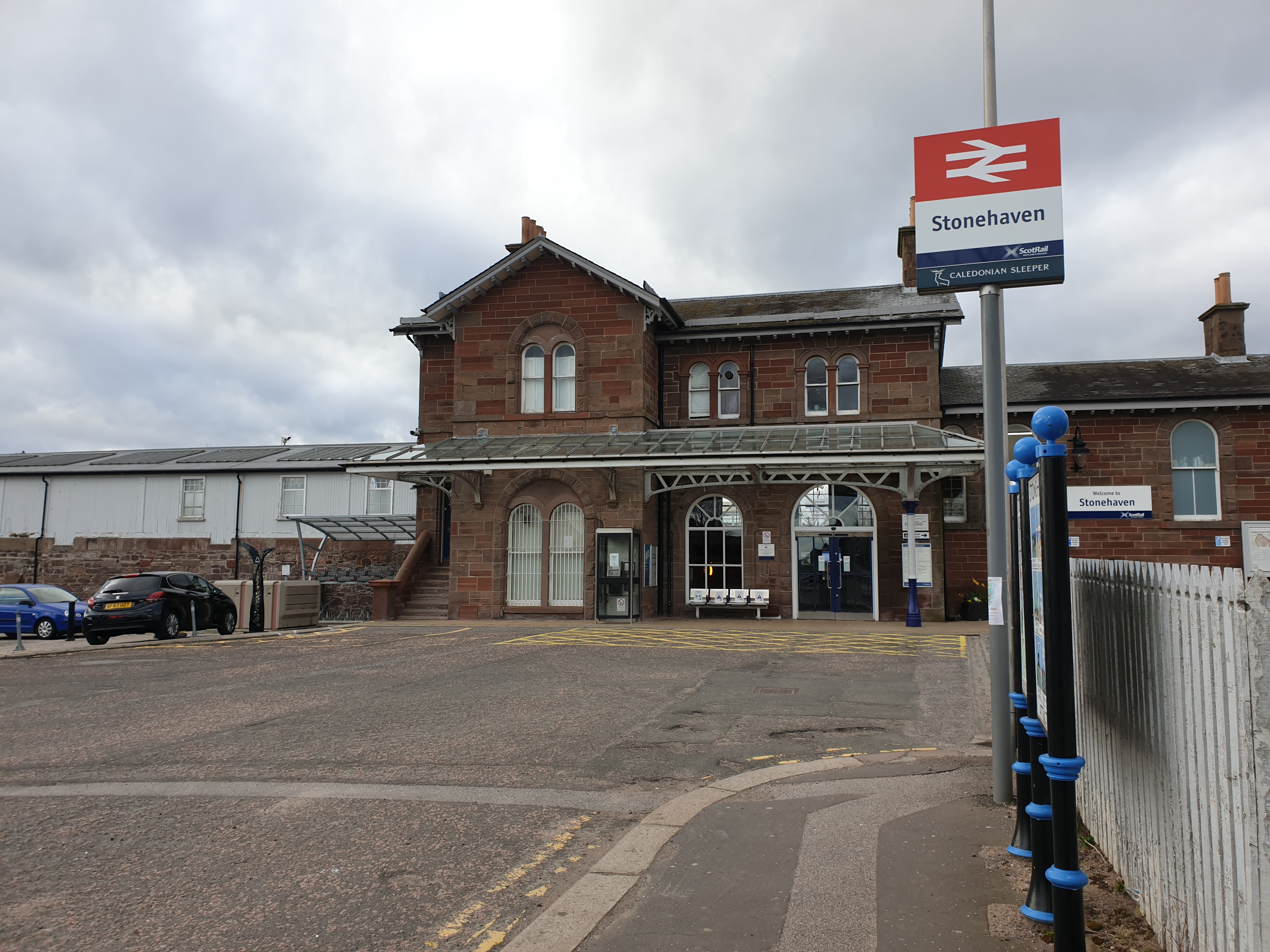
Stonehaven railway station

The town has been served by Stonehaven railway station on the Dundee–Aberdeen line since 1849. Initially located outside the town, it has been absorbed by the growing town. The A90 road bypasses the town and meets the A92 here. The town has a local service and is also on the X7 Coastrider route between Aberdeen and Dundee. A locally run Land Train runs from the town square to the outdoor pool, Dunnottar Castle and the harbour.

== Public services ==
Woodcot Hospital operated from 1867 to 1998. Kincardine Community Hospital continues to operate today. On 11 June 2013 it was decided by the Justice Committee that Stonehaven Sheriff Court would be closed despite a petition attracting nearly 300 signatures and disagreement from the local community.

Lifeboats were provided by the local charity Maritime Rescue Institute until its closure in 2013. A Royal National Lifeboat Institution station was subsequently established.

Stonehaven Leisure Centre was opened in 1985 following an investment of £650,000 and contains sports halls and a 25-metre indoor swimming pool near the more famous open air version.
