= Fort William Sheriff Court =

Judicial building in Fort William, Scotland

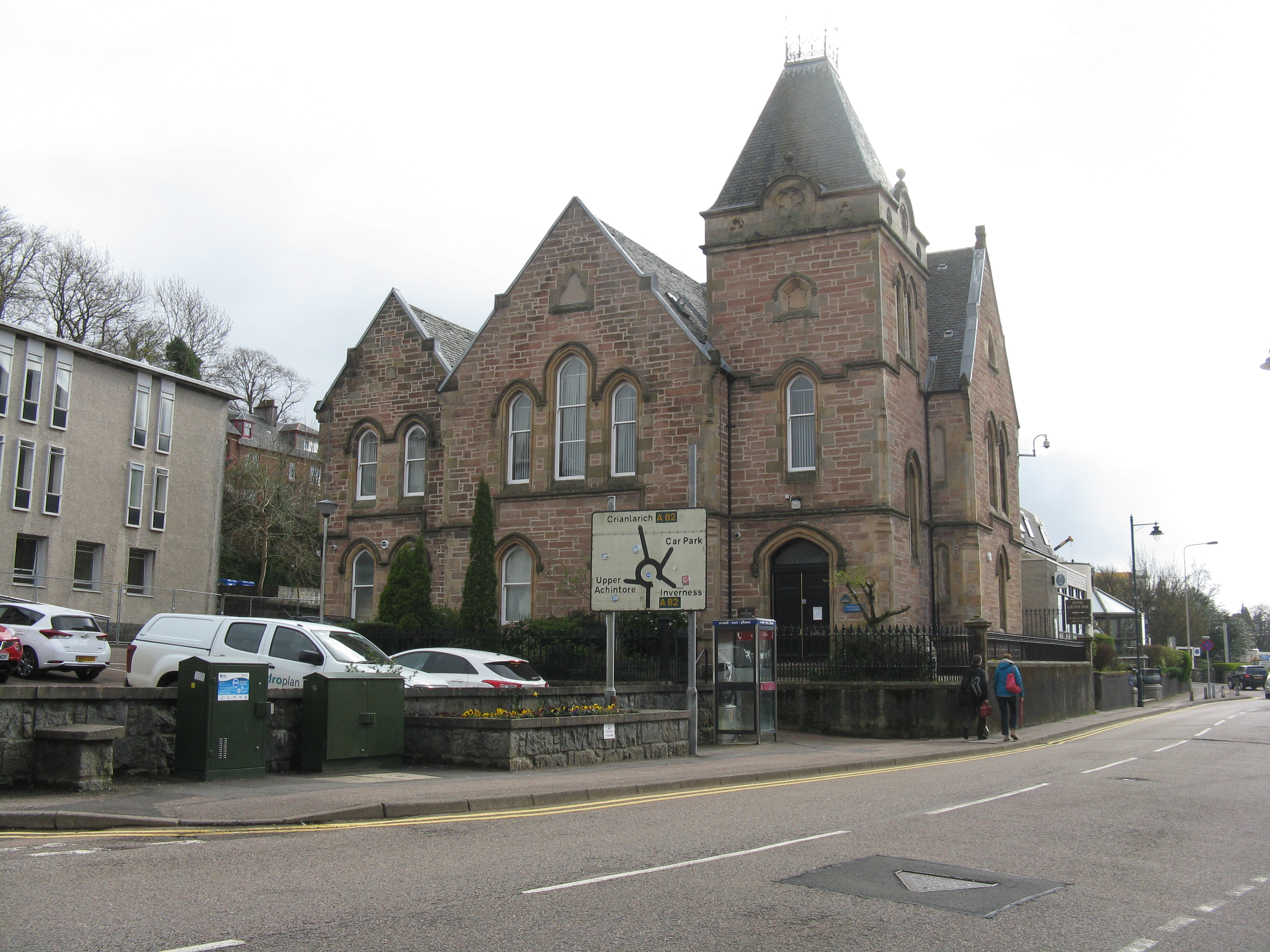
- The building in 2017

- Shown in Lochaber
- 56.8154°N 5.1154°W
- Location: High Street, Fort William

History
- Built: 1876

Site notes
- Architect(s): James Matthews and William Lawrie
- Architectural style: Gothic Revival style

Listed Building – Category C(S)
- Official name: Fort William Sheriff Court and Justice of the Peace Court, including boundary wall, railings and gatepiers, High Street, Fort William
- Designated: 11 September 2015
- Reference no.: LB52361

Fort William Sheriff Court is a judicial building on the High Street in Fort William in Scotland. The building, which continues to be used as a courthouse, is a Category C listed building.

== History ==
Although sheriff court hearings have taken place in Fort William since 1794, a prison, with a courtroom, was only established in the town in 1849. In the early 1870s, court officials decided to commission a dedicated courthouse for the area. The site they selected was on the southeast side of the High Street, just to the west of the prison.

The new building was designed by James Matthews and William Lawrie in the Gothic Revival style, built in red sandstone and was completed in 1876. It was extended to the rear in the 1880s. The design involved an asymmetrical main frontage of three bays facing southwest down the High Street. The first bay on the left was fenestrated with a pair of arched windows with hood moulds on each floor, with a gable above. The second bay, which was projected forward, was fenestrated with a pair of arched windows with hood moulds on the ground floor, and with a set of the three arched windows with hood moulds on the first floor, with a gable containing a trefoil above. The right-hand bay was formed by a three-stage tower: there was an arched doorway with a hood mould in the first stage, an arched window with a hood mould in the second stage and a small blind window with a hood mould in the third stage, all surmounted by a frieze containing a quatrefoil and two trefoils, and pyramid-shaped roof with brattishing. Internally, the principal room was the courtroom, with a vaulted ceiling, on the first floor.

An extensive programme of refurbishment works was completed in 1996, enabling the building to continue to serve as the venue for sheriff court hearings in the area. In December 2000, the building was the venue for a fatal accident inquiry into the deaths of four venture scouts in an avalanche on Aonach Mòr in December 1998: the court found that the victims "had died of asphyxiation". Following a nationwide review of all Scottish court buildings, Historic Environment Scotland listed the building at Category C in 2015.

== See also ==
- List of listed buildings in Fort William, Highland
