= List of listed buildings in Stonehaven, Aberdeenshire =

This is a list of listed buildings in the parish of Stonehaven in Aberdeenshire, Scotland.

== List ==
| Name | Location | Date listed | Grid ref. (Note: Sometimes known as OSGB36, the grid reference (where provided) is based on the British national grid reference system used by the Ordnance Survey. • "Guide to National Grid". Ordnance Survey. • "Get-a-map". Ordnance Survey.) | Geo-coordinates | Notes | LB number (Note: Historic Environment Scotland assign a unique alphanumeric identifier to each designated site in Scotland, for listed buildings this always begins with "LB", for example "LB12345".) | Image |
|---|---|---|---|---|---|---|---|
| 20 Bath Street, The Lilies Including Boundary Walls And Gates | | | | 56°58′06″N 2°12′59″W | Category B | 41575 | Upload Photo |
| Dunnottar Avenue, St Bridget's Hall For Dunnottar Church Including Boundary Walls, Gatepiers And Gates | | | | 56°57′43″N 2°12′32″W | Category C(S) | 41584 | Upload Photo |
| 29 - 37 (Odd Nos) Cameron Street | | | | 56°57′46″N 2°12′36″W | Category C(S) | 41587 | Upload Photo |
| 45 Cameron Street | | | | 56°57′46″N 2°12′45″W | Category C(S) | 41589 | Upload Photo |
| 34 -38 (Even Nos) Cameron Street | | | | 56°57′47″N 2°12′44″W | Category C(S) | 41596 | Upload Photo |
| 7 And 8 (Burnside) Carron Terrace Including Boundary Walls And Gatepiers | | | | 56°57′45″N 2°12′46″W | Category B | 41607 | Upload Photo |
| 1 Castle Street | | | | 56°57′35″N 2°12′16″W | Category B | 41609 | Upload Photo |
| High Street, The Cross, Market Cross | | | | 56°57′39″N 2°12′16″W | Category B | 41616 | Upload Photo |
| 7, 9 And 11 Evan Street | | | | 56°57′50″N 2°12′35″W | Category C(S) | 41620 | Upload Photo |
| 24 And 26 High Street | | | | 56°57′41″N 2°12′24″W | Category C(S) | 41628 | Upload Photo |
| 28, 30 And 32 High Street, Christian's House | | | | 56°57′41″N 2°12′22″W | Category B | 41629 | Upload Photo |
| 44, 46 And 48 High Street | | | | 56°57′40″N 2°12′20″W | Category C(S) | 41631 | Upload Photo |
| 58 And 60 High Street | | | | 56°57′40″N 2°12′18″W | Category C(S) | 41632 | Upload Photo |
| Market Square, Market Buildings | | | | 56°57′51″N 2°12′30″W | Category B | 41640 | Upload another image See more images |
| Market Square Fountain | | | | 56°57′51″N 2°12′30″W | Category B | 41641 | Upload Photo |
| 1, 2 And 3 Market Square | | | | 56°57′49″N 2°12′30″W | Category B | 41642 | Upload Photo |
| 8, 9 And 10 Market Square | | | | 56°57′49″N 2°12′32″W | Category C(S) | 41645 | Upload Photo |
| 26 And 27 Market Square, Former Bank Of Scotland, Including Boundary Walls, Railings And Gates | | | | 56°57′52″N 2°12′33″W | Category C(S) | 41651 | Upload Photo |
| 30 Market Square | | | | 56°57′52″N 2°12′32″W | Category C(S) | 41652 | Upload Photo |
| 47 Slug Road And 27 Bath Street, Kirk Cottage Including Boundary Walls | | | | 56°58′05″N 2°13′05″W | Category C(S) | 41671 | Upload Photo |
| 1 Albert Lane Including Boundary Wall | | | | 56°57′37″N 2°12′17″W | Category C(S) | 41530 | Upload Photo |
| 38 And 40 Allardice Street | | | | 56°57′51″N 2°12′28″W | Category C(S) | 41535 | Upload Photo |
| 17 Ann Street | | | | 56°57′50″N 2°12′37″W | Category C(S) | 41537 | Upload Photo |
| Bath Street, Stonehaven Community Education Centre Including Ancillary Building And Boundary Walls | | | | 56°58′02″N 2°12′41″W | Category C(S) | 41544 | Upload Photo |
| 5 Arbuthnott Street | | | | 56°57′45″N 2°12′32″W | Category C(S) | 41549 | Upload Photo |
| Baird Street, The Hermitage Including Summerhouse, Boundary Walls And Gatepiers | | | | 56°58′06″N 2°12′43″W | Category B | 41555 | Upload Photo |
| 25 Market Square And 30A Barclay Street | | | | 56°57′52″N 2°12′34″W | Category C(S) | 41569 | Upload Photo |
| 4 Bath Street, Ashvale Including Walled Garden, Railings, Gate And Gatepiers | | | | 56°58′04″N 2°12′43″W | Category C(S) | 41572 | Upload Photo |
| 2 And 4 Albert Lane, 53, 55, 57 And 59 High Street, 11A, 15, 17 And 19 King Street, 4, 5 And 6 The Cross | | | | 56°57′39″N 2°12′17″W | Category C(S) | 50237 | Upload Photo |
| 1 - 4 (Inclusive Nos) Ardley Terrace Including Ancillary Building And Boundary Wall | | | | 56°57′46″N 2°12′51″W | Category C(S) | 50243 | Upload Photo |
| Arduthie Road, Viewmount, Council Offices Including Nuclear Bunker, Ancillary Building, Boundary Walls, Gatepiers And Railings | | | | 56°57′51″N 2°12′57″W | Category C(S) | 50245 | Upload Photo |
| 2 Arduthie Road, Ewen Burn Including Boundary Walls, Railings And Gate | | | | 56°57′50″N 2°12′51″W | Category C(S) | 50246 | Upload Photo |
| Bogwell Lane, Plague Gravestones | | | | 56°57′39″N 2°12′30″W | Category B | 50249 | Upload Photo |
| 1 And 3 Bridgefield Including Boundary Walls | | | | 56°57′44″N 2°12′31″W | Category C(S) | 50250 | Upload Photo |
| 2 Queen's Road, Claremont Including Boundary Walls, Gatepiers And Gates | | | | 56°57′50″N 2°13′04″W | Category C(S) | 50264 | Upload Photo |
| 8 And 10 Slug Road Including Terraced Garden And Boundary Walls | | | | 56°57′53″N 2°12′52″W | Category C(S) | 50269 | Upload Photo |
| Stonehaven Railway Station, Including Signal Box | | | | 56°58′00″N 2°13′31″W | Category B | 41672 | Upload another image See more images |
| Bath Street, Fetteresso (Church Of Scotland) | | | | 56°58′07″N 2°13′01″W | Category A | 41576 | Upload Photo |
| 47 And 49 Cameron Street | | | | 56°57′46″N 2°12′45″W | Category C(S) | 41590 | Upload Photo |
| 14 Carron Terrace Including Boundary Walls | | | | 56°57′44″N 2°12′51″W | Category C(S) | 41608 | Upload Photo |
| Cowie Mill | | | | 56°58′12″N 2°12′36″W | Category C(S) | 41614 | Upload Photo |
| 4 And 5 Market Square | | | | 56°57′49″N 2°12′31″W | Category C(S) | 41643 | Upload Photo |
| Allardice Street, Queen's Hotel | | | | 56°57′47″N 2°12′30″W | Category C(S) | 41532 | Upload Photo |
| 26 Ann Street, Johnston Lodge | | | | 56°57′52″N 2°12′39″W | Category C(S) | 41541 | Upload Photo |
| 1 Arbuthnott Street Including Boundary Walls | | | | 56°57′45″N 2°12′31″W | Category C(S) | 41547 | Upload Photo |
| Stonehaven Open Air Swimming Pool | | | | 56°58′11″N 2°12′17″W | Category B | 50183 | Upload Photo |
| 60 Arduthie Road, Isla Bank Including Boundary Walls And Gatepiers | | | | 56°57′57″N 2°13′07″W | Category C(S) | 50248 | Upload Photo |
| 1, 2 And 3 Bridgefield Terrace Including Boundary Walls | | | | 56°57′43″N 2°12′32″W | Category C(S) | 50252 | Upload Photo |
| 26 To 32 (Even Nos) Evan Street | | | | 56°57′49″N 2°12′38″W | Category C(S) | 50257 | Upload Photo |
| Glenury Viaduct, U/B Ecn5/340 | | | | 56°58′26″N 2°12′58″W | Category B | 50258 | Upload Photo |
| Robert Street, Clashfarquhar Including Terraced Garden And Boundary Walls | | | | 56°57′58″N 2°12′41″W | Category C(S) | 50265 | Upload Photo |
| Walker's Bridge, Woodcot Court, (Former Woodcot Hospital), Including Garden Walls And Lodges | | | | 56°57′41″N 2°13′18″W | Category B | 41673 | Upload another image See more images |
| Bridgefield,1 - 5 (Inclusive Nos) Rickarton Cottages Including Boundary Walls, Gatepiers And Railings | | | | 56°57′43″N 2°12′30″W | Category C(S) | 41585 | Upload Photo |
| 32 Cameron Street Including Ancillary Building And Boundary Walls | | | | 56°57′47″N 2°12′44″W | Category C(S) | 41595 | Upload Photo |
| 42 And 44 Cameron Street | | | | 56°57′47″N 2°12′46″W | Category C(S) | 41598 | Upload Photo |
| 46 Cameron Street | | | | 56°57′47″N 2°12′47″W | Category C(S) | 41599 | Upload Photo |
| 50 Cameron Street | | | | 56°57′47″N 2°12′50″W | Category C(S) | 41602 | Upload Photo |
| 23, 25 And 27 Evan Street | | | | 56°57′50″N 2°12′37″W | Category C(S) | 41621 | Upload Photo |
| 33 Evan Street, Kinnear House, And 1 Robert Street Including Boundary Walls, Gatepiers And Railings | | | | 56°57′50″N 2°12′41″W | Category B | 41622 | Upload Photo |
| Harbour Of Stonehaven | | | | 56°57′37″N 2°12′06″W | Category B | 41625 | Upload Photo |
| 51A, B And C High Street | | | | 56°57′39″N 2°12′19″W | Category B | 41626 | Upload Photo |
| 36 - 42 (Even Nos) High Street | | | | 56°57′41″N 2°12′21″W | Category C(S) | 41630 | Upload Photo |
| 12, 14 And 16 Market Square | | | | 56°57′50″N 2°12′34″W | Category B | 41647 | Upload Photo |
| 34 And 35 Market Square | | | | 56°57′52″N 2°12′31″W | Category C(S) | 41654 | Upload Photo |
| Old Pier, Old Tolbooth Sundial | | | | 56°57′38″N 2°12′07″W | Category B | 41656 | Upload another image See more images |
| Shorehead, Aberdeen And Stonehaven Yacht Club | | | | 56°57′33″N 2°12′15″W | Category C(S) | 41667 | Upload Photo |
| 19, 21 And 23 Arbuthnott Place, Carron Springs, Bowmont House And Burnside Including Boundary Walls | | | | 56°57′44″N 2°12′27″W | Category C(S) | 41545 | Upload Photo |
| 21 Bath Street, Ardgour Including Boundary Walls | | | | 56°58′04″N 2°13′01″W | Category C(S) | 41571 | Upload Photo |
| 31 And 33 Allardice Street | | | | 56°57′52″N 2°12′30″W | Category C(S) | 50238 | Upload Photo |
| 23 And 25 Ann Street | | | | 56°57′51″N 2°12′37″W | Category C(S) | 50241 | Upload Photo |
| 46 Arduthie Road And 2 Princess Road Including Boundary Walls And Gatepiers | | | | 56°57′57″N 2°13′01″W | Category C(S) | 50247 | Upload Photo |
| 10 And 12 Evan Street | | | | 56°57′49″N 2°12′36″W | Category C(S) | 50256 | Upload Photo |
| High Street, Dunnottar Primary School Including Boundary Walls, Gatepiers, Gates, Railings And Janitor's Lodge | | | | 56°57′41″N 2°12′28″W | Category C(S) | 50260 | Upload Photo |
| 23 Slug Road, Ashley Cottage, Including Boundary Walls And Gates | | | | 56°57′53″N 2°12′48″W | Category C(S) | 50267 | Upload Photo |
| Stonehaven Recreation Grounds, Bowling Club Pavilion | | | | 56°58′05″N 2°12′29″W | Category C(S) | 50271 | Upload Photo |
| Belmont Brae, Belmont House Including Boundary Walls, Gatepiers And Garden Railings | | | | 56°58′04″N 2°12′37″W | Category C(S) | 41578 | Upload Photo |
| 51 Cameron Street | | | | 56°57′46″N 2°12′46″W | Category C(S) | 41591 | Upload Photo |
| 7, 9 And 11 Castle Street | | | | 56°57′34″N 2°12′18″W | Category C(S) | 41612 | Upload Photo |
| High Street, The Cross, The Town House | | | | 56°57′39″N 2°12′16″W | Category B | 41615 | Upload another image See more images |
| Dunnottar Avenue, Sheriff Court House With Police Station Including Boundary Walls | | | | 56°57′41″N 2°12′31″W | Category B | 41617 | Upload another image |
| Evan Street, Langdon Including Ancillary Building, Boundary Walls And Gatepiers | | | | 56°57′48″N 2°13′05″W | Category C(S) | 41624 | Upload Photo |
| 31 And 32 Market Square | | | | 56°57′52″N 2°12′31″W | Category C(S) | 41653 | Upload Photo |
| 5 Shorehead, The Ship Inn | | | | 56°57′38″N 2°12′14″W | Category C(S) | 41660 | Upload another image See more images |
| Shorehead, Marine Hotel | | | | 56°57′37″N 2°12′15″W | Category C(S) | 41662 | Upload another image See more images |
| 18 Shorehead | | | | 56°57′33″N 2°12′15″W | Category C(S) | 41666 | Upload Photo |
| Allardice Street, Town Hall | | | | 56°57′50″N 2°12′28″W | Category B | 41534 | Upload another image |
| 43 And 45 Barclay Street With 8A, 8B And 10 Mary Street | | | | 56°57′54″N 2°12′33″W | Category C(S) | 41561 | Upload Photo |
| 45 And 47 Allardice Street | | | | 56°57′53″N 2°12′31″W | Category C(S) | 50239 | Upload Photo |
| 20 Ann Street | | | | 56°57′50″N 2°12′39″W | Category B | 50242 | Upload Photo |
| Arduthie Road, Arduthie Primary School Including War Memorial, Boundary Walls And Railings | | | | 56°57′55″N 2°13′00″W | Category C(S) | 50244 | Upload Photo |
| 19 Bridgefield Including Milestone And Bridge Pier | | | | 56°57′46″N 2°12′30″W | Category C(S) | 50251 | Upload Photo |
| 25 Slug Road, Rowandale Including Boundary Walls And Gates | | | | 56°57′54″N 2°12′49″W | Category C(S) | 50268 | Upload Photo |
| 82 Cameron Street, Rosebank Cottage Including Ancillary Buildings, Boundary Walls And Railings | | | | 56°57′47″N 2°13′02″W | Category B | 41604 | Upload Photo |
| 82 High Street | | | | 56°57′39″N 2°12′15″W | Category C(S) | 41635 | Upload Photo |
| 3, 4 And 5 Old Pier | | | | 56°57′39″N 2°12′09″W | Category B | 41658 | Upload Photo |
| 23 And 24 Shorehead | | | | 56°57′32″N 2°12′14″W | Category C(S) | 41670 | Upload Photo |
| 11 And 13 Arbuthnott Street | | | | 56°57′45″N 2°12′34″W | Category C(S) | 41551 | Upload Photo |
| Arbuthnott Street, St James The Great Episcopal Church Including Boundary Walls, Gatepiers And Gates | | | | 56°57′45″N 2°12′36″W | Category A | 41552 | Upload another image See more images |
| 15, 17 And 19 Barclay Street | | | | 56°57′49″N 2°12′33″W | Category C(S) | 41557 | Upload Photo |
| Mineralwell Park, St Kieran's Well | | | | 56°58′22″N 2°13′05″W | Category C(S) | 50263 | Upload Photo |
| 15 And 15A Robert Street, Ellerslie House | | | | 56°57′56″N 2°12′41″W | Category C(S) | 50266 | Upload Photo |
| Stonehaven Railway Station, Goods Sheds | | | | 56°58′00″N 2°13′29″W | Category C(S) | 50270 | Upload Photo |
| 60 And 62 Barclay Street | | | | 56°57′55″N 2°12′35″W | Category C(S) | 50272 | Upload Photo |
| 24 Market Square | | | | 56°57′51″N 2°12′35″W | Category C(S) | 51028 | Upload Photo |
| 11 Bridgefield | | | | 56°57′45″N 2°12′31″W | Category C(S) | 41581 | Upload Photo |
| 26 And 28 Cameron Street, Cameron House Including Boundary Walls | | | | 56°57′47″N 2°12′42″W | Category B | 41594 | Upload Photo |
| 74 Cameron Street, South Church Manse, Including Boundary Walls And Gatepiers | | | | 56°57′48″N 2°12′58″W | Category B | 41603 | Upload Photo |
| 3 Castle Street | | | | 56°57′35″N 2°12′16″W | Category C(S) | 41610 | Upload Photo |
| 1, 3 And 5 Evan Street | | | | 56°57′50″N 2°12′35″W | Category C(S) | 41619 | Upload Photo |
| Keith Place, Rivendell, Former Textile Yard Including Sea Wall | | | | 56°57′40″N 2°12′13″W | Category A | 41638 | Upload Photo |
| 1, 1A And 2 Old Pier Including Boundary Walls | | | | 56°57′39″N 2°12′10″W | Category C(S) | 41657 | Upload Photo |
| Shorehead, Duthie's Well | | | | 56°57′38″N 2°12′12″W | Category B | 41659 | Upload Photo |
| 14 Shorehead | | | | 56°57′35″N 2°12′15″W | Category C(S) | 41665 | Upload Photo |
| 3 Arbuthnott Street | | | | 56°57′45″N 2°12′32″W | Category C(S) | 41548 | Upload Photo |
| 4 Bridgefield Terrace, Coach House Including Boundary Walls, Railings And Gate | | | | 56°57′43″N 2°12′34″W | Category C(S) | 50253 | Upload Photo |
| High Street, Sea Cadet Hall, Former Episcopal School Including Boundary Walls | | | | 56°57′39″N 2°12′23″W | Category C(S) | 50259 | Upload Photo |
| 9 High Street Including Ancillary Building And Boundary Walls | | | | 56°57′40″N 2°12′25″W | Category C(S) | 50261 | Upload Photo |
| 4 John Street | | | | 56°57′38″N 2°12′15″W | Category C(S) | 50262 | Upload Photo |
| 85 Cameron Street, Carronbank House Including Terraced Garden, Boundary Walls, Gatepiers And Gates | | | | 56°57′45″N 2°13′10″W | Category A | 41593 | Upload Photo |
| 40 Cameron Street | | | | 56°57′47″N 2°12′45″W | Category C(S) | 41597 | Upload Photo |
| 1 Carron Terrace, Woodburn Including Boundary Walls And Ancillary Building | | | | 56°57′46″N 2°12′43″W | Category C(S) | 41606 | Upload Photo |
| 2, 4 And 6 Evan Street | | | | 56°57′49″N 2°12′35″W | Category C(S) | 41623 | Upload Photo |
| 8 High Street | | | | 56°57′42″N 2°12′27″W | Category C(S) | 41627 | Upload Photo |
| 94 And 96 High Street | | | | 56°57′39″N 2°12′12″W | Category C(S) | 41637 | Upload Photo |
| 11 Market Square And 23 Barclay Street | | | | 56°57′49″N 2°12′33″W | Category C(S) | 41646 | Upload Photo |
| Old Pier, Old Tolbooth Of Stonehaven Including Boundary Walls And Gates | | | | 56°57′39″N 2°12′08″W | Category A | 41655 | Upload another image See more images |
| Allardice Street, Former Crown Hotel | | | | 56°57′50″N 2°12′28″W | Category C(S) | 41533 | Upload Photo |
| Allardice Street, Royal Hotel | | | | 56°57′51″N 2°12′28″W | Category C(S) | 41536 | Upload Photo |
| 21 And 21A Ann Street | | | | 56°57′50″N 2°12′37″W | Category C(S) | 41539 | Upload Photo |
| Ann Street, Clydesdale Bank And 29 Evan Street Including Boundary Walls And Gatepier | | | | 56°57′50″N 2°12′39″W | Category B | 41540 | Upload Photo |
| Arbuthnott Place, Roman Catholic Church Of The Immaculate Conception Including Boundary Walls, Gates, Railings And Soup Kitchen | | | | 56°57′43″N 2°12′28″W | Category B | 41546 | Upload Photo |
| Barclay Street, Invercowie House And Plas Newyd, Including Garden Wall, Gate And Ancillary Building | | | | 56°58′01″N 2°12′36″W | Category B | 41570 | Upload Photo |
| 19 Cameron Street | | | | 56°57′46″N 2°12′34″W | Category C(S) | 50254 | Upload Photo |
| 2 Carron Terrace, Gowan Bank Including Boundary Walls | | | | 56°57′46″N 2°12′43″W | Category C(S) | 50255 | Upload Photo |
| 6 Bath Street, Bath Lodge Including Boundary Walls, Gatepiers, Gate And Standard Lamp | | | | 56°58′05″N 2°12′48″W | Category B | 41573 | Upload Photo |
| 18 Bath Street, Tudor Lodge Including Boundary Walls | | | | 56°58′06″N 2°12′57″W | Category B | 41574 | Upload Photo |
| Westfield Road, Heugh Hotel Including Ancillary Building Boundary Walls And Gatepiers | | | | 56°58′06″N 2°13′10″W | Category B | 41577 | Upload Photo |
| 41 And 43 Cameron Street Incorporating 3 Carron Terrace, Medwyn Cottage Incl Boundary Walls | | | | 56°57′46″N 2°12′44″W | Category C(S) | 41588 | Upload Photo |
| Cameron Street, South Church, Church Of Scotland Parish Church, Including Church Hall | | | | 56°57′46″N 2°12′47″W | Category C(S) | 41592 | Upload Photo |
| 20 Cameron Street, Carron Restaurant, Including Terraced Garden, Boundary Walls, Gatepiers And Gates | | | | 56°57′48″N 2°12′39″W | Category B | 41605 | Upload Photo |
| Cowie Bridge Over Cowie Water | | | | 56°58′04″N 2°12′34″W | Category B | 41613 | Upload another image See more images |
| 5 - 16 (Inclusive Nos) Bridgefield Terrace, The Mill Inn | | | | 56°57′43″N 2°12′35″W | Category B | 41618 | Upload Photo |
| 6 And 7 Market Square | | | | 56°57′49″N 2°12′31″W | Category C(S) | 41644 | Upload Photo |
| Shorehead, The Granary | | | | 56°57′36″N 2°12′15″W | Category C(S) | 41663 | Upload Photo |
| 19 Shorehead | | | | 56°57′33″N 2°12′15″W | Category B | 41668 | Upload Photo |
| 19 Ann Street | | | | 56°57′50″N 2°12′37″W | Category C(S) | 41538 | Upload Photo |
| 56 Ann Street, Harley House Including Boundary Walls, Gatepiers, Gates And Railings | | | | 56°57′57″N 2°12′39″W | Category B | 41543 | Upload Photo |
| 7 And 9 Arbuthnott Street | | | | 56°57′45″N 2°12′33″W | Category C(S) | 41550 | Upload Photo |
| Arbuthnott Street, White Bridge | | | | 56°57′46″N 2°12′38″W | Category C(S) | 41553 | Upload another image |
| Arduthie Road, Edenholme Including Boundary Walls And Gatepiers | | | | 56°57′58″N 2°13′12″W | Category C(S) | 41554 | Upload Photo |
| 8 Barclay Street | | | | 56°57′48″N 2°12′35″W | Category C(S) | 41563 | Upload Photo |
| 10 Barclay Street | | | | 56°57′48″N 2°12′35″W | Category B | 41564 | Upload Photo |
| 22 Bath Street, Maxieburn Including Boundary Walls And Gates | | | | 56°58′06″N 2°13′05″W | Category C(S) | 49508 | Upload Photo |
| 8 Allardice Street | | | | 56°57′48″N 2°12′29″W | Category C(S) | 50240 | Upload Photo |

== Key ==
The scheme for classifying buildings in Scotland is:

- Category A: "buildings of national or international importance, either architectural or historic; or fine, little-altered examples of some particular period, style or building type."
- Category B: "buildings of regional or more than local importance; or major examples of some particular period, style or building type, which may have been altered."
- Category C: "buildings of local importance; lesser examples of any period, style, or building type, as originally constructed or moderately altered; and simple traditional buildings which group well with other listed buildings."

In March 2016 there were 47,288 listed buildings in Scotland. Of these, 8% were Category A, and 50% were Category B, with the remaining 42% being Category C.

== See also ==
- List of listed buildings in Aberdeenshire
