= James Matthews (architect) =

Scottish architect (1819–1898)

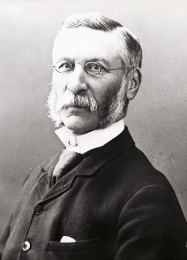
- Born: December 1819; Aberdeen, Scotland
- Died: 28 June 1898 (aged 78); Aberdeen, Scotland
- Occupation: Architect

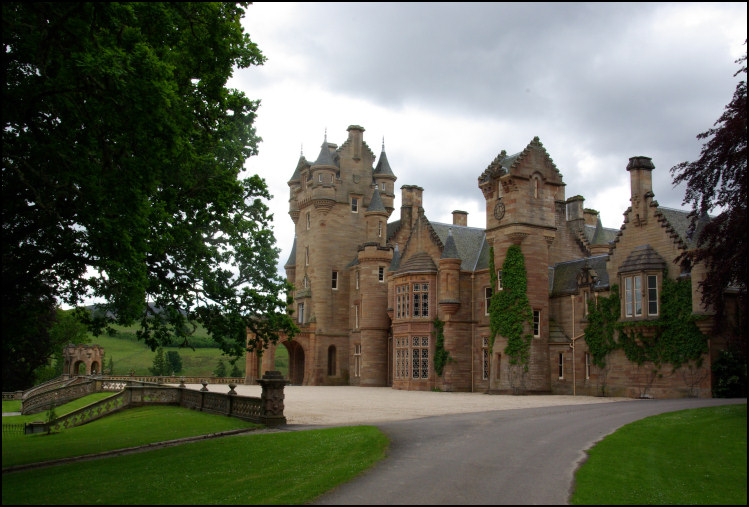
Ardross Castle

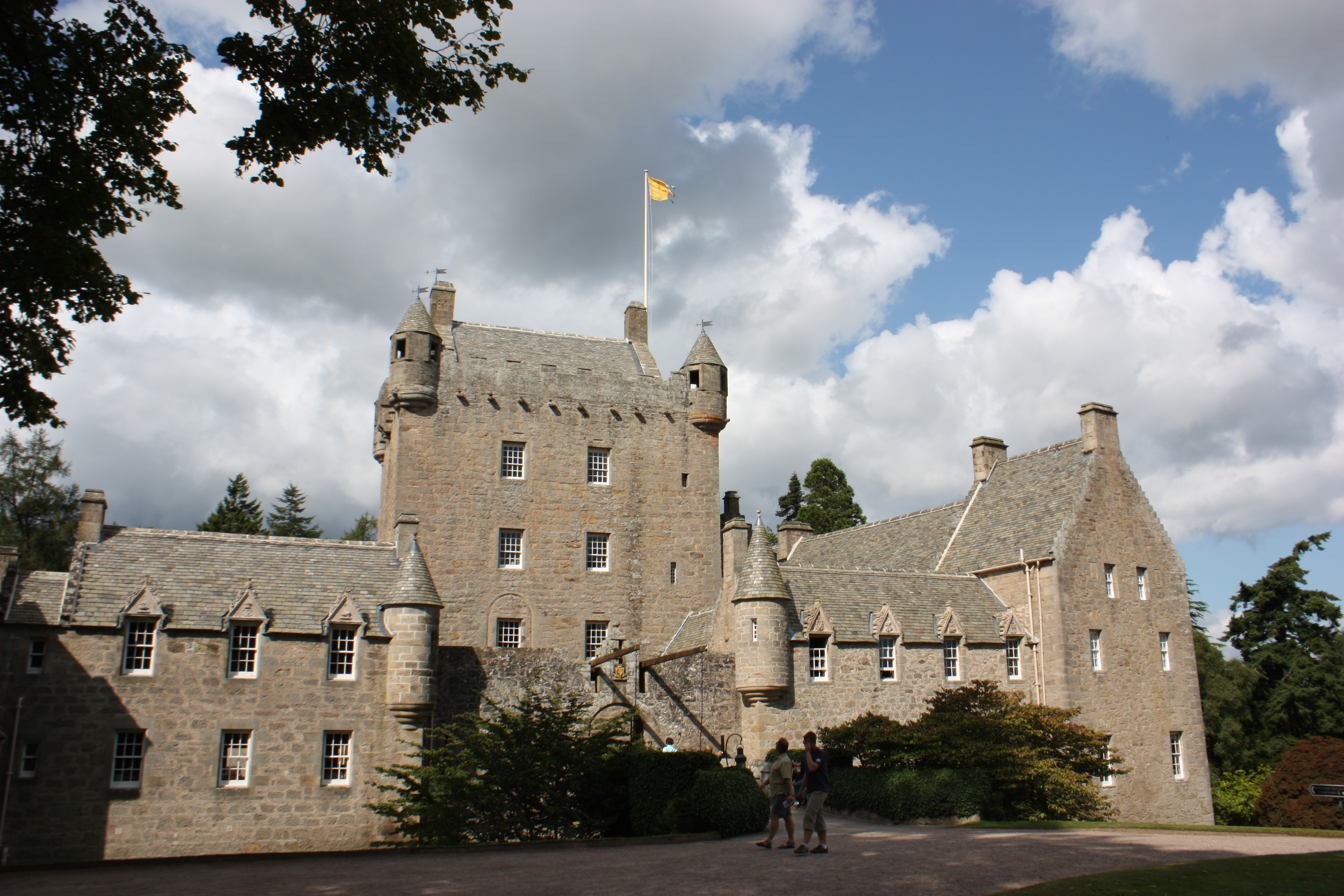
Cawdor Castle

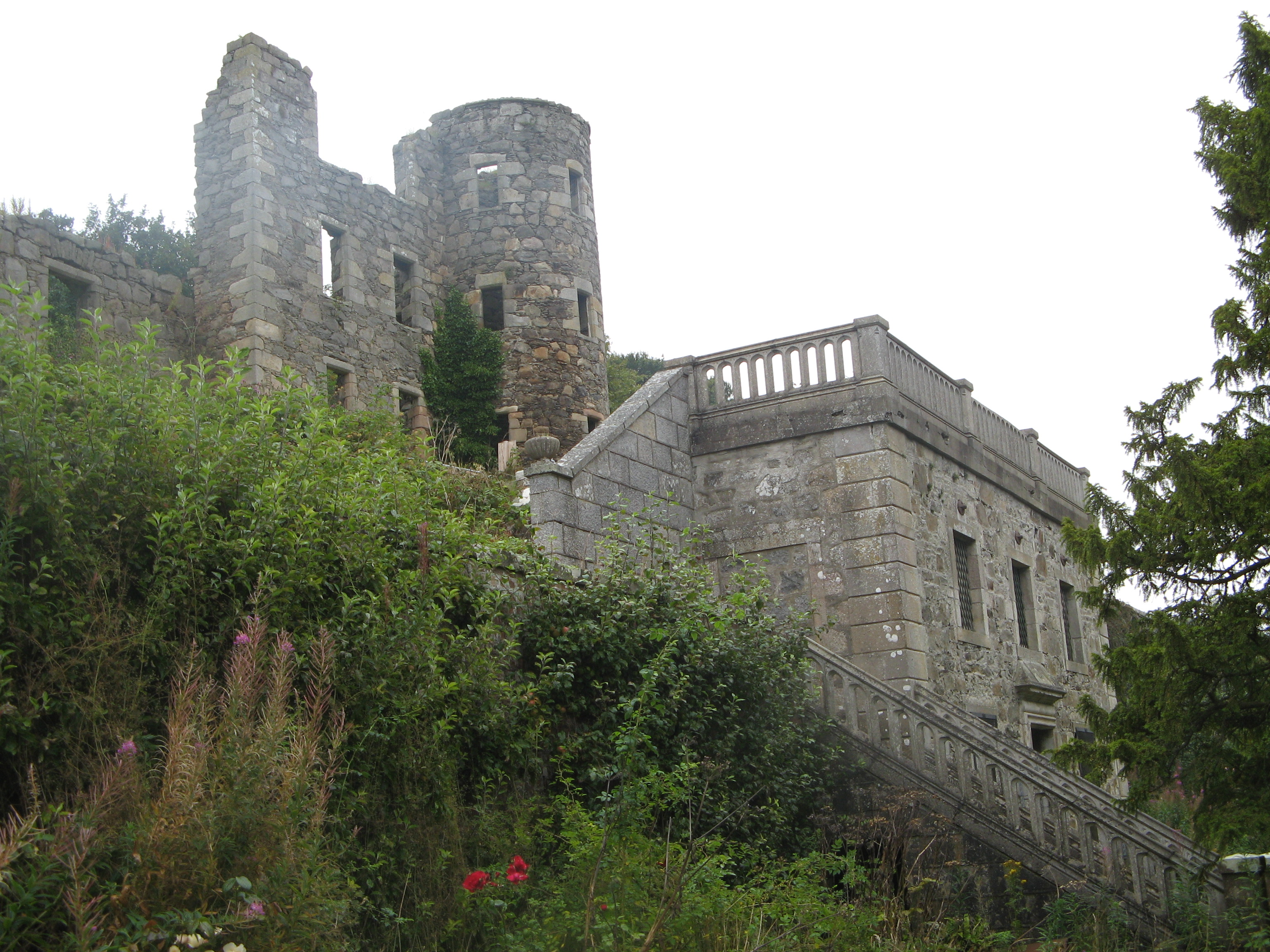
Terraces of Ellon Castle

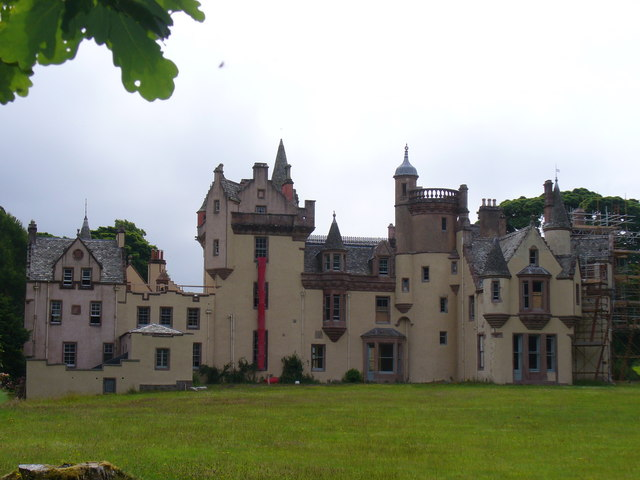
Aldourie Castle

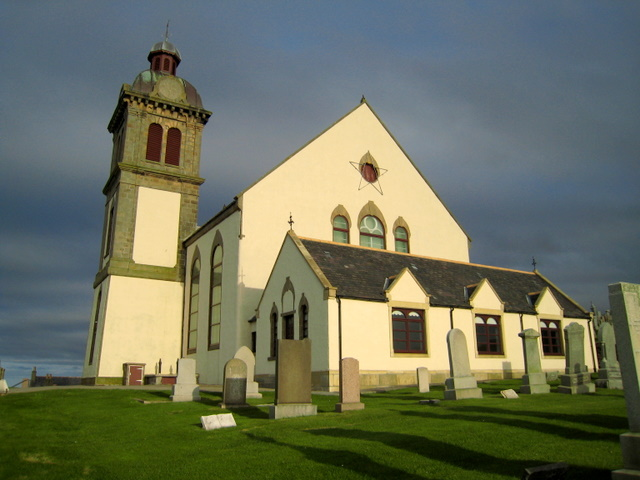
Macduff Parish Church

James Matthews (12 December 1819 – 28 June 1898) was a prominent 19th-century architect in northern Scotland who also served as Lord Provost of Aberdeen from 1883 to 1886 during which time he enacted an important city improvement plan. His work as an architect is largely in the Scots baronial style.

== Life ==
He was born in December 1819, the son of Peter Matthews, a bank teller, living on Thistle Street in Aberdeen. His mother was Margaret Ross, daughter of the architect William Ross who had built the Union Bridge in the centre of the city.

In 1834 he was articled to the local architect, Archibald Simpson to train as an architect. Here he met Thomas MacKenzie (1814-1854) whom he later went into partnership with. In 1839 he took the radical step of moving to London to work under George Gilbert Scott where he honed his design and business skills. Returning to Aberdeen in 1844 Simpson offered him a partnership but he instead set up with his assistant to create MacKenzie & Matthews.

In 1850 he was living at 16 Adelphi Court in Aberdeen Following Mackenzie's death in 1854 Matthews practiced alone. His commissions ranged from banks and churches to the remodelling of several country houses and castles (most notably Cawdor) but following the Education (Scotland) Act 1872 he was involved in the wave of necessary school building.

In 1863 Matthews entered Aberdeen Town Council as a councillor, but stood down in 1871. In 1883 he was suddenly and unexpectedly called upon to take the role of Lord Provost, replacing Peter Esslemont. During his term of office he oversaw several city improvement schemes including the Mitchell Tower and new University Graduation Hall. In 1886 he was succeeded by Sir William Henderson. Matthews services to the city brought him an honorary doctorate (LLD) from the University of Aberdeen.

In later life he purchased Springhill House on the edge of the city which he enlarged and altered to his own needs.

He died at his town house, 15 Albyn Terrace, on 28 June 1898, aged 78. He is buried with his family in St Nicholas' Churchyard in Aberdeen.

== Family ==
He was married to Elizabeth Duncan, and their children included the zoologist James Duncan Matthews.

== Principal works ==
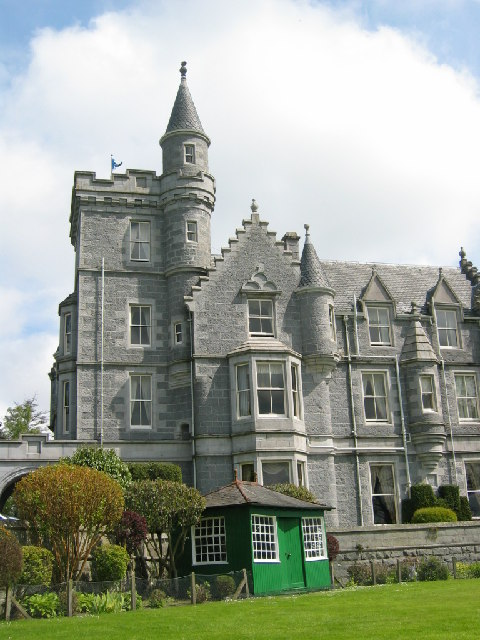
Ardoe House

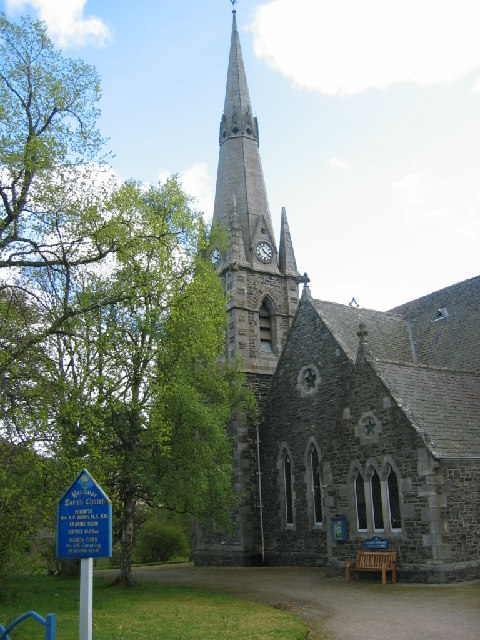
Braemar Parish Church

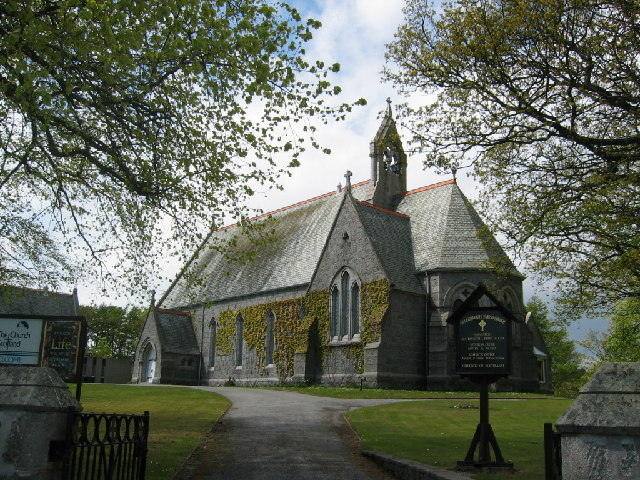
Craigiebuckler Church, Aberdeen

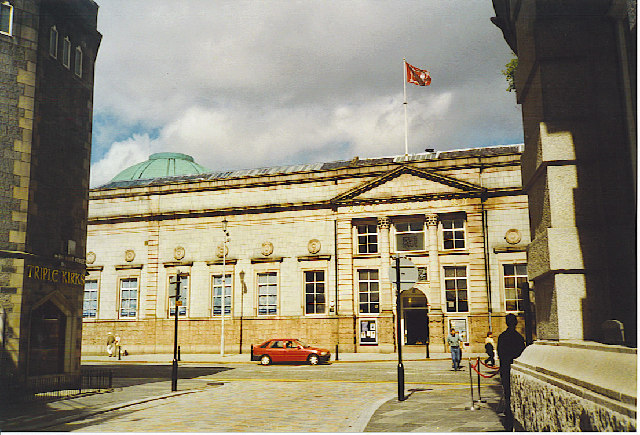
Aberdeen Art Gallery

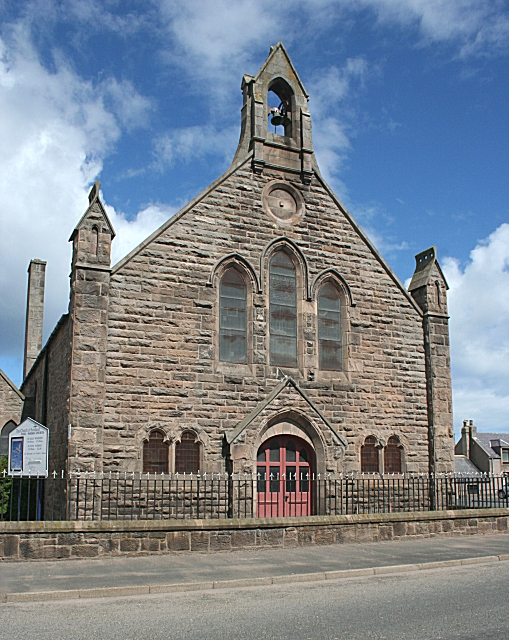
Enzie Parish Kirk

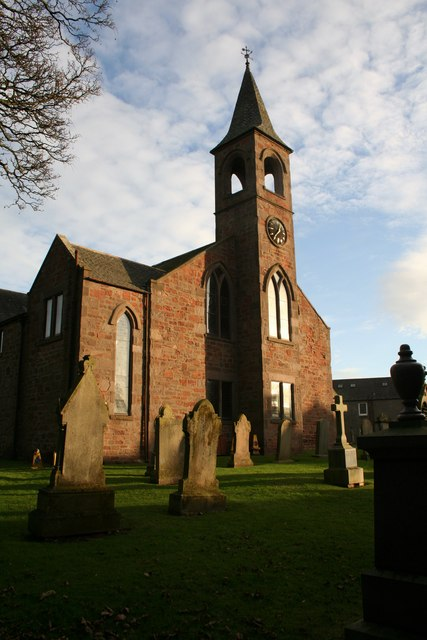
Laurencekirk kirk

He came to fame by winning the competition of the Free Church of Scotland Offices in Edinburgh but the scheme was ultimately built by William Henry Playfair. However he had many commissions thereafter including many churches.

- Milne's Free Church, Fochabers (1845)
- Leuchars House, Morayshire (1845)
- Ardross Castle (1846) work overseen by George Rhind
- Aberdeen Poorhouse (1847)
- Caledonian Bank, Inverness (1847)
- Nigg schoolhouse (1847)
- North of Scotland Bank, Dufftown (1847)
- Caledonian Bank, Nairn (1848)
- Christ Church Episcopal Church, Huntly, Aberdeenshire (1848)
- Free Church School, Nairn (1848)
- Lagmore Farmhouse, Ballindalloch (1848)
- New Market Hall, Elgin (1848)
- Nigg Manse (1848)
- Remodelling of Cawdor Castle (1848–54 and interior work in 1867) initially with MacKenzie
- Remodelling of Brucklay House, New Deer (1849)
- Culloden monument (1849- unfinished)
- Ellon Castle (1849)
- Ellon Girls School (1849)
- Ellon Poorhouse (1849)
- Feuing of Rubislaw estate (1849)
- St John's Episcopal Church, Aberdeen (1849)
- Stoneywood House, Dyce (1849)
- Aberlour School (1850)
- All Saints Episcopal Church, Whiterashes (1850)
- Remodelling of Arndilly House (1850)
- Remodelling of Ballindalloch House (1850)
- Drumtochty Castle Stables (1850)
- Gollanfield Mansion House (1850)
- Inveravon School (1850)
- Kildrummy manse (1850)
- Glenmuick manse (1850)
- Ballindalloch School (1850)
- Remodelling of Aldourie Castle (1851)
- Lodge at Culloden House (1851)
- Dess House (1851)
- Remodelling of terraces at Old Ellon Castle (1851)
- Free High Church, Inverness (1851)
- Remodelling of Lumphanan Church (1851)
- St Andrew's Masonic Hall, Banff (1851)
- St Dronstan's Episcopal Church, Old Deer (1851)
- 5 to 22 Rubislaw Terrace (1852)
- Caledonian Bank, Forres (1852)
- Lerwick manse (1852)
- Nairn United Presbyterian Church (1852)
- Stonehaven Free Church Manse (1852)
- Strathdon parish Church (1852)
- Birsay and Harray Manse, Orkney (1853)
- Elgin Railway Station Hotel (1853)
- Stenness manse, Orkney (1853)
- Fraserburgh Town House and Police Station (1853)
- Holy Trinity Episcopal School, Elgin (1853)
- Balnagask Farm, Nigg (1854)
- Fife Arms Hotel, Lhanbryde (1854)
- Inverurie manse (1854)
- Ballogie House (1855)
- Croy manse (1855)
- Monument to his partner Thomas MacKenzie, Elgin churchyard (1855)
- Remodelling of Ness Castle (1855)
- Oldmill Reformarory, Aberdeen (1855)
- Warehouse, Belmont St, Aberdeen (1855)
- Black Isle Combination Poorhouse, Fortrose (1856)
- Remodelling of Huntly manse (1856)
- Montrose Market (1856)
- Aberdeen Grammar School (1857)
- Union Bank Elgin (1857)
- Daviot Free Church, Inverness-shire (1858)
- Haughton Arms Hotel, Alford (1858)
- Mount Street Female Penitentiary, Aberdeen (1858)
- Inverness District Asylum and Inverness Poorhouse (1859)
- Kingswells Free School (1859)
- Mechanics Institute, Elgin (1859)
- Royal Marine hotel, Elgin (1859)
- Kincardine O Neil Parish Church (1860)
- Nairn Poorhouse (1860)
- Brown's School Aberdeen (1861)
- Chalmers School, Turiff (1861)
- Tulloch House, Old Meldrum (1861)
- Dunmaglass Shooting Lodge (1862)
- Fraserburgh manse (1862)
- Glenaffric Hotel, Cannich (1862)
- Remodelling of Rothie House (1862)
- Bank of Scotland Inverness (1863)
- Remodelling of Cushnie House (1863)
- West Free Church Inverness (1863)
- Ythanwells Church (1863)
- Remodelling of Aldourie Castle (1863)
- Brotherstone House, Fordoun (1864)
- Kingussie Courthouse (1864)
- Caledonian Bank Granton-on-Spey (1865)
- Remodelling of MacDuff Parish Church (1865)
- Portree Sheriff Court (1865)
- Strachan Parish Church (1865)
- Aberdeen and County Bank, Fyvie (1866)
- Free Church, New Aberdour (1866)
- Remodelling of Montquhitter Parish Church (1866)
- West Free Church, Aberdeen (1867)
- Duisdale House, Skye (1867)
- Remodelling of Monboddo House, Fordoun (1867)
- Tomnacross School, Kiltarlity (1867)
- Banff County Buildings and Courthouse (1868)
- Fasnakyle Free Church (1868)
- Congregational Church, Avoch (1868)
- Inverness Dispensary (1868)
- North of Scotland Bank, MacDuff (1868)
- North of Scotland Bank, Montrose (1868)
- St Andrew's Episcopal Church, Alford, Aberdeenshire (1868)
- St Fergus Parish Church (1868)
- Advocates Hall, Concert Court, Aberdeen (1869)
- Congregational Church, Peterhead (1869)
- Dyce Free Church (1869)
- Insch Public Hall (1869)
- Inverness Markert and Arcade (1869)
- St Joseph's RC School, Inverness (1869)
- Remodelling of Advocates Hall, Aberdeen (1870)
- St Margaret of Scotland Episcopal Church, Gallowgate, Aberdeen (1870)
- Remodelling of Dochfour House (1871)
- Dyce Parish Church (1871)
- Glenmillan House (1871)
- Lovat Arms Hotel, Beauly (1871)
- Masonic Hall, Aberdeen (1871)
- Her Majesty's Theatre, Aberdeen (1872)
- High Pavement Church, Nottingham (1873)
- Disblair School (1874)
- Ellon School (1874)
- Kingussie School (1874)
- Knaven School (1874)
- Oldwhat School (1874)
- Beauly School (1875)
- Caledonian Bank, Kingussie (1875)
- Cannich Bridge School (1875)
- Dyce School (1875)
- Gallowgate School, Aberdeen (1875)
- Inverness Town House (1875)
- Lochmaddy Sheriff Court (1875)
- Markinch School (1875)
- North of Scotland Bank, Stonehaven (1875)
- North of Scotland Bank, Methlick (1875)
- New House of Glack (1875)
- Ruthrieston Free Church (1875)
- YMCA Hall, Aberdeen (1875)
- Duthil School (1876)
- Invermoriston School (1876)
- Pitmedden House (1876)
- Fort William Sheriff Court (1876)
- Urquhart School, Drumnadrochit (1876)
- Kirkcaldy Free Church (1876)
- Algas House (1877)
- Ardoe House (1877)
- Caledonian House, Lochmaddy (1877)
- Congregational Church, Aberfeldy (1877)
- Cromdale School (1877)
- Crubenmore Shooting Lodge (1877)
- Beauly Free Church (1877)
- Kingussie Free Church (1877)
- Oakbank School, Aberdeen (1877)
- St Margaret's Episcopal Church, Leven, Fife (1877)
- Stonehaven Town Hall (1877)
- Trinity Congregational Church, Aberdeen (1877)
- Remodelling of Braemar Parish Church (1878)
- Braes Free Church (1878)
- Gairloch Free Church (1878)
- St Drostan's Episcopal Church, Tarfside (1878)
- St Machar's Episcopal Church, Aberdeen (1878)
- Leochel Cushnie Church (1879)
- Central School Fraserburgh (1880)
- New Deer Congragational Church (1880)
- St James Church, Lossiemouth (1880)
- Craigiebuckler Church (1882)
- Reconstruction of Inglismaldie Castle following fire (1882)
- St Clement's Free Church, Aberdeen (1882)
- Aberdeen Art Gallery (1883)
- Enzie Parish Church (1886)
- Crathie manse (1892)
- Remodelling Laurencekirk Parish Church (1894)

Civic offices
Preceded by Peter Esslemont	Lord Provost of Aberdeen; 1883–1886	Succeeded by William Henderson
