= Stonehaven Town Hall =

Municipal building in Stonehaven, Scotland

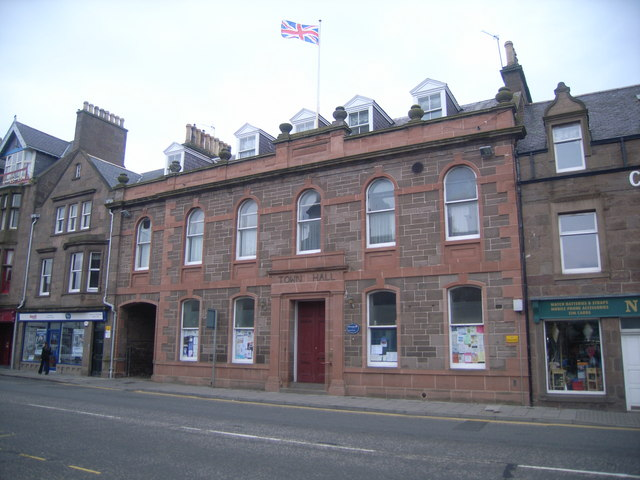
- Stonehaven Town Hall

- Shown in Aberdeenshire
- 56.9640°N 2.2080°W
- Location: Allardice Street, Stonehaven

History
- Built: 1878

Site notes
- Architect(s): James Matthews and William Lawrie
- Architectural style: Renaissance style

Listed Building – Category B
- Official name: Town Hall, 32-36 Allardice Street, Stonehaven
- Designated: 25 November 1980
- Reference no.: LB41534

Stonehaven Town Hall is a municipal building in Allardice Street, Stonehaven, Aberdeenshire, Scotland. The building, which is largely used as an events venue, is a Category B listed building.

== History ==
The first municipal building in Stonehaven was the Stonehaven Tolbooth which was erected on the old pier in the late 16th century. It was used as a county courthouse for the county of Kincardineshire but, after a new county courthouse was established in Dunnottar Avenue in 1767, it became a storehouse. A new town house was erected by public subscription in the High Street, a short distance to the west of the tolbooth, in 1790.

In the 19th century the focus of development moved north of the Carron Water to what became known as the "New Town": the market buildings were built on the west side of Allardice Street and completed in 1827. In the 1870s the burgh leaders decided to commission a dedicated civic events venue for the town: the site they selected was on the east side of Allardice Street facing the market buildings. The new building was designed by James Matthews and William Lawrie in the Renaissance style, built in rubble masonry at a cost of £4,000 and was officially opened on 7 May 1878. The design involved a symmetrical main frontage with five bays facing onto Allardice Street together with an additional recessed bay on the left which featured an arched carriageway on the ground floor; the central bay featured a doorway flanked by pilasters supporting an entablature and a frieze inscribed with the words "Town Hall". The first floor was fenestrated with round headed sash windows in all the bays including the recessed bay. At roof level there was a cornice, a parapet and a central panel inscribed with the date of construction and, behind the parapet, there were also five dormer windows. Internally, the principal rooms were the assembly hall, a billiard room and a reading room.

The building was used as an events venue from an early stage: the showman, Walford Bodie, conducted his first public performance of hypnosis, ventriloquism and magic in the town hall, at the age of 15, in 1884. The market buildings and the town hall were transferred to an elected board of trustees, who held the properties for the benefit of the burgh, in 1901, shortly before the town hall was altered to a design by Duncan McMillan and John Ross McMillan in 1903. Although the town hall was used as a venue for civic events, burgh council officers and their staff were located in offices in Cameron Street. Concert performers included the contralto singer, Kathleen Ferrier, who made an appearance on 4 April 1943.

In summer 1975, an annual art exhibition was instituted in the town hall, involving artists from all over the north-east of Scotland. The community-run radio station, Mearns FM, was based at the town hall from its inception in 2007 until late 2019: after broadcasting from temporary studios, the station moved permanently to a new studio on Ann Street on 13 September 2020.

== See also ==
- List of listed buildings in Stonehaven, Aberdeenshire
