= Dalyrmple Hall =

Listed building in Fraserburgh, Scotland

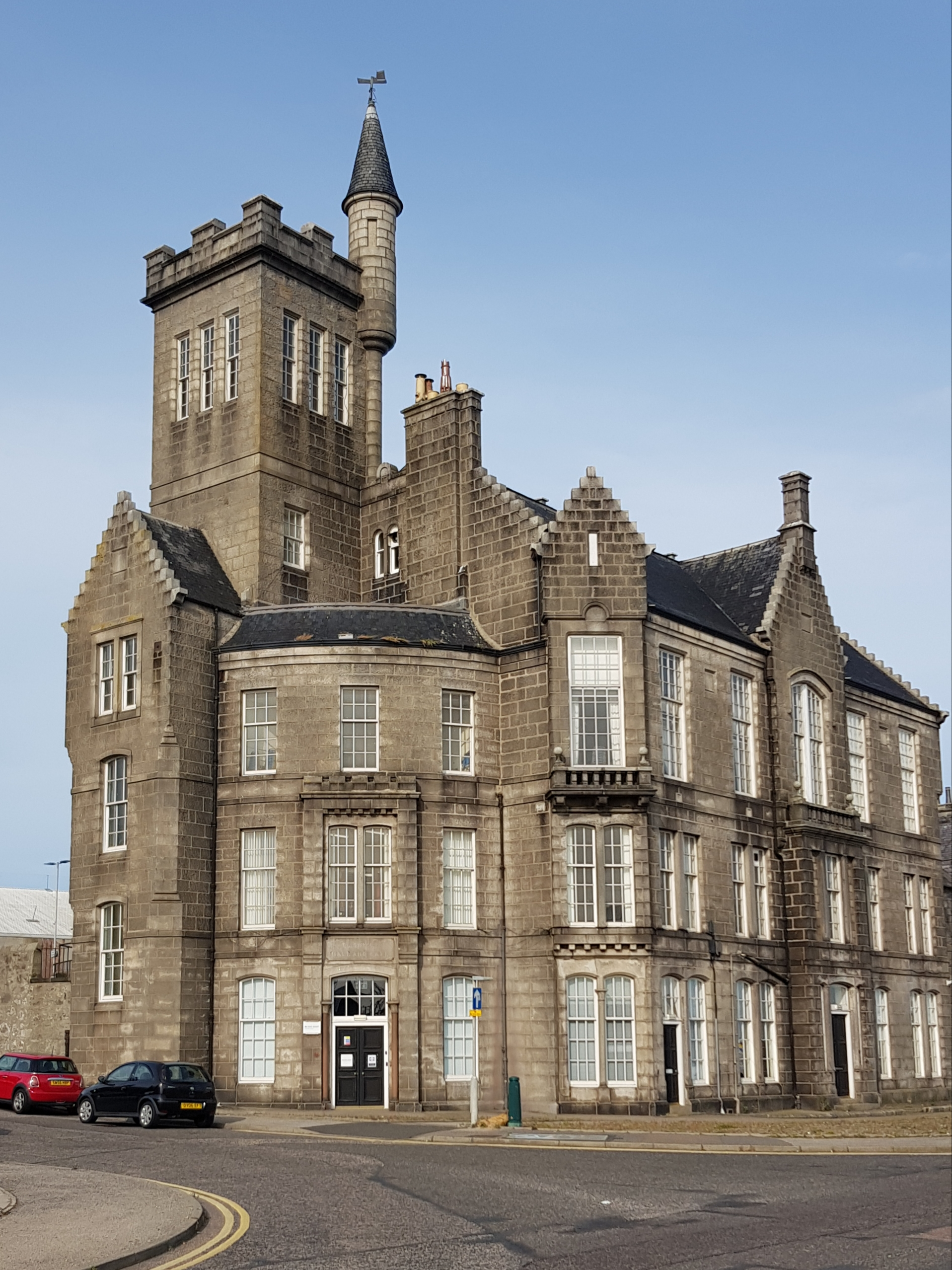
- The building in 2020

- Shown in Aberdeenshire
- 57.69072°N 2.004012°W
- Location: Dalyrmple Street, Fraserburgh

History
- Built: 1881 (145 years ago)

Site notes
- Architect: Jenkins & Marr
- Architectural style: Scottish baronial

Listed Building – Category C(S)
- Official name: DALYRMPLE HALL AND CAFE DALRYMPLE STREET
- Designated: 15 February 1982
- Reference no.: LB31881

Dalyrmple Hall is a building in Fraserburgh, Scotland, standing on Dalyrmple Street at its junction with Station Brae. Category C listed, in the Scottish baronial style, it dates to 1881. Its architects were Aberdeen-based Jenkins & Marr.

The building's prominent feature is its five-storey tower, extended in angular glass.

== See also ==
- List of listed buildings in Fraserburgh, Aberdeenshire
