= List of listed buildings in Portree, Highland =

This is a list of listed buildings in the parish of Portree in Highland, Scotland.

== List ==
| Name | Location | Date listed | Geo-coordinates | Notes | Category | LB number | Image |
|---|---|---|---|---|---|---|---|
| Bosville Terrace Kings Haven Hotel | | | 57°24′47″N 6°11′31″W | | C(S) | 13915 | Upload Photo |
| Scorrybreck Road Redcliffe | | | 57°24′53″N 6°11′20″W | | C(S) | 13920 | Upload another image |
| Stormy Hill Hill House | | | 57°24′49″N 6°11′33″W | | B | 13927 | Upload Photo |
| Stormy Hill Cottage At Angle With Coolin Drive | | | 57°24′50″N 6°11′34″W | | C(S) | 13928 | Upload Photo |
| Raasay House | Raasay | | 57°21′14″N 6°04′44″W | | A | 13932 | Upload another image See more images |
| Salmon Netting Station | | | 57°24′40″N 6°11′40″W | | B | 18978 | Upload Photo |
| 12.5 Camastianavaig | | | 57°22′20″N 6°09′00″W | | C(S) | 18446 | Upload Photo |
| Island of Rona Lighthouse | Rona | | 57°34′42″N 5°57′34″W | | B | 18449 | Upload another image See more images |
| Raasay Free Church | Raasay | | 57°21′03″N 6°03′47″W | | B | 13912 | Upload another image See more images |
| Mill Road, Mill Cottage And Disused Mill | | | 57°24′53″N 6°11′23″W | | C(S) | 13916 | Upload Photo |
| Portree House | | | 57°24′59″N 6°11′56″W | | B | 13918 | Upload Photo |
| Somerled Square Bank Of Scotland | | | 57°24′48″N 6°11′43″W | | B | 13925 | Upload Photo |
| 6 Beaumont Crescent | | | 57°24′46″N 6°11′30″W | | C(S) | 13914 | Upload another image |
| Raasay House Mains Including Top Barn And Kennels | | | 57°21′10″N 6°04′34″W | | B | 13934 | Upload another image |
| 4 And 5 Beaumont Crescent | | | 57°24′45″N 6°11′31″W | | C(S) | 13913 | Upload another image |
| 27 Viewfield Square, Braedownie | | | 57°24′46″N 6°12′17″W | | C(S) | 13931 | Upload Photo |
| Camastianavaig Dan Sleigh's Cottage | | | 57°22′18″N 6°08′48″W | | C(S) | 13935 | Upload Photo |
| Portree Bank Street, Old Jail | | | 57°24′42″N 6°11′32″W | | B | 13936 | Upload Photo |
| Raasay St Moluag's Chapel | Raasay | | 57°21′14″N 6°04′39″W | | B | 13911 | Upload Photo |
| Quay Street Ice House | | | 57°24′37″N 6°11′28″W | | B | 13919 | Upload another image |
| Stormy Hill, Talamh Aig Am Bothan | | | 57°24′50″N 6°11′35″W | | C(S) | 45639 | Upload Photo |
| Raasay, Free Church Manse | Raasay | | 57°21′08″N 6°03′51″W | | C(S) | 18447 | Upload another image |
| Park Road Episcopal Church | | | 57°24′50″N 6°11′46″W | | C(S) | 13917 | Upload Photo |
| Somerled Square War Memorial | | | 57°24′47″N 6°11′40″W | | B | 13926 | Upload another image See more images |
| Viewfield Square Heath Cottage | | | 57°24′49″N 6°12′20″W | | C(S) | 13930 | Upload Photo |
| Raasay, Inverarish Mill | Raasay | | 57°20′46″N 6°03′58″W | | B | 18448 | Upload Photo |
| Scorrybreck Road Scorrybreck | | | 57°24′55″N 6°11′14″W | | C(S) | 13921 | Upload Photo |
| Somerled Square Clydesdale Bank | | | 57°24′47″N 6°11′45″W | | B | 13924 | Upload Photo |
| Raasay House Gardener's Cottage | Raasay | | 57°21′16″N 6°04′43″W | | C(S) | 13933 | Upload another image |
| Bank Street Former Parish Church | | | 57°24′43″N 6°11′34″W | | C(S) | 13937 | Upload Photo |
| Varragil, Varragil River Bridge | | | 57°22′37″N 6°11′45″W | | B | 18450 | Upload another image |
| Seafield House | | | 57°24′40″N 6°11′53″W | | B | 13922 | Upload another image |
| Somerled Square Courthouse | | | 57°24′46″N 6°11′42″W | | B | 13923 | Upload another image See more images |
| Viewfield House | | | 57°24′28″N 6°12′13″W | | C(S) | 13929 | Upload another image See more images |

== Key ==
The scheme for classifying buildings in Scotland is:

- Category A: "buildings of national or international importance, either architectural or historic; or fine, little-altered examples of some particular period, style or building type."
- Category B: "buildings of regional or more than local importance; or major examples of some particular period, style or building type, which may have been altered."
- Category C: "buildings of local importance; lesser examples of any period, style, or building type, as originally constructed or moderately altered; and simple traditional buildings which group well with other listed buildings."

In March 2016 there were 47,288 listed buildings in Scotland. Of these, 8% were Category A, and 50% were Category B, with the remaining 42% being Category C.

== See also ==
- List of listed buildings in Highland
