= Stonehaven Sheriff Court =

Judicial building in Stonehaven, Scotland

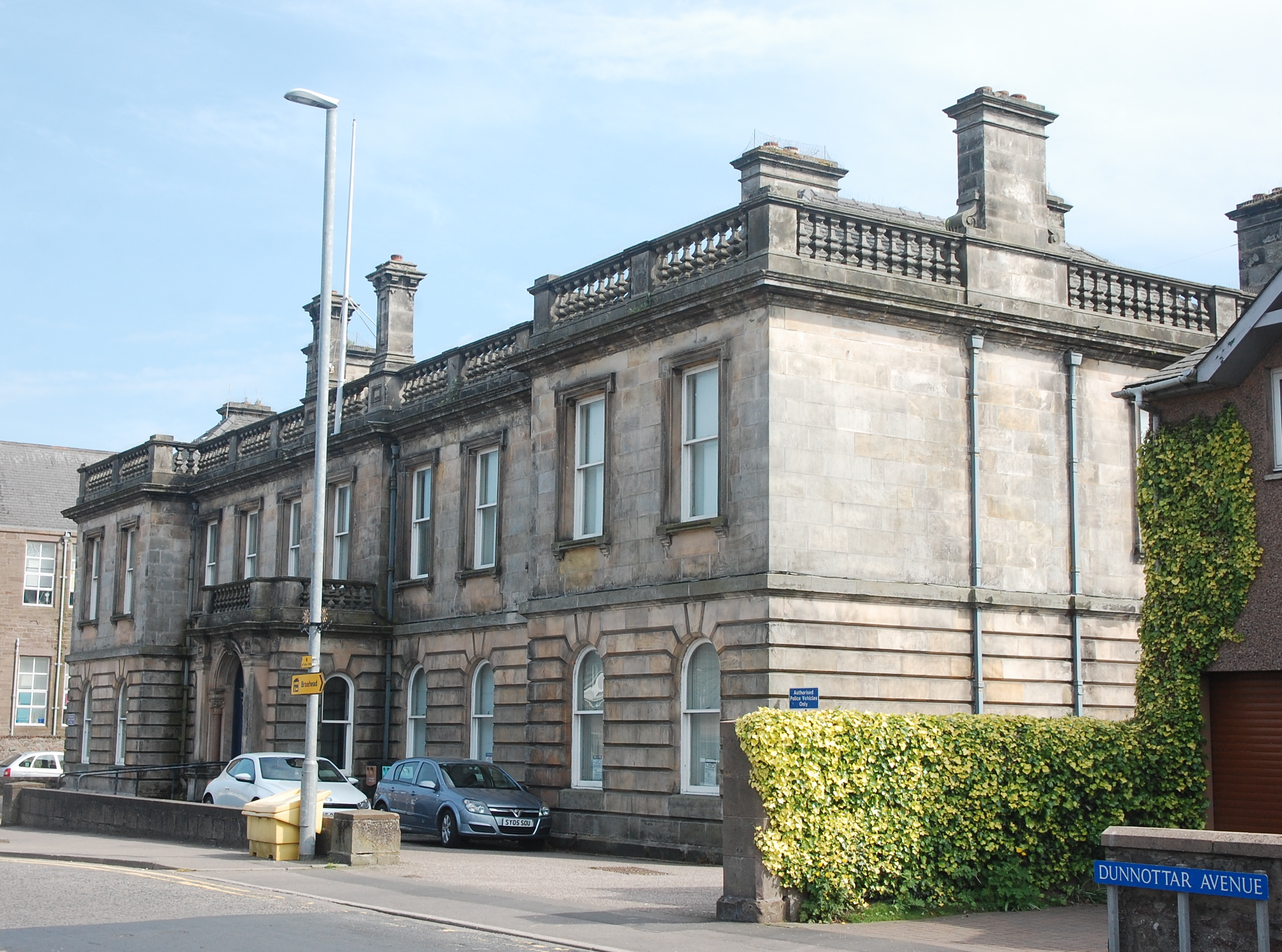
- Stonehaven Sheriff Court

- Shown in Aberdeenshire
- 56.9614°N 2.2086°W
- Location: Dunnottar Avenue, Stonehaven

History
- Built: 1865

Site notes
- Architect: James Campbell Walker
- Architectural style: Neoclassical style

Listed Building – Category B
- Official name: Stonehaven Sheriff Court House and Police Station, including boundary walls, Dunnottar Avenue, Bogwell Lane, Stonehaven
- Designated: 18 August 1972
- Reference no.: LB41617

Stonehaven Sheriff Court, formerly known as County Buildings, is a judicial structure in Dunnottar Avenue, Stonehaven, Aberdeenshire, Scotland. The structure, which was used as the headquarters of Kincardineshire County Council as well as a courthouse, is a Category B listed building.

== History ==
After sheriff court hearings were transferred from Kincardine to Stonehaven in 1660, judicial proceedings were initially held in the Stonehaven Tolbooth which had been erected on the old pier in the late 16th century. However, in the early 1760s, the Commissioners of Supply decided to commission a dedicated courthouse for the county of Kincardineshire: the site they selected was in Dunnottar Avenue in the "Auld Toon" part of Stonehaven. The new building was completed in 1767 and expanded in 1788.

The courthouse was rebuilt, incorporating elements of the earlier structure including three prison cells, to a design by James Campbell Walker in the neoclassical style and it re-opened in 1865. The design involved a symmetrical main frontage of eleven bays facing Dunnottar Avenue, with the end two bays on either side slighted projected forward. The central bay, which also slightly projected forward, featured a portico which was formed by a round headed opening with colonnettes and a carved keystone, flanked by pilasters supporting a balustrade. The ground floor, which was rusticated, was fenestrated by round headed windows, while the first floor was fenestrated by square headed sash windows. At roof level, there was a balustraded parapet. Internally, the principal room was the main courtroom on the first floor.

Following the implementation of the Local Government (Scotland) Act 1889, which established county councils in every county, the new county leaders needed to identify a meeting place for Kincardineshire County Council and decided to use the courthouse for that purpose. Additional offices in Evan Street were acquired in around 1920.

In 1930, the county council absorbed the functions of the abolished county education authority, which had been based at offices in a converted house called Viewmount on Arduthie Road in Stonehaven. Viewmount burnt down in January 1932, and the county council took the opportunity to reconstruct and extend it to become a new headquarters, including a council chamber. The rebuilt Viewmount opened as the county council's meeting place and main offices in May 1935.

The sheriff court then reverted to being purely a judicial building. It was used for hearings of the sheriff's court and, on one day a month, for hearings of the justice of the peace court until the court hearings were transferred to Aberdeen in 2015. Ownership of the building was transferred to the Stonehaven Town Partnership for a nominal sum in May 2018. The Stonehaven Town Partnership subsequently initiated refurbishment works to the building costing £150,000.

== See also ==
- List of listed buildings in Stonehaven, Aberdeenshire
