= Walford Bodie =

Scottish showman

- Photograph of Bodie c. 1900s
- Born: Samuel Murphy Bodie; 11 June 1869; Aberdeen, Scotland
- Died: 19 October 1939 (aged 70); Blackpool, England
- Burial place: Macduff, Aberdeenshire, Scotland

Walford Bodie (born Samuel Murphy Bodie; 11 June 1869 – 19 October 1939), was a Scottish showman, hypnotist, ventriloquist and stage magician, famous for his "mock" electrocutions involving a replica of "The Electric Chair". He also performed an act of "Bloodless Surgery", claiming he could use electricity, hypnosis and manipulation to cure "all kinds of ailments and disabilities". His performances were enormously popular in the early 20th century, and inspired both Harry Houdini and Charlie Chaplin.

His touting of medical skill displeased the medical profession of the time, who labelled him a 'quack,' and took him to court over his use of the title 'doctor.' Yet Bodie was also a great showman and stage performer, and it was the combination of showmanship, as well as his apparent 'cures,' that led to his huge success. Rick Jay accredits Bodie with the origination of comic interludes, or 'humorous hypnosis', still used in modern stage hypnotism, while Professor Edwin A. Dawes states that 'as a ventriloquist (in his later stage review, 'Fun on an Ocean Liner') he was superb.'

== Family ==
The son of William Walford Bodie (1831-1888), and Margaret Bodie (1839-1913), née Murphy, Samuel Murphy Bodie was born at 33 George Street, Aberdeen, Scotland, on 11 June 1869. He was educated at Robert Gordon's College, Aberdeen.

Bodie was married twice:

- He married Jeannie Henry, the eldest of eight talented sisters, and the second eldest in a family of eleven, in Aberdeen, on 25 April 1888. They had three children: Albert Edward Walford Bodie (1889-1915), Jeannie Rubie Bodie, (1890-1909), and Samuel Murphy Walford Bodie (1896–1974), who became Samuel Murphy Walford Bodie, M.B., Ch.B., the (genuine) anaesthetist.
- He married an attractive 22-year-old showgirl, Florence Jean "La Tesla" Robertshaw (1910–1987) in London in March 1932.

== Early life ==
At the age of 14, he became an apprentice at The National Telephone Company, something that would impact on his later career choice. Two years afterwards, he began performing live at places like Stonehaven Town Hall in Kincardineshire. During this time, he would build his reputation, performing acts that involved illusions, ventriloquism, hypnotism and other magic tricks.

== Career ==
=== 'The Electrical Wizard' ===
Before long, the young Bodie began experimenting with electricity in his shows, and touring the British Music Hall circuit, building up his reputation as the 'Electrical Wizard' and the 'British Edison'; his performances often using an electric chair to shock members of the audience with static electrical charges which, despite the appearance that horrified audiences, posed no type of lethal threat.

At the climax of the act, Bodie would strap himself in, assisted by 'La Belle Electra', his assistant, and seemingly pass 30,000 volts through his body, lighting up sixteen light bulbs and even two lamps he held in his hands. In 1920, his friend Harry Houdini would gift him the real Electric chair, used in the first execution at Sing Sing Prison. Bodie and Houdini were firm friends for many years. Numerous letters were exchanged between the two. Charlie Chaplin imitated Bodie on stage in 1906, and continued to do so in Hollywood years later.

=== 'Bloodless surgery' ===
Bodie became one of the world's highest paid entertainers. His 'Show Cures,' performed as part of his 'Bloodless Surgery', had brought him popularity.

In regard to the bloodless surgery which I employ, I rely for success first upon a knowledge of the exact articulations of the bone, secondly upon a very acute "muscular sense", and last upon strength of the hand, and especially of the thumb.
There is no occult art in bloodless surgery, but there is an art, and it is very difficult to master.
While I am holding the stiffened joint in my hand and talking to the audience, I am ascertaining the relative position of everything beneath the skin, including the adhesions, and calculating the angle at which to apply force.
Then the wrench is a matter of a moment.
Apply the force at the wrong angle and there is a risk of rupturing some of the muscular fibres attached to the bones and of straining the tissues in such a way that subcutaneous hemorrhage ensues.
I have never produced results of this kind, as I never apply force to a stiffened joint until I have calculated fully the exact way in which to apply it.
Sometimes it takes me two or three minutes to arrive at this, and the audience begin to wonder why I have so much to say while holding the limb in my hands.
It is simply to fill in the time while I am deciding how to act.
Bloodless Surgery, although very important as a protest against the use of the knife, is merely a preliminary step before proceeding to awaken life in the paralysed limb.
It cannot be considered as an essential part of my process.
Suggestion and Hypnotic Suggestion, however, are essential.
The stage itself, the music, the subdued light, the electrical apparatus — all are suggestions which tend to induce in the patient the mental attitude of belief, without which I should struggle with the disease in vain.
Later, having put the patient to sleep, I employ Hypnotic Suggestion to initiate the cure, and, finally coming into magnetic touch, I use Mental Suggestion to consummate it.
In short, my method of cure may be summed up in this: I employ Electricity to awake my patients' vital forces; Hypnotism to allay their pain; but it is by Mental Suggestion that I direct Nature to the cure.

Bodie advertised freely; his show posters even including the invitation 'Send Your Cripples.' In 1905, his 'cures' had made him so famous that he was made a 'Freeman of the City of London,' the first of his kind to receive such an honour. From this, he made his fortune, set up his 'Bodie Electric Drug Co,' and published books

== Trials ==
Lithograph of 1909 trial

Despite his success, including his The Bodie Book (1905), Bodie's popularity was not met entirely with open arms. His 'cures' and the self-imposed title of 'Doctor' (or M.D.) angered members of the medical profession, and in 1905 he was taken to court for the use of the suffix 'M.D' by the Medical Defence Union. Bodie claimed that he had inadvertently left off the suffix 'USA' and was given a slap over the wrist. What he didn't tell the court, though, was that he'd purchased his 'USA doctorate' from a dentist in Bradford. In the 1906 'Leeds Court Case,' Justice Grantham summed up in his favour, as follows (in part):

'Perhaps his methods might not suit the taste of all – and it was well known that doctors were jealous people – but we have evidence of cases where doctors have failed, and which have been cured by Doctor Bodie's treatment. There was no doubt that he (Doctor Bodie) had done a great deal of good. He could not be stigmatised as a 'quack' or an impostor.'

In 1909, he was sued by a former 'principal assistant,' Charles Irving, for alleged misrepresentation. Ever the showman, Bodie claimed that the initials 'M.D.' did not stand for a medical title, but rather the nickname 'Merry Devil', a term which would stick to him.

Bodie lost the legal battle, and was forced to pay £1000 in compensation. His colourful 'Great Bodie Trial' poster (see right), produced after the trial, was strikingly similar to Harry Houdini's 1902 'German Court' poster. In another similarity, in 1916, his ship was torpedoed and sunk on the way back from the Middle East, where he'd also followed in the footsteps of Harry Houdini.

=== Riots ===
A week after the 'Great Bodie Trial', at the instigation of the medical profession, and under the leadership of Philip Figdor, his reputation was forever tarnished when one thousand students rioted at his performance in the Glasgow Coliseum. Bodie was pelted with eggs and rotten food by the students, who chanted 'Bodie, Bodie, Quack, Quack, Quack' as he stood his ground, before hurriedly departing the stage as police attempted to hold back the now-uncontrollable mob.

Three days later, a mob of angry students attacked Bodie's London premises, after burning his effigy in the street, and assaulting police to gain entry. The riots have been described as the worst student riots in Scottish history.

== Rebound, final years and death ==
Bodie was devastated by the riots. He was forced to take a year off to recover, write books, and reinvent his act. He made a recovery of sorts in 1912, when he outdrew the great Harry Lauder in Aberdeen, and held his own until the 1920s, when his now variety-based 'Bodie Show' began to take root again. In the early 1930s, Bodie owned a London nightclub, and a houseboat (his 'floating palace'), which he named 'La Belle Electra.' He and his second wife were said to entertain lavishly, and the guest list was said to include the future king, Edward VIII, and his fiancée, Wallis Simpson. The mid-1930s depression, however, told a different story, when Bodie was forced to perform at smaller venues.

In 1939, Bodie collapsed on stage, and subsequently died on 19 October 1939, at the age of 70, after the end of a season at the Blackpool Pleasure Beach. His body was returned to and buried in Macduff, Aberdeenshire, Scotland.

== Legacy ==
- In the Florence Tudor articles, from the 1970s, published in 'The Scotsman,' the preface reads:- 'Some believe that he was a charlatan, but Florence Tudor defends his reputation, and claims that, as well as a superb showman, he was a pioneer of medical techniques.' Florence Tudor goes on to describe Bodie as a 'misunderstood genius.'
- In 2005 a book was published, "Showmen or Charlatans?" by Roger Woods & Brian Lead, that detailed Bodie's exploits.
- A Wetherspoons pub in Morpeth, Northumberland, is named "The Electrical Wizard" after Bodie.
