= William Henderson (philanthropist) =

Sir William Henderson (10 April 1826 – 9 June 1904) was a Scottish merchant and philanthropist. He served as Lord provost of Aberdeen from 1886 to 1889.

== Life ==
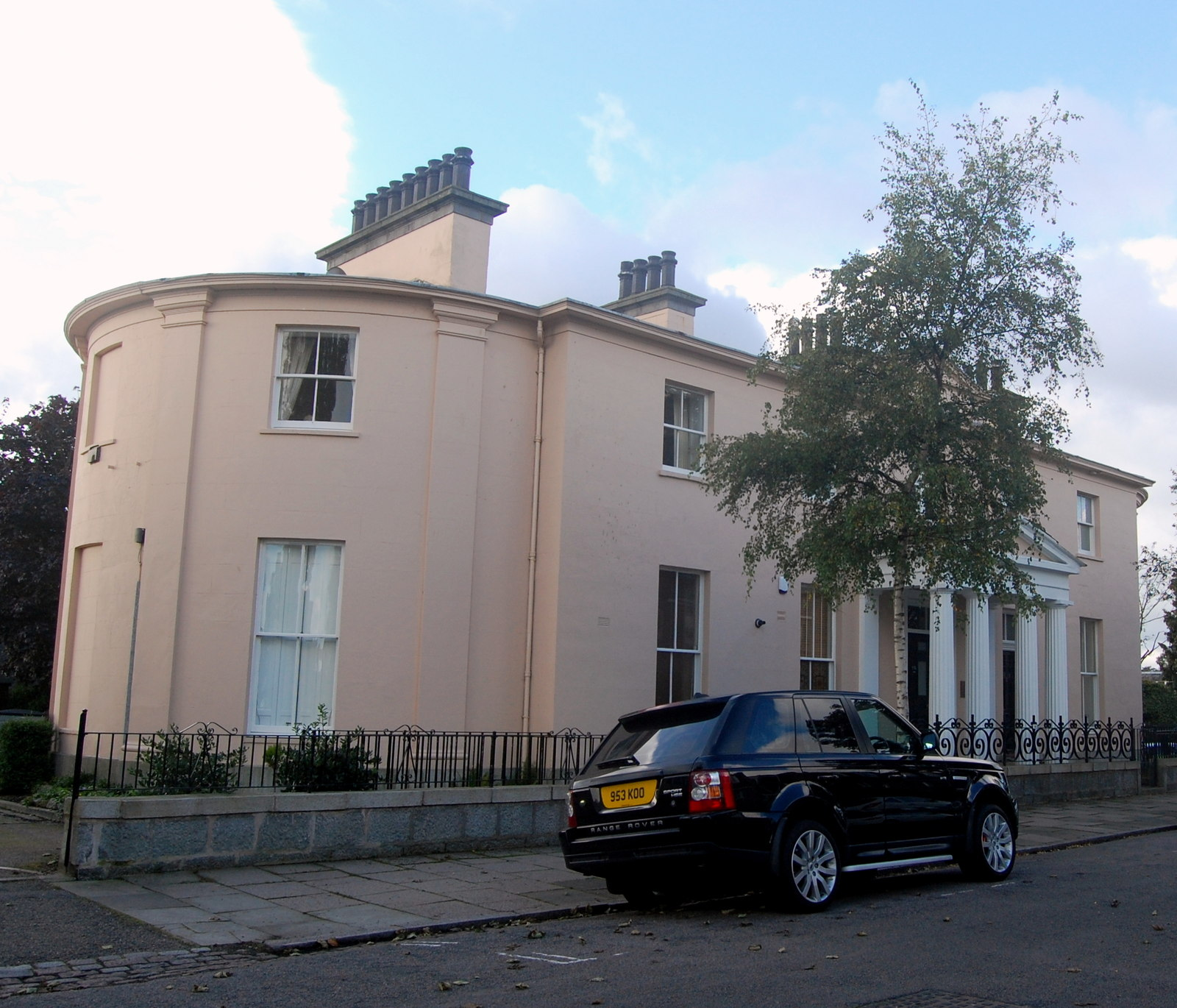
Devanah House, Ferryhill, Aberdeen

Henderson was born in Aberdour, Aberdeenshire, the son of a farmer, and his first job was a junior position in the Fraserburgh branch of the North of Scotland Bank. However, he soon moved to Aberdeen to work for the Aberdeen White Star Line, founded in 1825 by George Thompson, a ship-owning company whose fleet of Aberdeen clippers included the Thermopylae. He travelled widely on the firm's business, and in 1886 he became senior partner of the firm, on the retirement of George Thompson. This was a time of great change as sailing ships were replaced by steamships.

Henderson entered Aberdeen Town Council in 1885, and in November 1886 was elected Lord Provost in succession to James Matthews, serving until 1889. While on the council, he was instrumental in causing the rebuilding of the Royal Infirmary to commemorate Queen Victoria's jubilee in 1887, and the erection of the Public Library buildings on Rosemount Viaduct. Politically, he was a Liberal. On his retirement as Lord Provost, he was appointed a deputy lieutenant of Aberdeen.

Henderson was an active member of the Free Church of Scotland, and involved in many philanthropical endeavours. He was knighted in Queen Victoria's 1893 Birthday Honours. In 1895 he was awarded an honorary degree of LL.D. by Aberdeen University.

== Family ==
In 1852, he married a daughter of George Thompson; they had 5 sons and 5 daughters. From 1857 they resided at Devanha House (now a listed building.

Civic offices
Preceded by James Matthews	Lord Provost of Aberdeen; 1886–1889	Succeeded by David Stewart
