= The World's End, Fraserburgh =

Building in Scotland

The World's End
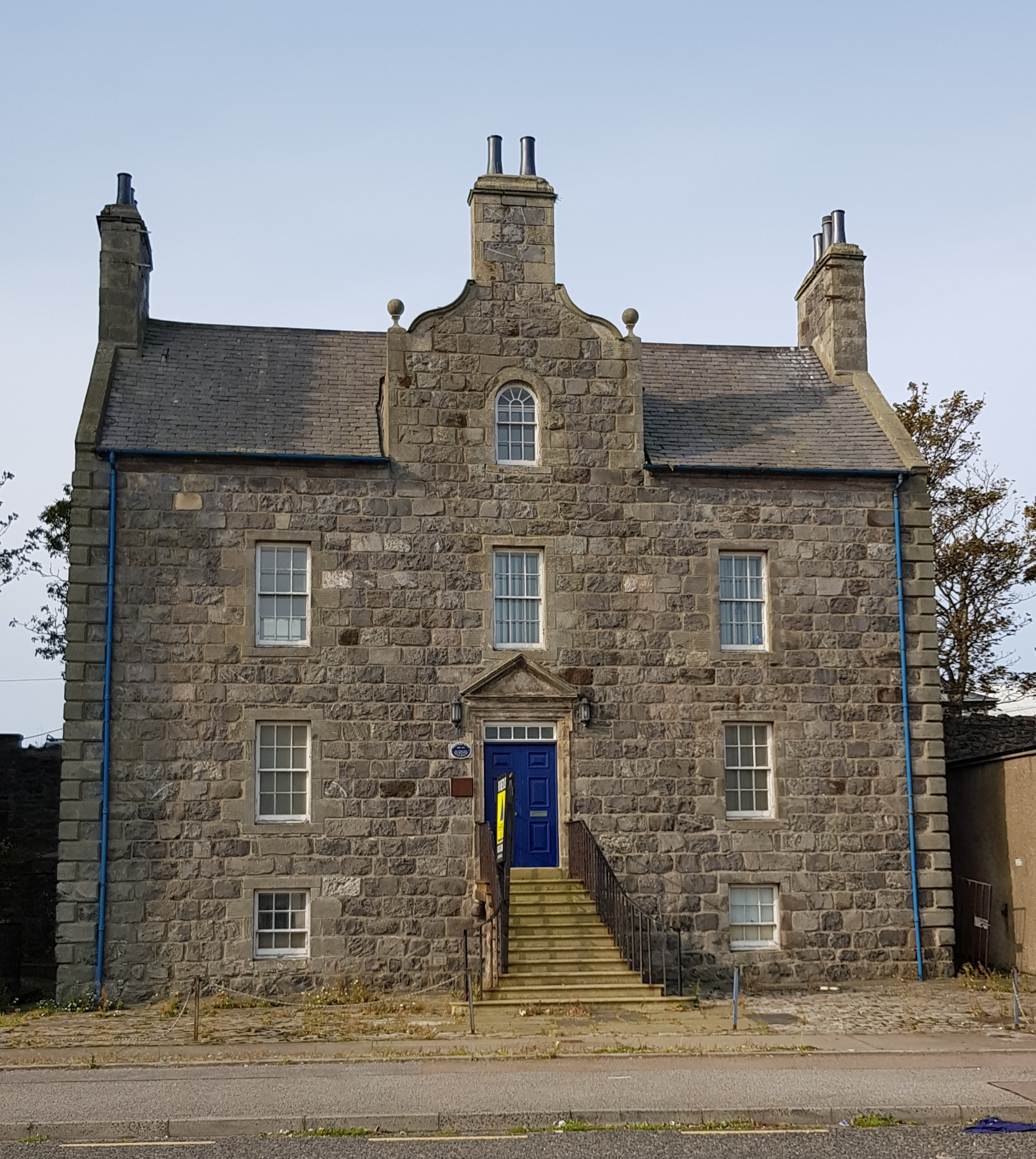
- The building in 2020

- Shown in Aberdeenshire
- 57.690927°N 2.004062°W
- Location: 11 Dalyrmple Street, Fraserburgh

History
- Built: c. 1767 (259 years ago)

Listed Building – Category B
- Official name: The World's End 11 Dalrymple Street
- Designated: 16 April 1971
- Reference no.: LB31880

The World's End is an historic townhouse in Fraserburgh, Scotland, standing on Dalyrmple Street. Category B listed, it dates to around 1767.

The structure is two storeys and basement, constructed of squared heathen stone with freestone dressings and quoins. It has a shaped Dutch gable with an arched window and ball finials. Steps lead up to a pedimented door piece. A wooden porch present in the 1970s has since been removed.

The building's first known owner was Charles Gordon in 1766. It also once belonged to the Gordons of Glenbuchat (or Glenbucket). Alexander Forbes, 4th Lord Forbes of Pitsligo, hid here after the Battle of Culloden.

== See also ==
- List of listed buildings in Fraserburgh, Aberdeenshire
