= David Stewart of Banchory =

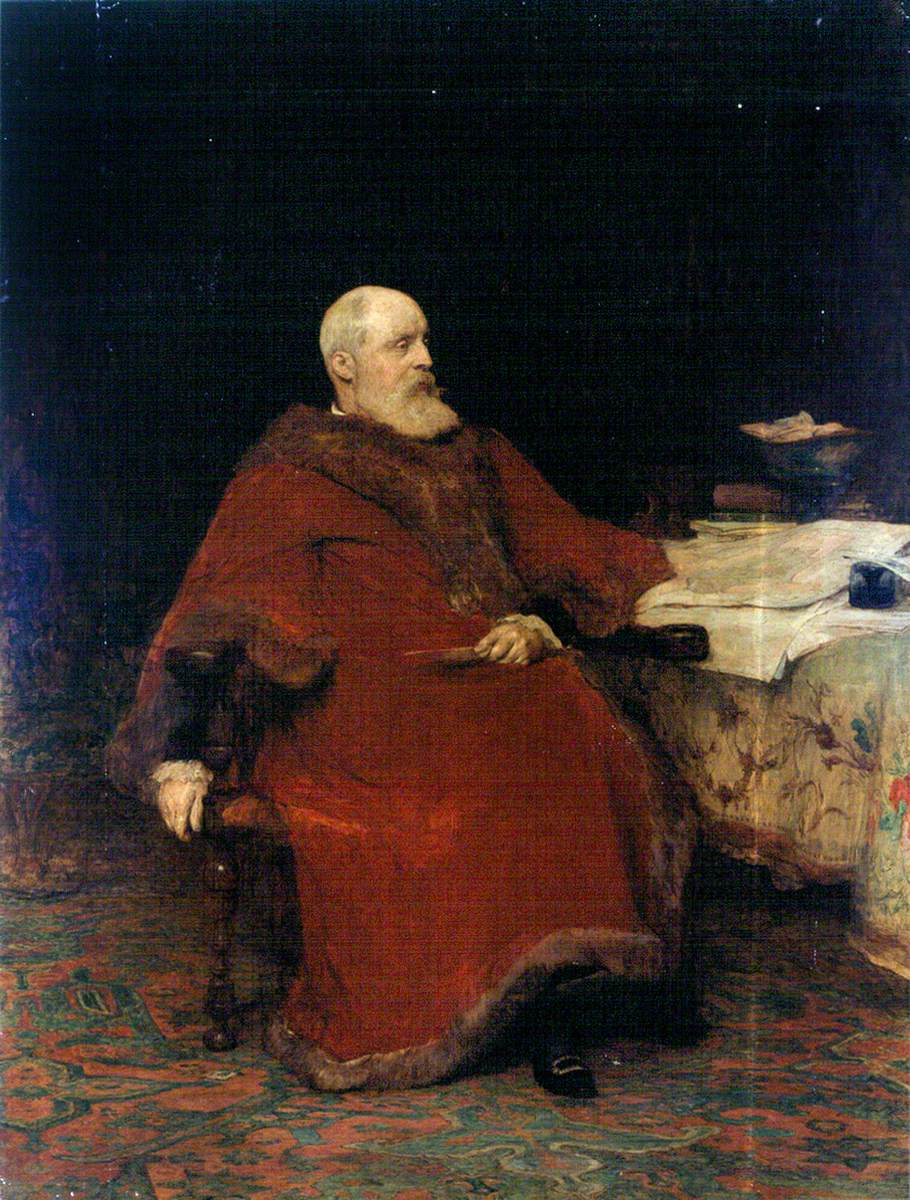
Sir David Stewart by William Quiller Orchardson

Sir David Stewart K.T., M.A., LL.D, D.L. (1835-1919) was chairman of the Great North of Scotland Railway from 1904 until 1919.

== Life ==
He was born in 1835, the eldest son of John Stewart (1810-1887) of Banchory and Leggart and Mary Irvine (1811-1863).

He was educated at Dr. Tulloch’s Seminary, the Gymnasium, Chanonry, and King's College, Aberdeen, from where he graduated in Arts in 1855

He entered into business with his father who had founded the Aberdeen Combworks and after a year on the Grand Tour of Europe, worked there from 1857 to 1883.

He entered public life through the Aberdeen Chamber of Commerce, serving as President from 1883 to 1884. In 1885 he became Dean of Guild in which role he served for four years. In 1889 he was elected for Ferryhill Ward where he became Provost of Aberdeen and undertook four main schemes, the construction of a new street from Castle Street to Commerce Street, the extension of the city by incorporating Old Aberdeen, Woodside and Torry, the opening up of Marischal College to Broad Street, and the acquisition of land between old Aberdeen and the Inverurie turnpike for the erection of workmen’s houses. The latter scheme for housing was the only one which did not succeed.

He served on the Aberdeen Harbour Board and during his tenure, the facilities of the port were extended.

In the General Election in 1895 he contested South Aberdeen against James Bryce, 1st Viscount Bryce for the Liberal Unionist Party but was unsuccessful.

On 6 June 1896 he was knighted by Queen Victoria at Balmoral. His portrait was painted by Sir William Quiller Orchardson R.A. and is currently in the collection of the Aberdeen Art Gallery.

He was a director of the Northern Assurance Company and also held the offices of Justice of the Peace and Deputy Lieutenant of Aberdeenshire and Kincardineshire.

In 1904 he was appointed Chairman of the Great North of Scotland Railway, a position he held until his death in 1919.

== Family ==
He married (Dame) Margaret Dyce Brown (1836-1920), daughter of Revd David Brown (1803-1897), Moderator of the General Assembly, and Catherine Dyce (1805-1879) and they had the following children:

- John Irvine Stewart (1861-1869)
- (Colonel) David Brown Douglas Stewart (1862-1935)
- (Dame) Alexandra Catharine Dyce Stewart (1863-1928)
- William Dyce Stewart (1864-1920)
- Mary Stewart (1865-1954)
- Lucy Margaret Stewart (1865-1954)
- Julia Charlotte Stewart (1868-1935)
- Margaret Isabel Steward (1871-1943)
- George Irvine Thompson Stewart (1872-1923)
- Jessie Josephine Stewart (1873-1920)
- Charles Stewart (1876-1892)

Civic offices
Preceded by William Henderson	Lord Provost of Aberdeen; 1889–1895	Succeeded by John Fleming
