= List of listed buildings in Fraserburgh, Aberdeenshire =

This is a list of listed buildings in the parish of Fraserburgh in Aberdeenshire, Scotland.

== List ==
Name	Location	Date listed	Grid ref. (Note: Sometimes known as OSGB36, the grid reference (where provided) is based on the British national grid reference system used by the Ordnance Survey. • "Guide to National Grid". Ordnance Survey. • "Get-a-map". Ordnance Survey.)	Geo-coordinates	Notes	LB number (Note: Historic Environment Scotland assign a unique alphanumeric identifier to each designated site in Scotland, for listed buildings this always begins with "LB", for example "LB12345".)	Image
40 Main Street				57°41′48″N 2°00′54″W	Category C(S)	31944	Upload Photo
42 Main Street				57°41′48″N 2°00′55″W	Category C(S)	31945	Upload Photo
60 Main Street				57°41′48″N 2°00′56″W	Category C(S)	31951	Upload Photo
2 Gaw Street				57°41′47″N 2°00′57″W	Category C(S)	31960	Upload Photo
7-37 George Street				57°41′41″N 2°00′53″W	Category C(S)	31962	Upload Photo
6-46 George Street				57°41′43″N 2°00′52″W	Category C(S)	31965	Upload Photo
2-28 Noble Street				57°41′41″N 2°00′48″W	Category C(S)	31968	Upload Photo
Town House And Police Office 3 Saltoun Square And 1-5 Kirk Brae				57°41′38″N 2°00′17″W	Category B	31868	Upload another image
Coastguard Station Houses, 60-70 Saltoun Place				57°41′16″N 2°00′21″W	Category B	31901	Upload Photo
Windmill Tower Within Gray's Timber Yard Albert Street, Mid Street And Charlotte Street				57°41′30″N 2°00′43″W	Category B	31908	Upload another image
19 Main Street				57°41′43″N 2°00′51″W	Category C(S)	31913	Upload Photo
45 Main Street				57°41′48″N 2°00′57″W	Category C(S)	31924	Upload Photo
8, 10 Main Street				57°41′42″N 2°00′48″W	Category C(S)	31930	Upload Photo
Former Church Hall, Main Street				57°41′43″N 2°00′49″W	Category C(S)	31931	Upload Photo
22 Main Street				57°41′44″N 2°00′51″W	Category C(S)	31935	Upload Photo
Bridge Of Philorth Over Water Of Philorth				57°40′10″N 1°58′13″W	Category B	9589	Upload Photo
Philorth Dovecot On Kinbog Farm				57°39′17″N 2°00′01″W	Category B	9591	Upload Photo
30 Main Street				57°41′46″N 2°00′53″W	Category C(S)	31939	Upload Photo
34 Main Street				57°41′46″N 2°00′54″W	Category C(S)	31941	Upload Photo
4, 4-1/2 George Street And 30 Noble Street				57°41′41″N 2°00′50″W	Category C(S)	31964	Upload Photo
Old Parish Church Saltoun Square				57°41′37″N 2°00′16″W	Category B	31865	Upload Photo
Registrar's Office, 14, 16 Saltoun Square				57°41′39″N 2°00′19″W	Category B	31869	Upload another image
Dalyrmple Hall And Cafe Dalrymple Street				57°41′27″N 2°00′14″W	Category C(S)	31881	Upload another image
3 Duke Lane				57°41′43″N 2°00′15″W	Category C(S)	31882	Upload another image
24-32 Saltoun Place				57°41′26″N 2°00′23″W	Category B	31896	Upload Photo
113 Charlotte Street				57°41′27″N 2°00′40″W	Category C(S)	31907	Upload another image
2-16 College Bounds				57°41′40″N 2°00′44″W	Category B	31909	Upload Photo
13 Main Street				57°41′42″N 2°00′50″W	Category C(S)	31910	Upload Photo
20 Main Street				57°41′44″N 2°00′51″W	Category C(S)	31934	Upload Photo
28 Main Street				57°41′45″N 2°00′53″W	Category C(S)	31938	Upload Photo
44 Main Street				57°41′48″N 2°00′56″W	Category C(S)	31946	Upload Photo
46 Main Street				57°41′48″N 2°00′55″W	Category C(S)	31947	Upload Photo
69 Main Street				57°41′50″N 2°00′56″W	Category C(S)	31953	Upload Photo
3, 5 George Street				57°41′41″N 2°00′52″W	Category C(S)	31961	Upload Photo
3 Noble Street				57°41′41″N 2°00′47″W	Category C(S)	31966	Upload Photo
Saltoun Mausoleum E. Of Old Parish Church				57°41′36″N 2°00′16″W	Category B	31866	Upload another image
Brittanic Assurance Company Building, Broad Street And Commerce Street				57°41′29″N 2°00′16″W	Category B	31874	Upload Photo
64, 68 Frithside Street. (Salvation Army)				57°41′30″N 2°00′28″W	Category B	31891	Upload Photo
1, 3 Lodge Walk				57°41′29″N 2°00′31″W	Category C(S)	31894	Upload Photo
21, 23 Saltoun Place				57°41′26″N 2°00′25″W	Category C(S)	31897	Upload Photo
33 Main Street				57°41′45″N 2°00′54″W	Category C(S)	31919	Upload Photo
43 Main Street				57°41′47″N 2°00′56″W	Category C(S)	31923	Upload Photo
14 Main Street				57°41′43″N 2°00′50″W	Category C(S)	31932	Upload Photo
16 Main Street				57°41′43″N 2°00′50″W	Category C(S)	31933	Upload Photo
South Middleburgh Tollhouse				57°40′46″N 2°01′09″W	Category B	9593	Upload Photo
54 Main Street				57°41′50″N 2°00′54″W	Category C(S)	31949	Upload Photo
82 Main Street				57°41′51″N 2°01′01″W	Category C(S)	31958	Upload Photo
7, 9 Commerce Street				57°41′29″N 2°00′16″W	Category B	31875	Upload Photo
The World's End 11 Dalrymple Street				57°41′27″N 2°00′15″W	Category B	31880	Upload another image
62 Frithside Street				57°41′30″N 2°00′27″W	Category C(S)	31892	Upload Photo
27, 29 Saltoun Place				57°41′25″N 2°00′24″W	Category C(S)	31899	Upload Photo
31, 33, 35 Saltoun Place				57°41′24″N 2°00′24″W	Category C(S)	31900	Upload Photo
War Memorial Saltoun Place And St. Modan's Gate				57°41′13″N 2°00′22″W	Category B	31902	Upload Photo
25 Main Street				57°41′44″N 2°00′52″W	Category C(S)	31915	Upload Photo
51 Main Street				57°41′49″N 2°00′58″W	Category C(S)	31927	Upload Photo
North School Croft Bridge Over Water Of Philorth				57°39′06″N 1°59′51″W	Category C(S)	9590	Upload Photo
32 Main Street				57°41′46″N 2°00′54″W	Category C(S)	31940	Upload Photo
39 George Street				57°41′45″N 2°00′57″W	Category C(S)	31963	Upload Photo
5 Noble Street				57°41′42″N 2°00′47″W	Category C(S)	31967	Upload Photo
Saltoun Place, Fountain				57°41′19″N 2°00′22″W	Category B	31970	Upload Photo
Market Cross Saltoun Square				57°41′37″N 2°00′19″W	Category A	31867	Upload another image See more images
Clydesdale Bank Broad Street And 1 Mid Street				57°41′34″N 2°00′19″W	Category B	31871	Upload another image
5 Commerce Street				57°41′29″N 2°00′15″W	Category B	31876	Upload Photo
25 Saltoun Place				57°41′25″N 2°00′24″W	Category C(S)	31898	Upload Photo
St. Peter's Rectory, Victoria Street				57°41′24″N 2°00′35″W	Category B	31904	Upload another image
27 Main Street				57°41′44″N 2°00′53″W	Category C(S)	31916	Upload Photo
Kinglasser Old Farmhouse (Now Store)				57°39′41″N 2°00′29″W	Category C(S)	9592	Upload Photo
Shalom, 72 Main Street				57°41′50″N 2°00′58″W	Category C(S)	31954	Upload Photo
73 Main Street				57°41′50″N 2°00′58″W	Category C(S)	31955	Upload Photo
3, 5 Broadsea Road				57°41′41″N 2°00′45″W	Category C(S)	31969	Upload Photo
3 And A Half Duke Lane				57°41′43″N 2°00′15″W	Category C(S)	31883	Upload another image
5 Duke Lane				57°41′42″N 2°00′16″W	Category C(S)	31884	Upload another image
Wine Tower				57°41′51″N 2°00′10″W	Category A	31889	Upload another image
41 Commerce Street And 66, 68 Cross Street				57°41′29″N 2°00′24″W	Category C(S)	31893	Upload Photo
Craigielea (Old Manse) 7 Saltoun Place				57°41′27″N 2°00′27″W	Category C(S)	31895	Upload Photo
St. Peter's School, Victoria Street				57°41′25″N 2°00′31″W	Category B	31903	Upload Photo
17 Main Street				57°41′43″N 2°00′51″W	Category C(S)	31912	Upload Photo
23 Main Street				57°41′44″N 2°00′52″W	Category C(S)	31914	Upload Photo
29 Main Street				57°41′45″N 2°00′53″W	Category C(S)	31917	Upload Photo
35 Main Street				57°41′46″N 2°00′55″W	Category C(S)	31920	Upload Photo
47 Main Street				57°41′48″N 2°00′57″W	Category C(S)	31925	Upload Photo
52 Main Street				57°41′49″N 2°00′54″W	Category C(S)	31948	Upload Photo
64 Main Street				57°41′49″N 2°00′55″W	Category C(S)	31952	Upload Photo
78 Main Street				57°41′50″N 2°00′59″W	Category C(S)	31956	Upload Photo
80 Main Street				57°41′51″N 2°01′00″W	Category C(S)	31957	Upload Photo
50-54 Broad Street				57°41′32″N 2°00′19″W	Category B	31872	Upload another image
Custom House, (Formerly Occupied By Bank Of Scotland) Broad Street And Frithside Street				57°41′32″N 2°00′19″W	Category A	31873	Upload another image See more images
10 Commerce Street				57°41′28″N 2°00′16″W	Category B	31877	Upload Photo
Harbour Works Office At Middle Jetty				57°41′33″N 2°00′14″W	Category C(S)	31879	Upload another image
9 Duke Lane				57°41′43″N 2°00′15″W	Category C(S)	31886	Upload another image
Kinnaird's Head Castle Lighthouse				57°41′51″N 2°00′14″W	Category A	31888	Upload another image See more images
St. Peter's Episcopal Church, Charlotte Street				57°41′25″N 2°00′35″W	Category B	31905	Upload another image
Central School Charlotte Street				57°41′28″N 2°00′42″W	Category B	31906	Upload another image
15 Main Street				57°41′42″N 2°00′50″W	Category C(S)	31911	Upload Photo
41 Main Street				57°41′47″N 2°00′56″W	Category C(S)	31922	Upload Photo
24 Main Street				57°41′45″N 2°00′52″W	Category C(S)	31936	Upload Photo
Philorth Churchyard Within Fraserburgh Cemetery				57°40′45″N 2°00′03″W	Category B	9588	Upload Photo
36 Main Street				57°41′47″N 2°00′54″W	Category C(S)	31942	Upload Photo
38 Main Street				57°41′47″N 2°00′55″W	Category C(S)	31943	Upload Photo
56 Main Street				57°41′49″N 2°00′55″W	Category B	31950	Upload Photo
84 Main Street				57°41′51″N 2°01′02″W	Category C(S)	31959	Upload Photo
Saltoun Arms, Saltoun Square				57°41′38″N 2°00′20″W	Category B	31870	Upload another image See more images
Fraserburgh South Church Of Scotland				57°41′24″N 2°00′15″W	Category B	31878	Upload another image
7 Duke Lane				57°41′43″N 2°00′15″W	Category C(S)	31885	Upload another image
2 Duke Lane				57°41′42″N 2°00′14″W	Category C(S)	31887	Upload another image
1, 3 Caroline Place And 89 High Street				57°41′39″N 2°00′35″W	Category C(S)	31890	Upload Photo
31 Main Street				57°41′45″N 2°00′54″W	Category C(S)	31918	Upload Photo
39 Main Street				57°41′47″N 2°00′56″W	Category C(S)	31921	Upload Photo
49 Main Street				57°41′48″N 2°00′58″W	Category C(S)	31926	Upload Photo
53 Main Street				57°41′49″N 2°00′59″W	Category C(S)	31928	Upload Photo
6 Main Street				57°41′42″N 2°00′47″W	Category C(S)	31929	Upload Photo
26 Main Street				57°41′45″N 2°00′52″W	Category C(S)	31937	Upload Photo

== Key ==
The scheme for classifying buildings in Scotland is:

- Category A: "buildings of national or international importance, either architectural or historic; or fine, little-altered examples of some particular period, style or building type."
- Category B: "buildings of regional or more than local importance; or major examples of some particular period, style or building type, which may have been altered."
- Category C: "buildings of local importance; lesser examples of any period, style, or building type, as originally constructed or moderately altered; and simple traditional buildings which group well with other listed buildings."

In March 2016 there were 47,288 listed buildings in Scotland. Of these, 8% were Category A, and 50% were Category B, with the remaining 42% being Category C.

== See also ==
- List of listed buildings in Aberdeenshire
