= Inglismaldie Castle =

Coordinates: 56.7922°N 2.5849°W

- Marykirk
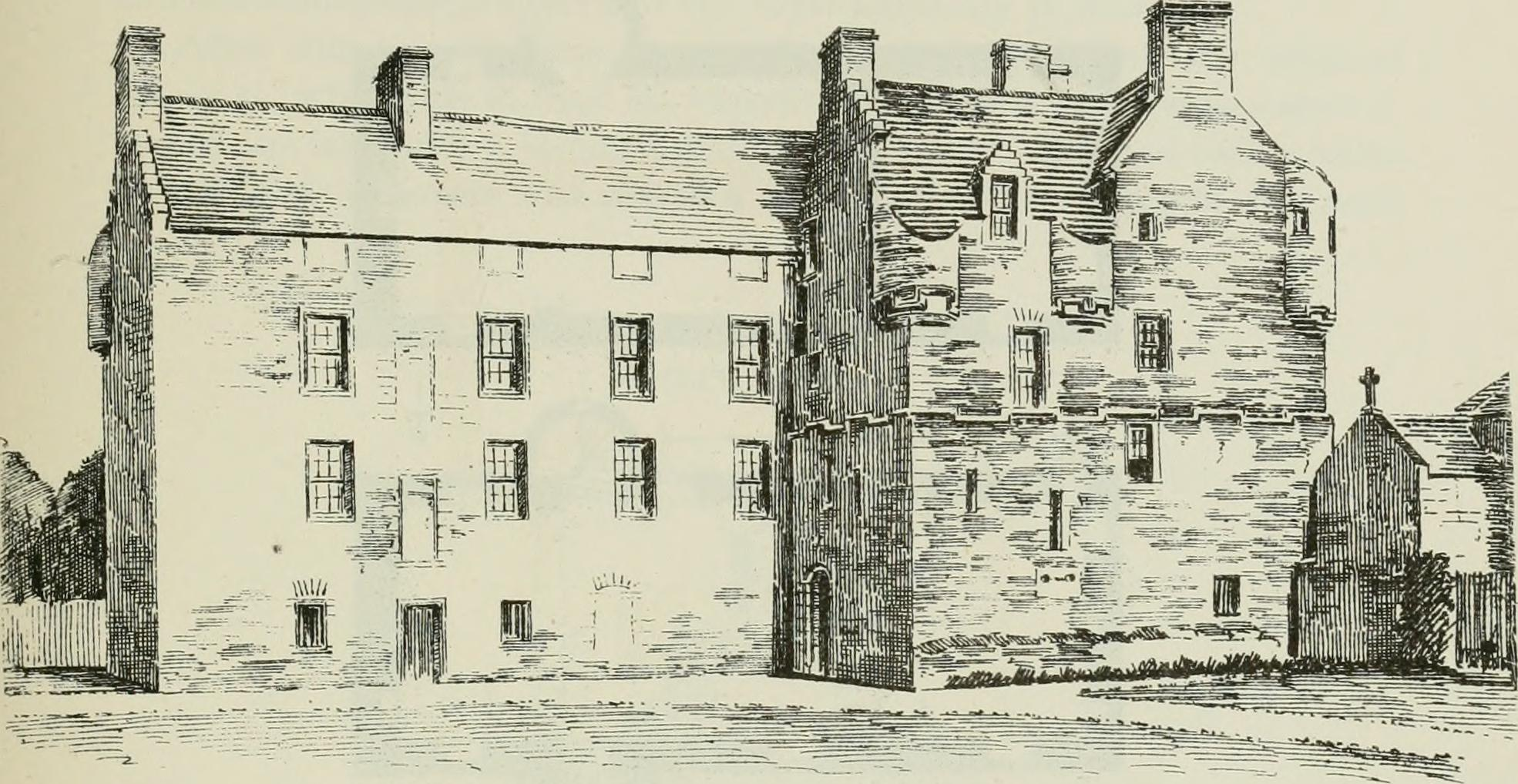
- Drawing of Inglismaldie Castle

Inglismaldie Castle is a castle in the parish of Marykirk and the county of Kincardineshire, Scotland.

== History ==
The Tower House was built in 1636. It was revised in 1882 by the Aberdeen-based architect James Matthews. At that time, Inglismaldie was one of the properties of the Earl of Kintore.

In 2007, the pigeon house was added to the register of endangered listed buildings in Scotland. Seven years later, its condition was classified as very poor with moderate risk.
