= Portree Sheriff Court =

Judicial building in Portree, Scotland

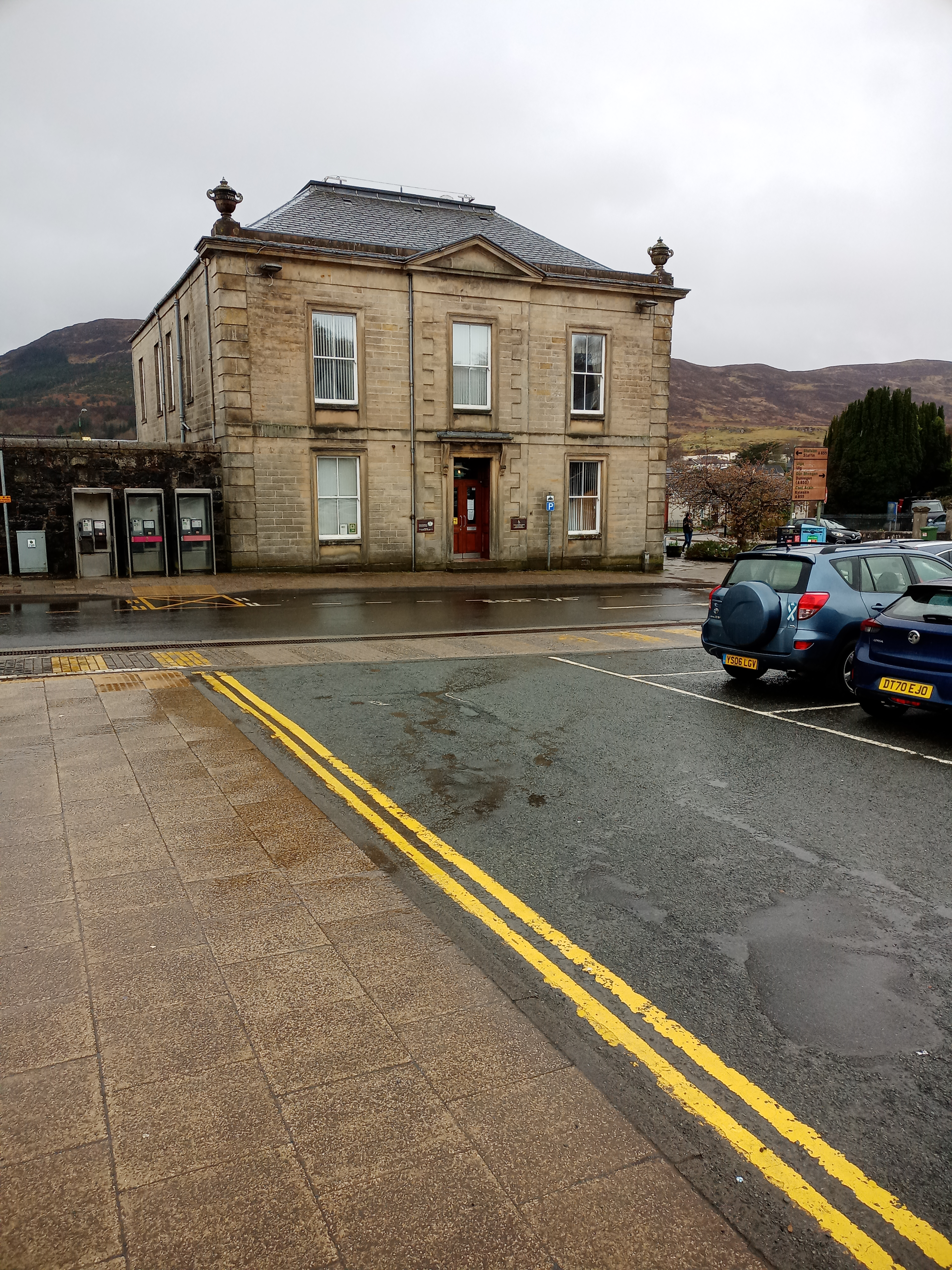
- The building in 2022

- Shown within the Isle of Skye
- 57.4128°N 6.1949°W
- Location: Somerled Square, Portree

History
- Built: 1877

Site notes
- Architect(s): James Matthews and William Lawrie
- Architectural style: Neoclassical style

Listed Building – Category C(S)
- Official name: Portree Sheriff Court, Somerled Square, Portree
- Designated: 5 October 1971
- Reference no.: LB13923

Portree Sheriff Court is a judicial building in Somerled Square in Portree on the Isle of Skye in Scotland. The building, which continues to be used as a courthouse, is a Category C listed building.

== History ==
The post of Sheriff of Skye dates back at least to 1223, when Paul Balkason was serving in that role under King Haakon IV of Norway. By the late 17th century, records show that the local laird, Sir Donald Macdonald, 3rd Baronet maintained a sheriff court, to keep his subjects in order. In the mid-19th century, court officials decided to commission a dedicated courthouse for the town. The site they selected was on the southwest side of Somerled Square.

The new building was designed by James Matthews and William Lawrie in the neoclassical style, built in ashlar stone and was completed in 1877. The design involved a symmetrical main frontage of three bays facing onto Somerled Square. The central bay, which was slightly projected forward, featured a square-headed doorway with a rectangular fanlight flanked by brackets supporting a cornice. The other bays on the ground floor and all the bays on the first floor were fenestrated by sash windows with moulded architraves. There were quoins at the edges of the central bay and at the corners of the building and, at roof level, there was an entablature, a pediment over the central bay, and urns at the corners. Internally, the principal room was the courtroom on the first floor, which featured a simple moulded cornice, and three police cells.

In May 1885, the building was the venue for the trial of a group of crofters from Glendale, who had demanded the return of the common grazing land that had been taken from them during the Highland Clearances. They were accused of rioting, assault on a sheriff officer and breach of the peace. Two of them were found guilty and sentenced to three weeks in prison, a remarkably lenient sentence by the standards of the time.

The building continues to serve as the venue for sheriff court hearings in the area, although, due to staffing issues with the escort services, hearings involving juries were moved to the mainland in July 2023.

== See also ==
- List of listed buildings in Portree, Highland
