= Stonehaven Town House =

Municipal building in Stonehaven, Scotland

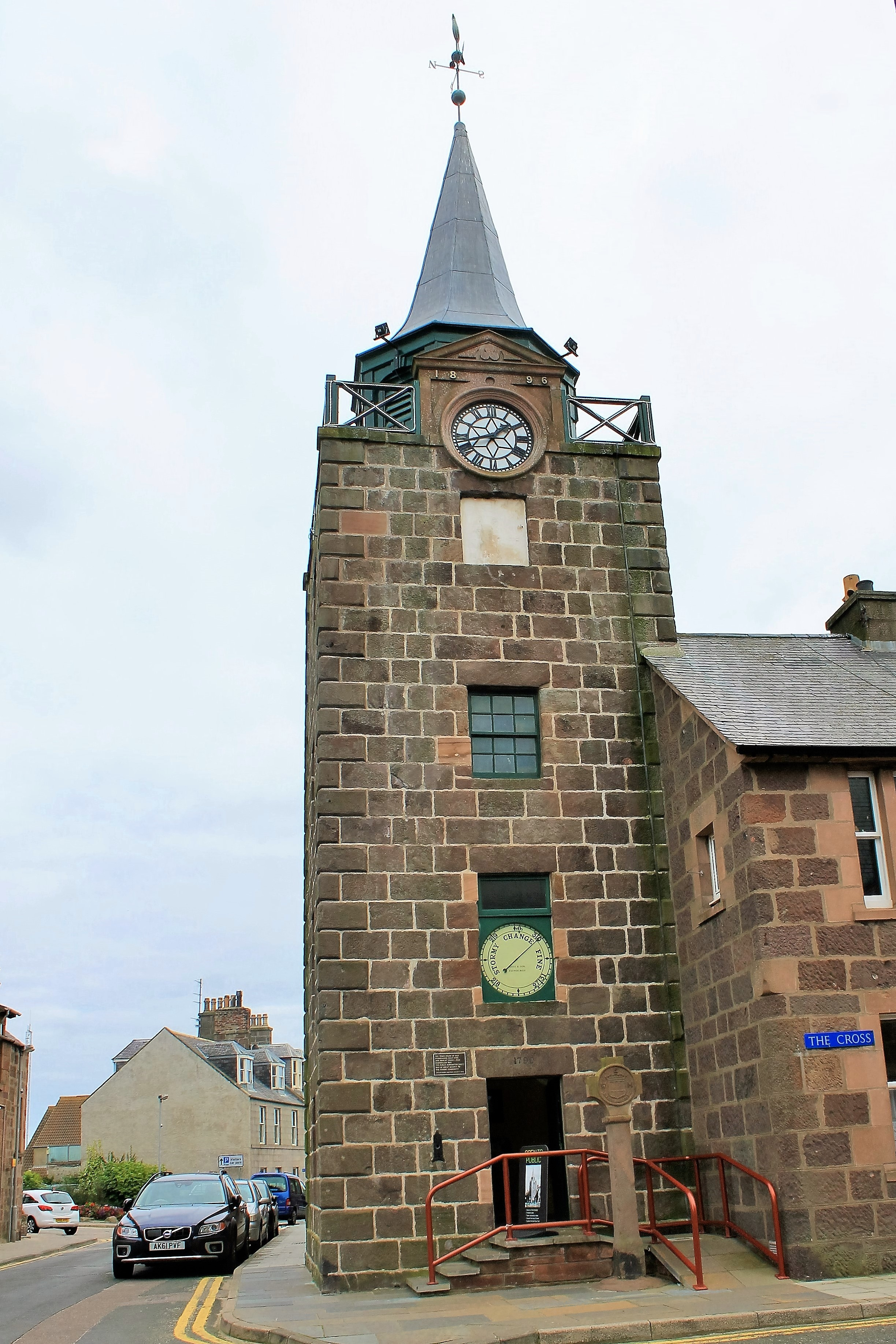
- The building in 2015

- Shown in Aberdeenshire
- 56.9608°N 2.2043°W
- Location: High Street, Stonehaven

History
- Built: 1790

Site notes
- Architect: James Rhind
- Architectural style: Scottish medieval style

Listed Building – Category B
- Official name: High Street, The Cross, The Town House
- Designated: 18 August 1972
- Reference no.: LB41615

Stonehaven Town House, also known as the Clock Tower and the Old Town Steeple, is a former municipal building on the High Street in Stonehaven in Aberdeenshire in Scotland. The building, which was previously the meeting place of the burgh council, is a Category B listed building.

== History ==
The first municipal building in Stonehaven was the Stonehaven Tolbooth which was erected on the old pier in the late 16th century. It was used as a county courthouse for the county of Kincardineshire but, after a new county courthouse was established in Dunnottar Avenue in 1767, it became a storehouse.

The steeple was erected by public subscription in the High Street, a short distance to the west of the tolbooth. It was designed by James Rhind in the Scottish medieval style, built in rubble masonry and was completed in 1790. The design involved a four-stage tower with a doorway in the first stage, sash windows in the second and third stages and clock faces on the fourth stage, all surmounted by a hexagonal belfry with louvres, a spire and a weather vane. The original clock was designed and manufactured by James Duncan of Oldmeldrum.

The building, which was augmented by new blocks to the east and south and became known as the "Town House", served as a meeting place for the burgh council. A barometer was installed in the second stage in 1852 and the mercat cross was moved to its present location, in front of the door to the steeple in 1864. However, the town house was in the "Auld Toon" part of Stonehaven and, in the 19th century the focus of development moved north of the Carron Water to what became known as the "New Town": the market buildings were built on the west side of Allardice Street and completed in 1827. The burgh council relocated to a new town hall in Allardice Street in the "New Town" in 1878.

Meanwhile, at the Town House, the cross on the top of the shaft of the mercat cross was replaced with a new cross bearing the arms of William Keith, 7th Earl Marischal in 1887, a new bell was installed in the belfry also in 1887, and the clock faces on the steeple were elevated to the top of the fourth stage and given carved pediments in 1894.

During much of the 20th century and the early 21st century, the main role of the building was to provide the bell chimes for the Stonehaven Fireballs Festival at Hogmanay each year. The building was otherwise underused and the condition of the fabric was allowed to deteriorate. It was closed during the COVID-19 pandemic in 2020 and most of 2021, and then one of its windows was blown out during Storm Arwen in November 2021. An extensive programme of refurbishment works, involved the creation of an interpretive display area on the ground floor, the replacement the flooring on the upper floors, and the servicing of the clock by Smith of Derby, was carried out at a cost of £250,000. Following the completion of the works, the building was re-opened in July 2023.

== See also ==
- List of listed buildings in Stonehaven, Aberdeenshire
