= Fraserburgh Town House =

Municipal building in Fraserburgh, Scotland

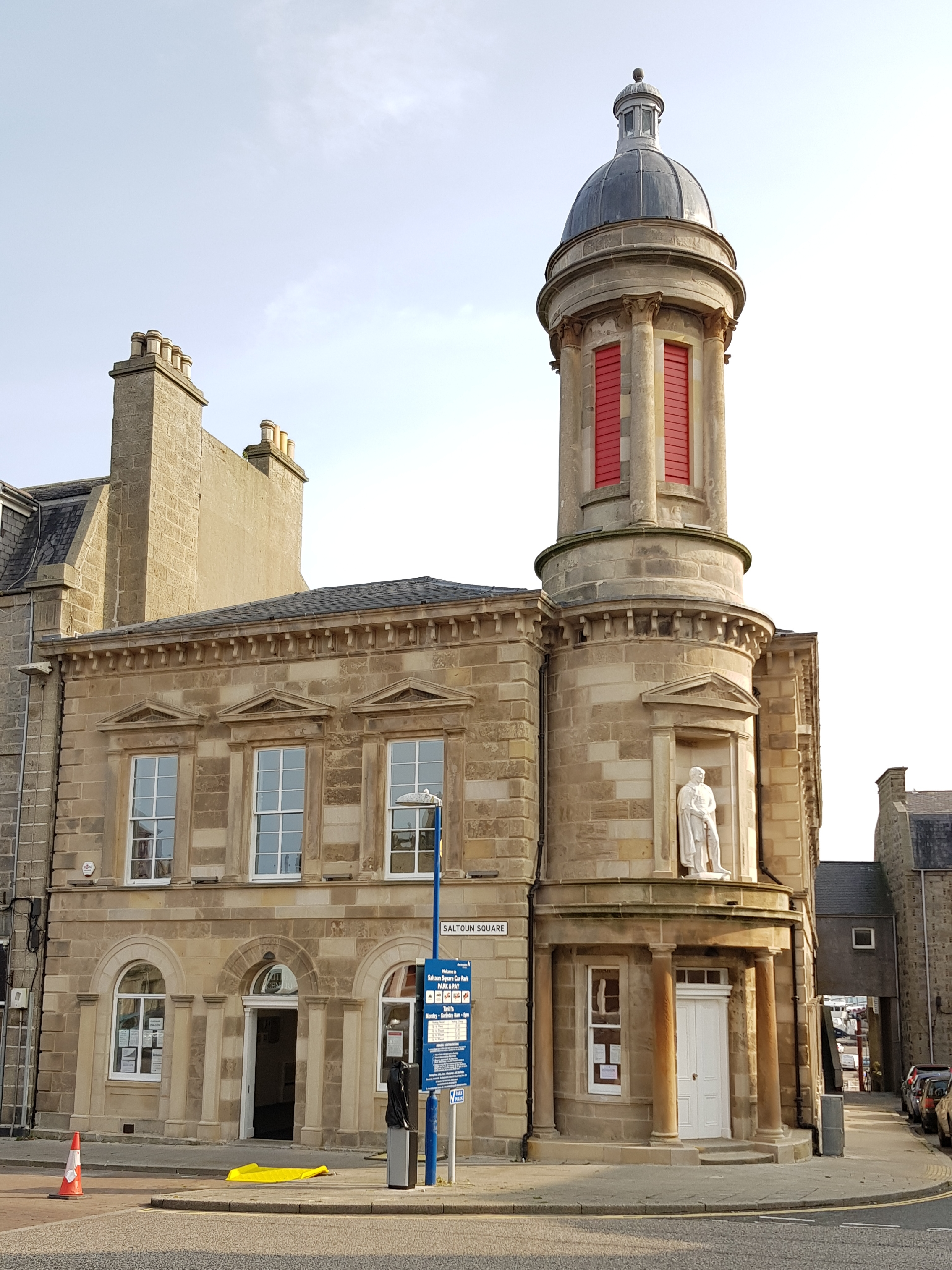
- Fraserburgh Town House

- Shown in Aberdeenshire
- 57.6938°N 2.0049°W
- Location: Saltoun Square, Fraserburgh

History
- Built: 1855

Site notes
- Architect: Matthews and MacKenzie
- Architectural style: Renaissance style

Listed Building – Category B
- Official name: Town Hall and Police Office, 3 Saltoun Square and 1-5 Kirk Brae
- Designated: 16 April 1971
- Reference no.: LB31868

Fraserburgh Town House is a municipal building in Saltoun Square, Fraserburgh, Scotland. The building, which was the headquarters of Fraserburgh Burgh Council, is a Category B listed building.

== History ==
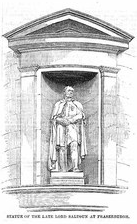
Drawing of the statue by Edward Bowring Stephens of Lieutenant-General Alexander Fraser, 17th Lord Saltoun, at Fraserburgh Town House

The first municipal building in the town was an early-17th century tolbooth commissioned by the local laird, Sir Alexander Fraser. It was primarily used as a prison and a local meeting place: latterly referred to as the town hall, it was a building with a gable and an external staircase facing Saltoun Square. Following significant population growth, largely associated with the status of the town as a seaport, the area became a police burgh in 1840. By the mid-19th century the old building was dilapidated and the new burgh commissioners decided to demolish it and to replace it with a more substantial structure.

The foundation stone for the new building was laid on 13 April 1853. It was designed by Thomas Mackenzie of Matthews and MacKenzie in the Renaissance style, built in ashlar stone and was completed in 1855. The design involved a symmetrical rounded frontage at the junction of Saltoun Square and Kirk Brae; it featured a doorway, with two sash windows on either side, which were flanked by Doric order columns supporting a rounded entablature. There was a rotunda with Corinthian order columns supporting a dome at roof level. The other bays were fenestrated by round headed sash windows on the ground floor and by pedimented sash windows on the first floor. Internally, the principal room was the council chamber.

An aedicula containing a statue, depicting Lieutenant-General Alexander Fraser, 17th Lord Saltoun, and sculpted by Edward Bowring Stephens, was installed on the corner of the building at first floor level in December 1859. The statue commemorated the life of the local laird who had seen action as a junior officer at the Battle of Waterloo and as a senior commander in the First Opium War and who had died just after construction work on the new town house had started.

The town house was the venue where, at a meeting in February 1875, local dignitaries agreed to raise the 24th Aberdeenshire Rifle Volunteers, which later became G Company, the 3rd (The Buchan) Volunteer Battalion, The Gordon Highlanders. Civic leaders hosted a banquet in the town house in August 1905 to recognise the achievements of the locally-born banker, Sir George Anderson, who served as treasurer of the Bank of Scotland. The building, which had originally involved a frontage of five bays on the Kirk Brae elevation, was extended by extra four bays to create a police station to a design by Reid and McRobbie in 1906.

The building continued to serve as the headquarters of Fraserburgh Burgh Council for much of the 20th century but ceased to be the local seat of government after the enlarged Banff and Buchan District Council was formed at Banff in 1975. The police service moved to new premises in Finlayson Street in the late 1990s leaving the Kirk Brae police station vacant and deteriorating. An extensive programme of restoration works, which included the construction of a modern steel-clad extension behind the town house to a design by Moxon Architects, was completed in May 2018. The works also involved the creation of a modern registrar's office on the ground floor, the establishment of an enterprise hub on the first floor and the adaption of the council chamber for use as a venue for weddings and civil partnership ceremonies.

Works of art in the town house include portraits by of John Shirreffs of the former provost, John Park, and of the former baron bailee, Sir George Anderson.

== See also ==
- List of listed buildings in Fraserburgh, Aberdeenshire
