= Woodcot Hospital =

- NHS Grampian
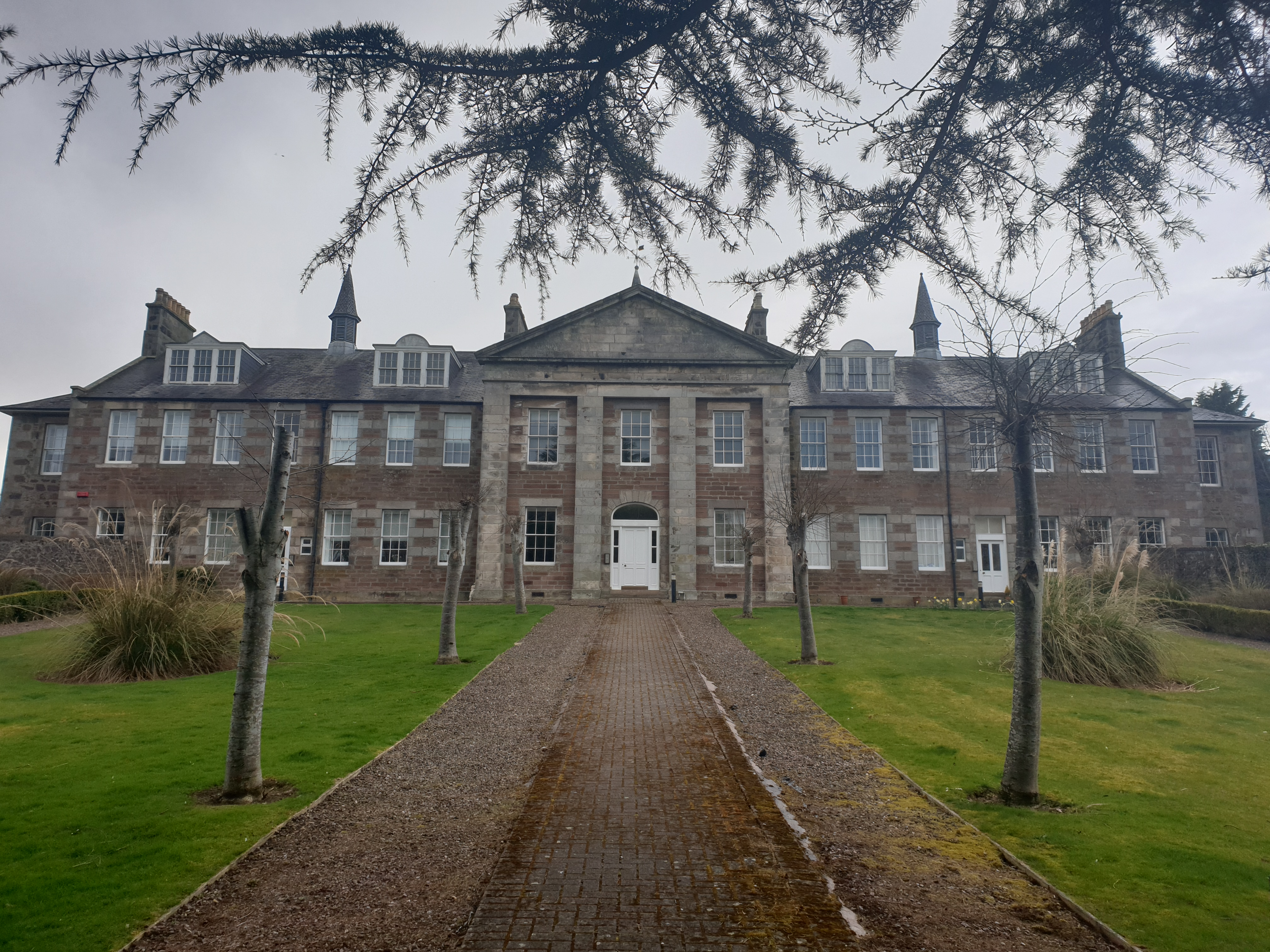
- Woodcot Hospital in 2021

- Shown in Aberdeenshire

Geography
- Location: Woodcot Brae, Stonehaven, Aberdeenshire, Scotland, United Kingdom
- Coordinates: 56.9615°N 2.2218°W

Organisation
- Care system: NHS Scotland
- Type: General

History
- Founded: 1948
- Closed: 1998

Links
- Lists: Hospitals in Scotland

Woodcot Hospital was a health facility in Woodcot Brae, Stonehaven, Scotland. It is a Category B listed building.

== History ==
The hospital had its origins in the Kincardineshire Combination Poorhouse which was design by William Henderson and completed in August 1867. It was converted for clinical use and joined the National Health Service as Woodcot Hospital in 1948. It closed in 1998 and the main building was converted into a luxury apartment complex known as Woodcot Court in 2000.
