= List of listed buildings in Fort William, Highland =

This is a list of listed buildings in the burgh of Fort William in Highland, Scotland.

== List ==
Name	Location	Date listed	Grid ref. (Note: Sometimes known as OSGB36, the grid reference (where provided) is based on the British national grid reference system used by the Ordnance Survey. • "Guide to National Grid". Ordnance Survey. • "Get-a-map". Ordnance Survey.)	Geo-coordinates	Notes	LB number (Note: Historic Environment Scotland assign a unique alphanumeric identifier to each designated site in Scotland, for listed buildings this always begins with "LB", for example "LB12345".)	Image
4, 6, 8 High Street, Royal Bank Of Scotland, Retaining Wall And Gate Piers				56°49′07″N 5°06′35″W	Category C(S)	31786	Upload another image
High Street, St Andrew's Episcopal Church, Burial Ground, Lych Gate (To High Street) And Entrance To Bank Street				56°49′08″N 5°06′32″W	Category A	31788	Upload another image See more images
Donald Cameron Of Lochiel Statue, The Parade				56°49′10″N 5°06′28″W	Category C(S)	31794	Upload another image See more images
1-12 Inclusive Nos Seaview Terrace And Laundry Building				56°48′53″N 5°06′54″W	Category C(S)	31795	Upload another image
West Highland Museum, 4, 6, 8 Cameron Square				56°49′04″N 5°06′40″W	Category B	31781	Upload another image See more images
Fassifern Road, Cameron Obelisk				56°49′04″N 5°06′33″W	Category B	31785	Upload another image
Nevis Bridge (New) Over River Nevis				56°49′18″N 5°05′38″W	Category B	31790	Upload Photo
Duncansburgh Parish Church Of Scotland, The Parade				56°49′09″N 5°06′25″W	Category B	31792	Upload another image See more images
Fassifern Road, St Andrew's East And West (Former Episcopal Rectory And School), Garden Walls And Gate Piers				56°49′05″N 5°06′25″W	Category B	31783	Upload Photo
Fort William Primary School, Achintore Road				56°48′51″N 5°07′01″W	Category B	43374	Upload another image See more images
Nevis Bridge (Old) Over River Nevis				56°49′18″N 5°05′31″W	Category B	31791	Upload Photo
The Highland Hotel, Union Road				56°48′56″N 5°06′44″W	Category B	31796	Upload another image See more images
Achintore Road, Glentower, (Former Ben Nevis Low Level Observatory)				56°48′48″N 5°07′06″W	Category B	31779	Upload another image
38 High Street				56°49′05″N 5°06′39″W	Category B	31787	Upload another image
Roman Catholic Church Of St Mary And The Immaculate Conception And Enclosing Walls With Gate Piers, Belford Road				56°49′11″N 5°06′13″W	Category A	31780	Upload another image See more images
The Parade The Governor's House				56°49′08″N 5°06′28″W	Category B	31793	Upload Photo
The Craigs Burial Ground, Ewen Maclachlan Obelisk And Gateway				56°49′16″N 5°06′05″W	Category B	31782	Upload Photo
Former Macintosh Memorial Church Of Scotland (former Free Church Of Scotland), Fassifern Road				56°49′01″N 5°06′40″W	Category C(S)	31784	Upload another image See more images
High Street, Free Church Of Scotland And Former School				56°48′59″N 5°06′52″W	Category B	31789	Upload another image

== Key ==
The scheme for classifying buildings in Scotland is:

- Category A: "buildings of national or international importance, either architectural or historic; or fine, little-altered examples of some particular period, style or building type."
- Category B: "buildings of regional or more than local importance; or major examples of some particular period, style or building type, which may have been altered."
- Category C: "buildings of local importance; lesser examples of any period, style, or building type, as originally constructed or moderately altered; and simple traditional buildings which group well with other listed buildings."

In March 2016 there were 47,288 listed buildings in Scotland. Of these, 8% were Category A, and 50% were Category B, with the remaining 42% being Category C.

== See also ==
- List of listed buildings in Highland
