= Knaven =

Knaven is a surname of Dutch origin. Notable people with that name include:

- Mirre Knaven (born/ 2004), Dutch cyclist
- Servais Knaven (born 1971), Dutch cyclist
- Tessa Knaven (born 1971), Dutch rower
