= List of shipwrecks in December 1870 =

The list of shipwrecks in December 1870 includes ships sunk, foundered, grounded, or otherwise lost during December 1870.

== 1 December ==
List of shipwrecks: 1 December 1870
Ship	State	Description
Arche d'Alliance	France	The ship was driven ashore and wrecked at Faro, Portugal. She was on a voyage from Huelva, Spain to Liverpool Lancashire, United Kingdom.
Bekara	United Kingdom	The schooner was run into by the steamship Osprey (United Kingdom) and sank in the River Thames at Belvedere, Kent.
Cardiff Packet	United Kingdom	The schooner collided with the schooner Azores Packet (United Kingdom) and sank off Mullion Island, in Mounts Bay, Cornwall. Her crew were rescued. Cardiff Packet was on a voyage from Cardiff, Glamorgan to St Germans, Cornwall.
Elver	United Kingdom	The fishing smack collided with the steamship Cromwell (United Kingdom) and sank. Her crew were rescued.
Lagos	United Kingdom	The schooner was abandoned 75 nautical miles (139 km) west of "Shebar". She was on a voyage from Liverpool to Lagos, Africa.
Penguin	United Kingdom	The steamship ran aground in the Clyde at Dumbarton. She was on a voyage from the Clyde to Liverpool, Lancashire. She was refloated the next day and resumed her voyage.
Union des Chargeurs	France	The ship struck the quayside at Havre de Grâce, Seine-Inférieure and was damaged. She put back to Havre de Grâce for repairs.

== 2 December ==
List of shipwrecks: 2 December 1870
Ship	State	Description
Alina	(Russian Empire) Grand Duchy of Finland	The barque was driven ashore on Saltholm, Denmark. She was on a voyage from Gävle, Sweden to Hull, Yorkshire.
Alma	Sweden	The ship was driven ashore on Saltholm, Denmark. She was on a voyage from Gävle to Hull, Yorkshire, United Kingdom.
Beta	Portugal	The steamship ran aground in the Douro.
Gretine	Prussia	The galiot was driven ashore on Inchgarvie in the Firth of Forth. She was on a voyage from Charlestown, Ross-shire to Emden. She was refloated. She was refloated.
Leah	Lübeck	The ship was driven ashore and wrecked at Kappelshamn, Sweden.
Marie Celine	United Kingdom	The ship was wrecked on Penfret, Glénan Islands, Finistère. She was on a voyage from Bilbao, Spain to Swansea, Glamorgan, United Kingdom.
Resolution	United Kingdom	The brig was abandoned in the Atlantic Ocean off the coast of Brazil with the loss of all but three of her crew. She foundered the next day. She was on a voyage from Bahia, Brazil to London.
Tom	United Kingdom	The ship was driven ashore in the Dardanelles. She was on a voyage from Berdyanski, Russia to Malta.

== 3 December ==
List of shipwrecks: 3 December 1870
Ship	State	Description
Alpha	Hamburg	The brig was destroyed by fire at Hebburn, Northumberland, United Kingdom.
Garibaldi	United Kingdom	The schooner collided with Seagull (United Kingdom) and foundered in The Downs. Her crew survived.
Jane Corey	United Kingdom	The steamship ran aground on the Vogelsand, in the North Sea. She was refloated and resumed her voyage.
Maria	Prussia	The schooner was abandoned in the North Sea 30 nautical miles (56 km) off Scarborough, Yorkshire, United Kingdom. Her crew were rescued. She was on a voyage from Dram, Norway to Papenburg.
Maria da Gloria	Brazil	The ship ran aground at Faial Island, Azores. She was consequently condemned.
Wickham	United Kingdom	The ship was driven ashore and wrecked at Blakeney, Norfolk. She was on a voyage from Sunderland, County Durham to Southampton, Hampshire.

== 4 December ==
List of shipwrecks: 4 December 1870
Ship	State	Description
Doune Castle	United Kingdom	The ship ran aground on the Haisborough Sands, in the North Sea off the coast of Norfolk. She was on a voyage from South Shields, County Durham to London. She was refloated with assistance from the Caister Lifeboat and taken in to Great Yarmouth, Norfolk.
Elva	United Kingdom	The fishing smack was run down and sunk by the steamship Cromwell (United Kingdom) 8 nautical miles (15 km) east north east of the North Foreland, Kent. Her crew were rescued by Cromwell.
Gladstone, and May Queen	United Kingdom	The steamship Gladstone collided with the steamship May Queen and was abandoned the North Sea off the Newarp Lightship ( Trinity House) by eight of the 26 people on board. They were rescued by the steamship Ransome (United Kingdom). May Queen was on a voyage from Middlesbrough, Yorkshire to London. She was subsequently taken in to Lowestoft, Suffolk. May Queen was on a voyage from London to Dundee, Forfarshire. She put in to South Shields, County Durham sinking at the bows.
Jantje Wilkins	Netherlands	The ship departed from Helsingør, Denmark for Shoreham-by-Sea, Sussex, United Kingdom. No further trace, presumed foundered with the loss of all hands.
Nil Desperandum	United Kingdom	The brig was wrecked on the Longsand, in the North Sea off the coast of Essex with the loss of all hands. she was on a voyage from Sunderland, County Durham to Civita Vecchia, Italy.
Osiris	United Kingdom	The brigantine ran aground on the Spaniard Sand and sank. Her crew were rescued. She was on a voyage from South Shields to Faversham, Kent.
Rodego Donavero	Italy	The barque ran aground in the River Tees. She was refloated with assistance from the tug Victor (United Kingdom).
Sea Gull, and an Unnamed vessel	United Kingdom; Flag unknown	The unnamed schooner was run into by the schooner Sea Gull and sank in The Downs with the presumed loss of all hands. Sea Gull was severely damaged. She was on a voyage from Wilmington, Delaware, United States to London.
Thomas Hubbuck	United Kingdom	The brigantine was driven ashore and sank at Dungeness, Kent. Her crew were rescued. She was on a voyage from Caen, Calvados, France to London.

== 5 December ==
List of shipwrecks: 5 December 1870
Ship	State	Description
Joutsen	United Kingdom	The ship ran aground on the Hafre Riff, off Nidingen, Sweden. She was on a voyage from Skutskär, Sweden to Hartlepool, County Durham. She was refloated and resumed her voyage.
Nancy	United Kingdom	The ship collided with Nimrod ( Courland Governorate) and sank at Sandhammaren, Norway. Nancy was on a voyage from Leith, Lothian to Pillau, Prussia.
San Francisco	United Kingdom	The steamship ran aground and sank at Bermuda. She was on a voyage from New York to Bermuda. She was refloated on 17 December.
Thor	United Kingdom	The brigantine was driven ashore and wrecked 2 nautical miles (3.7 km) west of Dungeness, Kent.
Valdes	Spain	The steamship ran aground on the Long Bank, in the Irish Sea off the coast of County Wexford, United Kingdom. She was on a voyage from Liverpool, Lancashire, United Kingdom to Seville. She was refloated with the assistance of two tugs and towed in to Waterford, United Kingdom.

== 6 December ==
List of shipwrecks: 6 December 1870
Ship	State	Description
Alfred	(United Kingdom of Great Britain and Ireland) Guernsey	The ship was wrecked on São Miguel Island, Azores. Her crew were rescued.
Borneo	United Kingdom	The steamship was lost off Cape Santa Martha, Brazil with the loss of 37 lives. She was on a voyage from London to Buenos Aires, Argentina.
Eastern Belle	United Kingdom	The full-rigged ship was driven ashore on Scharhörn, Hamburg. She was refloated and towed in to Cuxhaven.
Freedom	(United Kingdom of Great Britain and Ireland) Jersey	The smack was driven ashore at Breaksea Point, Glamorgan. She was on a voyage from Poole, Dorset to Bristol, Gloucestershire.
Spindrift	United Kingdom	The ship was driven ashore on São Jorge Island, Azores with the loss of seven of her crew. She was on a voyage from Liverpool, Lancashire to a port in Tabasco, Mexico.
Supply	New Zealand	The cutter was wrecked close to Pencarrow Head in a northwesterly gale while en route from Havelock, New Zealand to Wellington.
No. 35	United Kingdom	The pilot boat was driven ashore at Cardiff.

== 7 December ==
List of shipwrecks: 7 December 1870
Ship	State	Description
Augusta	Sweden	The ship was driven ashore in Aalbek Bay. She was on a voyage from Dysart, Fife, United Kingdom to Helsingborg.
Clarendon	United Kingdom	The schooner was driven ashore at Wells-next-the-Sea, Norfolk. She was on a voyage from Harburg to Burnham Overy Staithe, Norfolk. She was refloated.
Colorado	Trieste	The brig was wrecked on the Tendra Spit, Russia. Her eleven crew were rescued. She was on a voyage from Constantinople, Ottoman Empire to Odesa, Russia.
Louisa	United Kingdom	The ship was wrecked at Rota, Spain. Her crew were rescued. She was on a voyage from Newcastle upon Tyne, Northumberland to Cádiz, Spain.
Moldavia	United Kingdom	The steamship ran aground on the Goodwin Sands, Kent. She was on a voyage from Liverpool, Lancashire to Rotterdam, South Holland, Netherlands. She was refloated with assistance and put in to Dover, Kent.

== 8 December ==
List of shipwrecks: 8 December 1870
Ship	State	Description
Ansgar, and Caradoc	Denmark; United Kingdom	The ship Ansgar collided with the ship Caradoc off Holyhead, Anglesey and both vessels foundered. Ansgar was on a voyage from Liverpool, Lancashire to Philadelphia, Pennsylvania, United States. Her crew were rescued by Emily McNear (United Kingdom). Caradoc was on a voyage from Liverpool to Singapore, Straits Settlements. Her crew were rescued.
Avalon	United Kingdom	The steamship ran aground on the Schulpen Plaat, in the North Sea off the coast of South Holland, Netherlands. She was refloated and taken in to Harwich, Essex.
Boomerang	United Kingdom	The ship ran aground in the Dardanelles. She was refloated.
Dazzler	United Kingdom	The ship ran aground on the Newcombe Sand, in the North Sea off the coast of Suffolk. She was refloated and assisted in to Lowestoft, Suffolk in a leaky condition.
Drie Gebroeders	Netherlands	The ship ran aground on the Jahde, in the North Sea. Her crew survived. She was on a voyage from West Wemyss, Fife, United Kingdom to Brouwershaven, Zeeland.
Eyra	Belgium	The ship ran aground off Zoutelande, Zeeland, Netherlands. She was on a voyage from Antwerp to an English port.
George Avery	United Kingdom	The barque ran aground on the North Rocks, off Heligoland. She was on a voyage from Akyab, Burma to Hamburg. She was refloated with assistance from the steamship Victoria (United Kingdom) but had to be beached on Heligoland, where she was wrecked.
Georgiana	United Kingdom	The ship was driven ashore and wrecked 8 nautical miles (15 km) east of Agrigento, Sicily, Italy with the loss of three of her crew.
Giovannino	Italy	The barque was driven ashore at Dunkirk, Nord, France. She was on a voyage from Callao, Peru to Dunkirk. She was refloated on 14 December and taken in to Dunkirk.
Odense	Denmark	The schooner ran aground off Stralsund. She was on a voyage from Stralsund to Antwerp.
Otto	Norway	The ship departed from "Laurkullen" for the Firth of Forth. No further trace, presumed foundered with the loss of all hands.
Primrose	United Kingdom	The ship sprang a leak and sank in the Atlantic Ocean. Her crew were rescued by Gertrude (United Kingdom).
Rhone	Netherlands	The steamship was wrecked on "Piana Island", off Cape Farina Beylik of Tunis with the loss of all but one of her 26 crew. She was on a voyage from Smyrna, Ottoman Empire to Amsterdam, North Holland, Netherlands.
Solon	Norway	The barque ran aground off Hanko, Grand Duchy of Finland. She was refloated and taken in to Helsinki, Grand Duchy of Finland.
Souchays	Ottoman Empire	The steamship ran aground in the Dardanelles. She was refloated.
St. Pierre	France	The ship was driven ashore 6 nautical miles (11 km) east of Licata. Her crew were rescued.
William Richardson	United Kingdom	The brig ran aground in the Moray Firth off Ethie Head, Ross-shire and was wrecked. Her crew were rescued. She was on a voyage from Quebec City, Canada to Inverness.

== 9 December ==
List of shipwrecks: 9 December 1870
Ship	State	Description
Adelaide	United Kingdom	The barge was driven ashore at Barnstaple, Devon in a capsized condition.
Bengollyn	United Kingdom	The ship was damaged by fire at Liverpool, Lancashire.
Chillas	Italy	The brigantine was wrecked at Bagnara Calabria.
City of Bristol	United Kingdom	The barque was wrecked on the Longsands, in the North Sea off the coast of Northumberland with the loss of two of her sixteen crew. Survivors were rescued by rocket apparatus.
Dasher	United Kingdom	The pilot cutter struck the Tusker Rock in the Bristol Channel and was wrecked. Her three crew were rescued by the Porthcawl Lifeboat Good Deliverance ( Royal National Lifeboat Institution).
Eagle	United Kingdom	The steamship ran aground on the Herd Sand, in the North Sea off the coast of County Durham. Her seventeen crew were rescued by the South Shields Lifeboat and another lifeboat. She was on a voyage from South Shields, County Durham to London.
Emalie	Norway	The schooner was wrecked at Tynemouth, Northumberland. All seven people on board were rescued. She was on a voyage from Stockholm to Grimsby, Lincolnshire, United Kingdom.
Marion	India	The ship was wrecked north of Singapore, Straits Settlements. Her crew were rescued. She was on a voyage from Calcutta to Cocanada.
Marsden	United Kingdom	The ship ran aground at Great Yarmouth, Norfolk. She was refloated with the assistance of a tug and taken in to Great Yarmouth.
Odense	Denmark	The ship was driven ashore at Stralsund. She was on a voyage from Stralsund to Antwerp, Belgium.
Peerless	United Kingdom	The ship foundered 70 nautical miles (130 km) north north west of Cape Horn, Chile. Her crew were rescued by the barque Elise Mathilde (Norway). Peerless was on a voyage from Newport to Coquimbo, Chile and/or Callao, Peru.
Piere Superior	France	The ship was driven ashore at Dunkirk, Nord. She was on a voyage from Callao, Peru to Dunkirk.
Red Cross Knight	Hamburg	The ship was damaged by fire at Hamburg. She was on a voyage from Hamburg to Valparaíso, Chile.
Samuel Barnard	United Kingdom	The schooner capsized off the mouth of the River Tyne with the loss of all fice crew.
San Demetrio	Italy	The ship was wrecked at Bagnara Calabria.
Sherbro' Hermann	Sweden	The schooner was driven ashore at Strandby, Denmark. She was on a voyage from Cimbritshamn to Ipswich, Suffolk, United Kingdom. She was refloated and taken in to Fredrikshavn, Denmark.
Venus	United Kingdom	The smack foundered on the Dogger Bank. Her crew were rescued.

== 10 December ==
List of shipwrecks: 10 December 1870
Ship	State	Description
A. B. Wyman	United States	The ship was destroyed by fire in the Atlantic Ocean (36°30′N 61°00′W). She was on a voyage from Savannah, Georgia to Liverpool, Lancashire, United Kingdom.
Floresta	Brazil	The schooner was wrecked between "Furado" and "Macabe".

== 11 December ==
List of shipwrecks: 11 December 1870
Ship	State	Description
Anns	United Kingdom	The smack foundered in the Bristol Channel. Her crew survived.
Eclipse	(United Kingdom of Great Britain and Ireland) Guernsey	The ship departed from Queenstown, County Cork for the Clyde. No further trace, presumed foundered with the loss of all hands.
Deva	New South Wales	The brig was abandoned 30 nautical miles (56 km) off Port Macquarie. She was on a voyage from New Caledonia to Newcastle.
Erne	United Kingdom	The ship was driven ashore at Dungeness, Kent. She was on a voyage from Foo Chow Foo, China to London. She was refloated and resumed her voyage.
Johanna	Denmark	The sschooner foundered off Bardsey Island, Pembrokeshire, United Kingdom. Her crew were rescued by Alma (United Kingdom). Johanna was on a voyage from Portmadoc, Caernarfonshire, United Kingdom to Copenhagen.
Pomona	Canada	The full-rigged ship was abandoned in the Atlantic Ocean. Her 25 crew were rescued by Apphia (United Kingdom). Pomona was on a voyage from Liverpool, Lancashire, United Kingdom to Philadelphia, Pennsylvania, United States.
Saxony	United Kingdom	The barque was destroyed by fire at Garrucha, Spain. Her crew were rescued. She was on a voyage from Palomares, Almería to the River Tyne.
Stjernen	Norway	The ship ran aground on the Whiting Sand, in the North Sea off the coast of Essex. She was on a voyage from Dram to Portsmouth, Hampshire, United Kingdom. She was refloated and taken in to Harwich, Essex in a waterlogged condition.

== 12 December ==
List of shipwrecks: 12 December 1870
Ship	State	Description
Alkko	(Russian Empire) Grand Duchy of Finland	The schooner was taken in to Rønne, Denmark in a waterlogged condition.
Argos	Italy	The ship was wrecked on the Longsand, in the North Sea off the coast of Essex, United Kingdom. All eleven people on board were rescued by a smack. She was on a voyage from Odesa, Russia to Ipswich, Suffolk, United Kingdom.
Hero	United Kingdom	The steamship was driven ashore on Skagen, Denmark. She was on a voyage from Hull, Yorkshire to Gothenburg, Sweden. She was refloated and completed her voyage.
Liebig	Flag unknown	The full-rigged ship was wrecked on Bakers Island, Massachusetts, United States.
Maren	Sweden	The ship ran aground on the Goodwin Sands, Kent, United Kingdom. She was on a voyage from Hamburg to "Porto Negro". She was refloated.

== 13 December ==
List of shipwrecks: 13 December 1870
Ship	State	Description
George and Ann	United Kingdom	The schooner was wrecked on the Longsand, in the North Sea off the coast of Essex. Her crew were rescued.
Mendoza	United Kingdom	The steamship ran aground in the Gulf of Smyrna. She was on a voyage from London to Smyrna, Ottoman Empire. She was refloated on 16 December with assistance from Austro-Hungarian Navy gunboats and towed in to Smyrna.

== 14 December ==
List of shipwrecks: 14 December 1870
Ship	State	Description
Aberdeenshire	United Kingdom	The brig capsized in the River Medway at Rochester, Kent. Her crew were rescued. She was righted.
Agenora	United States	The brig ran aground off the Poolbeg Lighthouse, County Dublin, United Kingdom and was wrecked. Her crew survived. She was on a voyage from New York to Dublin.
Celeste Adelaide	Italy	The barque was driven ashore and wrecked in Kirkonsland Bay, Argyllshire, United Kingdom. She was on a voyage from Londonerry to Troon, Ayrshire, United Kingdom.
Dovercourt	United Kingdom	The ship ran aground in the Saint Lawrence River. She was on a voyage from Quebec City, Canada to London. She was refloated and taken in to Pictou, Nova Scotia, Canada for repairs.
Earl of Seafield	United Kingdom	The sloop was driven ashore at Leven, Fife with the loss of all three crew. She was on a voyage from Fraserburgh, Aberdeenshire to Leith, Lothian. She subsequently became a wreck.
Ellen	United Kingdom	The ship was driven ashore at Arbroath, Forfarshire. She was on a voyage from Sunderland, County Durham to Arbroath.
Fingal	United Kingdom	The steamship arrived at Rotterdam, South Holland, Netherlands on fire. She was on a voyage from Leith to Rotterdam.
Forest Flower	United Kingdom	The barque was wrecked on the Corton Sand, in the North Sea off the coast of Suffolk.Her fifteen crew were rescued by the Lowestoft No.1 Lifeboat. She was on a voyage from Almería, Spain to Newcastle upon Tyne, Northumberland.
Gem	United Kingdom	The paddle tug sank at Greenock, Renfrewshire.
Hull	United Kingdom	The steamship was driven ashore south of Hirtshals, Denmark. She was on a voyage from Leith, Lothian to Pillau, Prussia.
Iberia	United Kingdom	The ship was wrecked at Castropol, Spain.
M. A. Jones	United Kingdom	The brig collided with the brig Leon ( (Russian Empire) ) Grand Duchy of Finland) and sank off Cape Matapan, Greece. Her crew were rescued by the barque Si (Italy). M. A. Jones was on a voyage from Gemlik, Ottoman Empire to the Clyde.
St. Clair	United Kingdom	The schooner was driven ashore at Aberdeen. She was on a voyage from Thurso, Caithness to Leith. She was refloated on 19 December.

== 15 December ==
List of shipwrecks: 15 December 1870
Ship	State	Description
Aggie M.	United Kingdom	The ship departed from Cardiff, Glamorgan for Manila, Spanish East Indies. No further trace, presumed foundered with the loss of all hands.
Amanda	Prussia	The schooner was wrecked at the mouth of the Eider. Her crew were rescued. She was on a voyage from Hartlepool, County Durham, United Kingdom to Tönning.
Amica	United Kingdom	The barque was driven ashore and wrecked at Kinsale, County Cork.
Betty	United Kingdom	The ship was driven ashore at West Hartlepool, County Durham. She was being towed from Hartlepool to West Hartlepool. She was later refloated and taken in to West Hartlepool.
Drydens, and Fire Queen	United Kingdom	The barque Drydens collided with the steamship Fire Queen and sank at Queenstown, County Cork. Her crew were rescued. She was on a voyage from Odesa, Russia to Queenstown. Fire Queen was on a voyage from New Orleans, Louisiana, United States to Liverpool, Lancashire. She was beached on the Spit Bank.
Flora, and Prima	United Kingdom; Prussia	The steamship Flora collided with the steamship Prima and sank off Burntisland, Fife. Her eighteen crew were rescued. Flora was on a voyage from Dunkirk, Nord, France to Grangemouth, Stirlingshire. Prima was on a voyage from Grangemouth to Flensburg. She put in to Leith, Lothian, where she was beached.
Fremad	Norway	The barque sprang a leak and was beached near Skudesneshavn. Her crew were rescued. She was on a voyage from London to Mandal.
George Todd	United Kingdom	The ship capsized and sank in the Atlantic Ocean. Her crew were rescued. She was on a voyage from Saint George, New Brunswick, Canada to Havana, Cuba.
Jessie	United Kingdom	The schooner was wrecked on the Harris Sandbank, in the Irish Sea off the coast of Lancashire. Her five crew were rescued by the Southport Lifeboat Jessie Knowles ( Royal National Lifeboat Institution). Jessie was on a voyage from Dublin to Liverpool.
Jeune Emilie	France	The ship sank at Dunkirk, Nord.
Juno	United Kingdom	The steamship was wrecked at Farsund, Norway with the loss of three of her crew. She was on a voyage from Hull, Yorkshire to Stettin and Danzig.
Oscar I	Norway	The brig ran aground at Seaham, County Durham. She was on a voyage from Seaham to Christiania. She was refloated and towed in to South Shields in a leaky condition.
HMS Psyche	Royal Navy	The Psyche-class dispatch vessel was wrecked in the Mediterranean Sea off Catania, Sicily, Italy.
Rapid	United Kingdom	The tug was driven ashore at Culross, Fife.
Suzanne	United Kingdom	The steamship was driven ashore at Berwick upon Tweed, Northumberland. She was on a voyage from Berwick upon Tweed to London. She was refloated the next day and taken in to Berwick upon Tweed.
Torrance	United Kingdom	The sbrig collided with the brig Celestial ( (Netherlands) Surinam) and the barque Echo (United Kingdom) and was abandoned by her crew. Torrance was subsequently discovered by Dart ( (United Kingdom of Great Britain and Ireland) Jersey), which put two of her crew aboard. She was towed in to Troon, Ayrshire by the steamship Enterprise ( (United Kingdom of Great Britain and Ireland) Jersey) on 15 December.
Victoria	United Kingdom	The steamship was driven ashore and wrecked 4 nautical miles (7.4 km) west of North Berwick, Lothian. Her crew were rescued. She was on her maiden voyage, from Kirkcaldy, Fife to London.

== 16 December ==
List of shipwrecks: 16 December 1870
Ship	State	Description
Alexander	United Kingdom	The barque was driven ashore at Canovan Point, County Cork. She was refloated on 20 December and towed in to Queenstown, County Cork for repairs.
Bolderaa	United Kingdom	The ship was driven ashore and wrecked on the east coast of Öland, Sweden. She was on a voyage from Reval, Russia to London.
Eleanor	United Kingdom	The steamship was run into by the steamship John Elder (United Kingdom) and sank at Le Verdon-sur-Mer, Gironde, France with the loss of two lives. She was on a voyage from Bordeaux, Gironde to Dublin and Glasgow, Renfrewshire.
Emilie	Sweden	The ship was wrecked at Klitmøller Denmark. Her crew were rescued. She was on a voyage from Gothenburg to Plymouth, Devon, United Kingdom.
Falcon	United Kingdom	The barque ran aground on the Cross Sand, in the North Sea off the coast of Norfolk. She was on a voyage from Sunderland, County Durham to Littlehampton, Sussex. She was refloated and resumed her voyage.
Georgia	United Kingdom	The ship sprang a leak and sank in the Atlantic Ocean. Four of her crew were rescued. She was on a voyage from Saint Stephen, New Brunswick, Canada to Havana, Cuba.
James Renforth	United Kingdom	The steamship was driven ashore at Marsden, County Durham. She was on a voyage from the River Tyne to Stockton-on-Tees, County Durham.
Maggie Hammond	United Kingdom	The ship was damaged by fire at Liverpool, Lancashire.
Mary	United Kingdom	The ship was wrecked on Lundy Island, Devon. Her crew were rescued. She was on a voyage from Swansea, Glamorgan to Bordeaux, Gironde, France.
Norfolk	United Kingdom	The brigantine was driven ashore at Carrick. She was on a voyage from Belfast, County Antrim to Maryport, Cumberland.
Oswego	United Kingdom	The brigantine was driven ashore near Brodick, Isle of Arran. She was on a voyage from Belfast, County Antrim to Troon, Ayrshire.
Pacific	United Kingdom	The steamship was driven ashore at Altenbruch. She was on a voyage from Hamburg to Sunderland, County Durham. She was refloated on 16 December.
Petrel	United Kingdom	The schooner was driven ashore near Port Logan, Wigtownshire. She was on a voyage from Red Bay, County Antrim to Maryport, Cumberland.
Waterwitch	United Kingdom	The ship was driven ashore near "Ballycronane". She was on a voyage from Swansea, Glamorgan to "Ballydonogom Bay". She was refloated and taken in to "Ballycronane" in a waterlogged condition.

== 17 December ==
List of shipwrecks: 17 December 1870
Ship	State	Description
Adelheid Bertha	Prussia	The ship ran aground at Pillau. She was on a voyage from Liverpool, Lancashire, United Kingdom to Pillau. She was refloated and taken in to Pillau.
Andaman	United Kingdom	The ship ran aground in the Clyde at Paisley, Renfrewshire whilst trying to pass the wreck of Antilles (United Kingdom). She was on a voyage from the Clyde to Bombay, India.
Antilles	United Kingdom	The barque collided with the steamship Anglia (United Kingdom) and sank in the Clyde at Paisley. Her crew survived. Antilles was on a voyage from New York, United States to Glasgow, Renfrewshire.
Cognac	United Kingdom	The steamship ran aground in the Clyde a Paisley whilst trying to pass the wreck of Antilles (United Kingdom).
Elizabeth	United Kingdom	The ship was driven ashore west of Blakeney, Norfolk. Her crew were rescued. She was on a voyage from Goole, Yorkshire to Bridport, Dorset.
Ensign	United Kingdom	The brig was driven ashore on Little Cumbrae, Argyllshire and was severely damaged. All on board were rescued. She was being towed from Belfast, County Antrim to Greenock, Renfrewshire by the tug Renown (United Kingdom). Temporary repairs were made with assistance from the crew of HMS Jackal (Royal Navy) and she was towed in to Glasgow, Renfrewshire on 20 December for repairs.
Fairbanks	United States	The steamship was destroyed by fire in the Hatteras Inlet. Her crew were rescued. She was on a voyage from Wilmington, Delaware to New York.
Hope On	United Kingdom	The brig collided with the brig Eugenie (United Kingdom) and sank off Lowestoft, Suffolk with the loss of four of her seven crew. Survivors were rescued by Eugenie. Hope on was on a voyage from Blyth, Northumberland to Fécamp, Seine-Inférieure, France.
Lothair	United Kingdom	The ship was driven ashore west of Blakeney. Her crew were rescued. She was on a voyage from Ystad, Sweden to London.
Marshland	United Kingdom	The steamship was driven ashore on Vormsi, Russia. She was abandoned by her crew on 20 December. Marshland was on a voyage from Hull, Yorkshire to Helsinki, Grand Duchy of Finland. She was declared a total loss.
M. R.	France	The derelict brigantine was towed in to Scarborough, Yorkshire, United Kingdom by the fishing smack Mary Ann (United Kingdom).

== 18 December ==
List of shipwrecks: 18 December 1870
Ship	State	Description
Belhaven	United Kingdom	The schooner was driven ashore at Newburgh, Aberdeenshire. Her four crew survived. She was on a voyage from Clackmannan to Portsoy, Aberdeenshire.
Blyth	United Kingdom	The brig was wrecked on the Longsand, in the North Sea off the coast of Essex. Her crew were rescued. She was on a voyage from Libava, Courland Governorate to London.
Fearless	United Kingdom	The brigantine collided with Corona (United Kingdom) and was abandoned in the English Channel off Beachy Head, Sussex. Her crew were rescued by Emerald Isle (United States). Fearless was on a voyage from London to Philadelphia, Pennsylvania, United States.
Flora	United Kingdom	The brigantine was driven ashore on Holy Isle, in the Firth of Clyde. She was on a voyage from Belfast, County Antrim to Ardrossan, Ayrshire. She was refloated on 20 December.
Nick Wall	United States	The steamboat ran aground and was wrecked in the Mississippi River 3 nautical miles (5.6 km) from Memphis, Tennessee with the loss of about 100 lives. Survivors were rescued by the steamboat Seminole (United States).
Ocean Child	United Kingdom	The brigantine was wrecked west of Ceará, Brazil. Her crew were rescued. She was on a voyage from Ceará to a Channel port.
Transfer	United States	The schooner was abandoned in the Atlantic Ocean. Her crew were rescued by Belle Morse (United States). Transfer was on a voyage from Portland, Maine to Baltimore, Maryland.
Ville de Malaga	Belgium	The steamship was driven ashore at Borssele, Zeeland, Netherlands. She was refloated and resumed her voyage.

== 19 December ==
List of shipwrecks: 19 December 1870
Ship	State	Description
Agnes	United Kingdom	The sloop capsized off Souter Point, Northumberland. Her crew were rescued by a tug, which towed Agnes in to Sunderland, County Durham.
Brisk	Canada	The brigantine was driven ashore and wrecked in Cymryan Bay with the loss of two of her crew. She was on a voyage from New York, United States to Liverpool, Lancashire, United Kingdom.
Ferdinand	Danzig	The ship ran and sank aground between Borkum and Rottum, Prussia. She was on a voyage from Danzig to Leer, Prussia. She was refloated.
Firm	(United Kingdom of Great Britain and Ireland) Isle of Man	The trawl boat was driven ashore and wrecked at Douglas with the loss of two of her three crew.
Golden Spring	United Kingdom	The barque was abandoned in the Dogger Bank. Her crew were rescued by Dagmar (Norway). Golden Spring was on a voyage from Vyborg, Grand Duchy of Finland to Hartlepool, County Durham. She was towed in to South Shields on 28 December by the tug Reliance (United Kingdom).
Johann Heinrich	Lübeck	The ship was wrecked off Travemünde, Prussia. She was on a voyage from Sunderland to Lübeck.
John Fyfe	United Kingdom	The ship caught fire at Liverpool and was scuttled. She was on a voyage from Charleston, South Carolina, United States to Liverpool. She was refloated in late December.
Pearl	(United Kingdom of Great Britain and Ireland) Isle of Man	The smack was abandoned in Ramsey Bay. Her crew were rescued by the Ramsey Lifeboat. She was on a voyage from Ramsey to Douglas. Pearl was driven ashore and wrecked.
Peter Johns	Denmark	The barque was run into by the steamship Sappho (Netherlands) and sank at Copenhagen.
Profit and Loss	United Kingdom	The ship was driven ashore at Islandmagee, County Antrim. She was on a voyage from Londonderry to New Ross, County Wexford. She was refloated.
Sarah L. Hall	United Kingdom	The ship ran aground at Cardiff, Glamorgan. She was refloated and taken in to Cardiff.
Virgen de Begona	Spain	The full-rigged ship was run down and sunk off Dungeness, Kent, United Kingdom by the full-rigged ship Baynton (United States). Virgen de Begona was on a voyage from Ponce, Puerto Rico to Hamburg.

== 20 December ==
List of shipwrecks: 20 December 1870
Ship	State	Description
Alexander Murray	United Kingdom	The schooner ran aground off Pakefield, Suffolk. She was on a voyage from Aberdeen to London. She was refloated and taken in to Lowestoft, Suffolk to repair a leak.
Ann	United Kingdom	The brigantine was driven ashore at Withernsea, Yorkshire. Her crew were rescued by the Withernsea Lifeboat. Ann was on a voyage from Hartlepool, County Durham to Lowestoft. She broke up the next day.
Charity	United Kingdom	The brig was beached in the River Medway at Chatham, Kent. She was on a voyage from Grimsby, Lincolnshire to Chatham.
Harbottle Castle	United Kingdom	The schooner foundered off Girdleness, Aberdeenshire with the loss of all five crew. She was on a voyage from Newcastle upon Tyne, Northumberland to Aberdeen.
Isabella Davidson	United Kingdom	The schooner was wrecked at Aberdeen. Both crew were rescued by the Aberdeen Lifeboat. She was on a voyage from Kennetpans, Clackmannanshire to Inverness.
Johan Cæsar	Hamburg	The ship was wrecked on Fetlar, Shetland Islands, United Kingdom. Her eight crew survived. She was on a voyage from Hamburg to the South Sea Islands.
Union	United Kingdom	The barque was driven ashore and capsized at South Shields, County Durham. Her ten crew were rescued by rocket apparatus. Union was on a voyage from London to South Shields. She was wrecked.
Two unnamed vessels	United Kingdom	Franco-Prussian War: The schooners were scuttled by the Prussians in the Seine at Duclair, Seine-Inférieure, France. Their crews were taken prisoner.

== 21 December ==
List of shipwrecks: 21 December 1870
Ship	State	Description
Active	United Kingdom	The ship ran aground and was wrecked near Vlissingen, Zeeland, Netherlands. Her eight crew took to a boat, but one of them died before they were rescued the next day by the fishing boat Saint Omar (France). Active was on a voyage from Antwerp, Belgium to Newcastle upon Tyne, Northumberland.
Alpha	Denmark	The schooner was driven ashore and wrecked at Grenaa, Denmark. She was on a voyage from Hull, Yorkshire, United Kingdom to Kiel, Prussia.
Bexhill	United Kingdom	The ship was driven ashore and severely damaged at Shoreham-by-Sea, Sussex. She was on a voyage from Newcastle upon Tyne, Northumberland to Shoreham-by-Sea.
Blossom	United Kingdom	The schooner was driven ashore and wrecked at Berwick upon Tweed, Northumberland with the loss of all five crew. She was on a voyage from South Shields, County Durham to Aberdeen.
Emilia	Argentina	The lighter was wrecked in the Canaleta del Riachuelo.
Eva Maria	United Kingdom	The schooner ran aground on the Nore. She was on a voyage from Leith, Lothian to London. She was refloated and towed to London in a severely damaged condition.
Glenelg	United Kingdom	The ship departed from Penarth, Glamorgan for Maranhão, Brazil. No further trace, presumed foundered with the loss of all hands.
Kate	(United Kingdom of Great Britain and Ireland) Isle of Man	The smack was driven ashore and wrecked at Douglas Head. Her crew were rescued. She was on a voyage from Laxey to Maryport, Cumberland.
Lake Michigan	United Kingdom	The full-rigged ship ran aground in the Clyde at Paisley, Renfrewshire.
Northumberland	United Kingdom	The steamship ran aground at Cardiff, Glamorgan.
Norval	United Kingdom	The ship was driven ashore and wrecked on Sheep Island, Argyllshire. Her crew were rescued She was on a voyage from Montreal, Quebec, Canada to Glasgow, Renfrewshire.
Rapid	United Kingdom	The fishing smack was wrecked at the Landguard Fort, Felixtowe, Suffolk. Her crew were rescued.
Renovator	United Kingdom	The ship was wrecked at Berwick upon Tweed with the loss of all but one of her crew.
Scotia	Norway	The brig was wrecked at Muchalls, Kincardineshire, United Kingdom to Grimstad with the loss of four of her seven crew. She was on a voyage from Hull to Aberdeen.
Ulva	United Kingdom	The full-rigged ship ran aground in the Clyde at Paisley.
Ville d'Anvers	Belgium	The barque capsized and sank at South Shields, County Durham, United Kingdom. Her eight crew were rescued. She was being towed from South Shields to North Shields, Northumberland. Ville d'Anvers was refloated on 28 December and beached.
Unnamed	Flag unknown	The schooner ran aground on the Tongue Sand and sank.

== 22 December ==
List of shipwrecks: 22 December 1870
Ship	State	Description
Alice	United Kingdom	Franco-Prussian War: The collier was sunk by the Prussians in the Seine at Duclair, Seine-Inférieure, France. Her crew survived.
Ann	United Kingdom	Franco-Prussian War: The collier was sunk by the Prussians in the Seine at Duclair. Her crew survived.
August	Denmark	The schooner was driven ashore at Fjällbacka, Sweden with the loss of all but two of her crew. She was on a voyage from an English port to Stettin.
George	United Kingdom	The ship ran aground at "Paggus". She was on a voyage from Rotterdam, South Holland, Netherlands to Gloucester.
Jane Tindall	United Kingdom	Franco-Prussian War: The collier, a brig, was sunk by the Prussians in the Seine at Duclair. Her crew survived.
Jessamine	United Kingdom	Franco-Prussian War: The collier was sunk by the Prussians in the Seine at Duclair. Her crew survived.
Juno	United Kingdom	Franco-Prussian War: The ship was sunk by the Prussians in the Seine at Duclair.
Margaret and Ann	United Kingdom	The schooner ran aground on the Mussel Scarp. She was on a voyage from Sunderland, County Durham to Dover, Kent.
Mary and Elizabeth	United Kingdom	The ship was driven ashore in the Urr Water and was abandoned by her crew. She was on a voyage from Bangor to Dalbeattie, Kirkcudbrightshire. She was refloated and beached.
M'Laren	United Kingdom	Franco-Prussian War: The collier was sunk by the Prussians in the Seine at Duclair. Her crew survived.
Paragon	United Kingdom	Franco-Prussian War: The ship was sunk by the Prussians in the Seine at Duclair.
Peter	United Kingdom	The brig ran aground off the Owers Lightship ( Trinity House) and was abandoned by her crew, who were rescued. She was on a voyage from Blyth, Northumberland to Lisbon, Portugal.
Sally Gale	United Kingdom	Franco-Prussian War: The collier was sunk by the Prussians in the Seine at Duclair. Her crew survived.
San Antonio	Italy	The brig sprang a leak and was beached at Cape Spartivento, Sardinia. She was on a voyage from Marianople, Russia to an English port. She had become a wreck by 5 January 1871.
Sarepta	United Kingdom	The brig was driven ashore and wrecked at Todhead, Aberdeenshire with the loss of three of her seven crew. She was on a voyage from Boulogne, Pas-de-Calais, France to Amble, Northumberland
Scotia	Norway	The ship was wrecked at Aberdeen, United Kingdom with the loss of three of her crew. She was on a voyage from Grimstad to Aberdeen.
Seraph	United Kingdom	The ship was driven ashore and wrecked at Kinneff, Kincardineshire with the loss of four of her eight crew.
St. Joseph	Canada	The brigantine was driven ashore at Crookhaven, County Cork, United Kingdom. She was on a voyage from Quebec City to Queenstown, County Cork. She was refloated.
Sylph	United Kingdom	Franco-Prussian War: The ship was sunk by the Prussians in the Seine at Duclair.
Tees	United Kingdom	The steamship sank in the River Tees at Stockton-on-Tees, County Durham. She was on a voyage from Stockton-on-Tees to Havre de Grâce, Seine-Inférieure, France.

== 23 December ==
List of shipwrecks: 23 December 1870
Ship	State	Description
Aries	United Kingdom	The steamship ran aground at Henford, Pennsylvania, United States with the loss of seven of her crew. She was refloated and taken in to Philadelphia, Pennsylvania in a wrecked condition.
Baltar	Portugal	The schooner was driven ashore and wrecked at "Senhora da Areio Mathozinhas". She was on a voyage from Quebec City, Canada to Porto.
Clarendon	United Kingdom	The ship was wrecked at the Turneffe Atoll, British Honduras.
Conception	France	The brig collided with the barque Carrie (United States) and foundered off the Isles of Scilly, United Kingdom with the loss of two of her nine crew. Survivors were rescued by Carrie. Conception was on a voyage from Newport, Monmouthshire, United Kingdom to Barcelona, Spain.
Joseph Hume	United Kingdom	The ship was wrecked at Fjällbacka, Sweden with the loss of six of her crew. She was on a voyage from Leith, Lothian to Kiel, Prussia.
Magdala	United Kingdom	The ship ran aground at Saint John, New Brunswick, Canada. She was on a voyage from Saint John to Liverpool. She was refloated on 31 December and taken in to Saint John for repairs.
Trois Sœurs	France	The ship foundered off the Glénan Islands, Finistère. She was on a voyage from Bilbao, Spain to Cardiff, Glamorgan, United Kingdom.

== 24 December ==
List of shipwrecks: 24 December 1870
Ship	State	Description
Antonio	United Kingdom	The steamship ran aground on the Dunball, in the River Avon. She was on a voyage from Bristol, Gloucestershire to Glasgow, Renfrewshire. She was refloated on 8 January 1871 and resumed her voyage.
Arcana	France	The cutter was wrecked at Saint Peter Port, Guernsey, Channel Islands. Her crew survived. She was on a voyage from Cherbourg, Seine-Inférieure to a port in Brittany.
Astrid	Sweden	The barque ran aground on the Leman Sands, in the North Sea. She was on a voyage from Christiania, Norway to Rio de Janeiro, Brazil. She was refloated and put in to Grimsby, Lincolnshire, United Kingdom in a leaky condition.
Clarendon	United Kingdom	The ship was wrecked on the Soubie Reef, in the South China Sea with some loss of life. She was on a voyage from Saigon, French Indo-China to Hong Kong.
Eaglescliffe No. 2	United Kingdom	The steamship was driven ashore. She was on a voyage from Stockton-on-Tees, County Durham to London. She was refloated and put into Lowestoft, Suffolk in a leaky condition.
Eleanore	Bremen	The ship ran aground on the Tegeler Sand, in the North Sea. Her crew were rescued. She was on a voyage from Burntisland, Fife, United Kingdom to Bremen.
Eliza Thornton	United Kingdom	The barque was driven ashore in Gibraltar Bay. She was on a voyage from Odesa, Russia to Falmouth, Cornwall. She had been refloated by 29 December and found to be severely leaky. She was consequently condemned.
General Battle	Argentina	The steamship foundered off "Rat Island", Argentina.
Jeune Daniel	France	The lugger sprang a leak and foundered off Padstow, Cornwall. Her crew were rescued by the schooner Saite (France). Jeune Daniel was on a voyage from Newport, Monmouthshire, United Kingdom to Les Sables d'Olonne, Vendée.
Leeming	United Kingdom	The steamship was wrecked 10 nautical miles (19 km) south of Figueira da Foz, Portugal with the loss of all but one of her 21 crew. She was on a voyage from Cardiff, Glamorgan to Gibraltar.
Magda	Norway	The brig was wrecked near "Laurkullen". Her crew were rescued. She was on a voyage from Hartlepool, County Durham to Horten.
Newton	United Kingdom	The barque was abandoned at sea. Her crew were rescued. She was on a voyage from Odesa to Falmouth or Queenstown, County Cork.
T. S. Reeves	United Kingdom	The schooner was driven ashore at Ballinagaol, County Waterford. She was on a voyage form the Cardiff, Glamorgan to Kinsale, County Cork.
Ulpiano	Spain	The barque was stranded on the Süderoogsand, offFöhr, Prussia 54.425°N 8.478889°E
Vectis	United Kingdom	The brig sprang a leak and foundered off Dale, Pembrokeshire. Her crew were rescued. She was on a voyage from Newport to Lisbon, Portugal.
Unnamed	United Kingdom	Franco-Prussian War: The collier was seized by the Prussians and scuttled at Duclair, Seine-Inférieure, France.

== 25 December ==
List of shipwrecks: 25 December 1870
Ship	State	Description
City of Sparta	United Kingdom	The ship ran aground in the Clyde upstream of Dumbarton. She was on a voyage from the clyde to Calcutta, India. She was refloated in mid-January 1871 and towed in to Glasgow, Renfrewshire.
Flora	United Kingdom	The schooner was driven ashore north of Mundesley, Norfolk. Her five crew were rescued by the Mundesley Lifeboat Grocers ( Royal National Lifeboat Institution).
Hannibal	United Kingdom	The ship was wrecked at "Landeyjar", Iceland. Her crew were rescued.
Isabella	United States	The barque was driven ashore on Heligoland. She was on a voyage from Philadelphia, Pennsylvania to Bremen.
Maria	Norway	The ship ran aground on the Koster Scheere, off Strömstad before 25 December. Her crew were rescued.
Minerva	United Kingdom	The collier, a brig was driven ashore and wrecked at Walcott, Norfolk. Her seven crew were rescued by the Ostend Lifeboat Huddersfield ( Royal National Lifeboat Institution). Minerva was on a voyage from Seaham, County Durham to Rochester, Kent.
Minos	United Kingdom	The steamship lost her propeller and sank in the North Sea. Her crew were rescued by Gipsy Queen (United Kingdom). Minos was on a voyage from Burntisland Fife to Geestemünde, Prussia.
Stad Appingedam	Netherlands	The ship was wrecked in the West Indies. She was on a voyage from London, United Kingdom to Colón, United States of Colombia.
Three unnamed vessels	France	The ships were wrecked at Marseille, Bouches-du-Rhône. Their crews were rescued.

== 26 December ==
List of shipwrecks: 26 December 1870
Ship	State	Description
Annie	United Kingdom	The brig was driven ashore in Ballycotton Bay. She was on a voyage from the Bristol Channel to Cork.
Assomption	France	The ship foundered 8 nautical miles (15 km) off the Pointe de Grave, Landes. Her crew were rescued.
Don Quichotte	Belgium	The brigantine collided with the schooner Billow (United Kingdom) and sank in the English Channel off the Isle of Wight, United Kingdom with the loss of four of her eight crew. Don Quichotte was on a voyage from Liverpool, Lancashire, United Kingdom to Ostend, West Flanders.
Ella Maria	Prussia	The ship was lost in ice in the Jahde. Her crew were rescued. She was on a voyage from Newcastle upon Tyne, Northumberland, United Kingdom to Wilhelmshaven.
Jantina Catrina	Flag unknown	The ship was driven ashore by ice at "Hornmersiel", Prussia. Her crew were rescued.
Jupiter	Norway	The ship was driven ashore near "Tvisten" with the loss of all hands. She was on a voyage from Charleston, South Carolina to Larvik.
Kate	United Kingdom	The brigantine heeled over at Dundalk, County Louth. She filled when the tide rose.
Saucy Jack	United Kingdom	The ship was driven ashore at Brae, Shetland Islands.
Warren	Canada	The ship was sighted off Beachy Head, Sussex, United Kingdom whilst on a voyage from Antwerp, Belgium to New York, United States. No further trace, presumed foundered with the loss of all hands.

== 27 December ==
List of shipwrecks: 27 December 1870
Ship	State	Description
Agenoria	United Kingdom	The ship was wrecked on the Buxey Sand, in the North Sea off the coast of Essex. Her crew were rescued. She was on a voyage from Leith, Lothian to London.
Aline	United Kingdom	The barque was driven ashore in Pegwell Bay. She was on a voyage from Dunkirk, Nord, France to London. She was refloated and assisted in to Ramsgate, Kent.
Aurora	United Kingdom	The steamship was damaged by fire at Naples, Italy. She was on a voyage from Livorno, Italy to London.
Freihandel	Bremen	The ship was driven into the steamship Douan (Flag unknown) by ice and then ran aground on the Mellumplatte, in the North Sea. Her crew were rescued by Douan. Freihandel was on a voyage from Burntisland to Bremen.
Isabella	United Kingdom	The ship was driven ashore at Eartholmen Denmark. She was on a voyage from Danzig to Leith.
Kitty	United Kingdom	The schooner ran aground on the Mellumplatte. Her crew were rescued.
Lass o'Gowrie	United Kingdom	The ship stuck a sunken pile and sank at Dunkirk. She was on a voyage from Dunkirk to Ipswich, Suffolk.
Magnet	United Kingdom	The steamship was driven ashore in the Belfast Lough. She was on a voyage from Rotterdam, South Holland, Netherlands to Belfast, County Antrim.
Norden	Prussia	The brig ran aground on the Haisborough Sands, in the North Sea off the coast of Norfolk, United Kingdom and was abandoned by her crew. She was on a voyage from Newcastle upon Tyne, Northumberland, United Kingdom to Alexandria, Egypt. She was refloated and taken in to Lowestoft, Suffolk by the steamship Kirstall (United Kingdom and was beached at Pakefield, where she became a wreck.
Nordstern	Norway	The ship was driven ashore on Skagen, Denmark. She was refloated and take in to Grimstad in a leaky condition.
Paul and Marie	United Kingdom	The ship was wrecked on Scharhörn, Hamburg. Her crew were rescued. She was on a voyage from Sunderland, County Durham to Stettin.
Primrose	United Kingdom	The ship sprang a leak and sank 7 nautical miles (13 km) south of Aberystwyth, Cardiganshire. Her crew survived.
Rhare	United Kingdom	The ship was driven ashore at Happisburgh, Norfolk. She was refloated and taken in to Lowestoft in a severely leaky condition.
Trial	United Kingdom	The ship was driven ashore and severely damaged at Runswick Bay, Yorkshire.

== 28 December ==
List of shipwrecks: 28 December 1870
Ship	State	Description
Active	United Kingdom	The ship foundered in the North Sea 22 nautical miles (41 km) north of Ostend, West Flanders, Belgium.
Arabella	United Kingdom	The schooner collided with the steamship Olympus (United Kingdom) and was abandoned off Cape Roca, Portugal with the loss of three of her crew. Survivors were rescued by Olympus. Arabella was on a voyage from "Laga Buoto" to Dublin.
Clara	United Kingdom	The steamship was driven ashore in the Guadalquivir. She was on a voyage from Pomaron to Lisbon, Portugal. She was refloated on 22 January 1871.
Hydra	Prussia	The ship sank at Geestemünde. She was on a voyage from Cienfuegos, Cuba to Geestemünde.
Rota	Norway	The barque was abandoned at sea. Her crew were rescued. She was on a voyage from Cardiff, Glamorgan, United Kingdom to Barcelona, Spain.
Wanderer	United States	The schooner was wrecked on the Colorado Reef, off the coast of Cuba. Her crew were rescued by Manuelita ( (Spain) Cuba. Wanderer was on a voyage from Havana, Cuba to Philadelphia, Pennsylvania.

== 29 December ==
List of shipwrecks: 29 December 1870
Ship	State	Description
Caroline Goodyear	United Kingdom	The ship was damaged by fire at Hamburg.
Ellen	United Kingdom	The ship was driven ashore at Buckie, Banffshire. She was on a voyage from Lossiemouth, Lothian to Buckie.
Gloria Deo	Hamburg	The galliot sank in the Elbe downstream of Cuxhaven. She was on a voyage from Aberdeen, United Kingdom to Altona.
John and Mary	United Kingdom	The schooner was driven ashore by ice at Store Heddinge, Denmark. Her crew were rescued. She was on a voyage from Danzig to Alloa, Clackmannanshire. She was consequently condemned.
Liberal	United Kingdom	The ship was wrecked on Langeoog, Prussia. Three of the sixteen people on board were reported missing. The rest were rescued by a lifeboat. She was on a voyage from Grimsby, Lincolnshire to Hamburg.
Thusuelda	Bremen	The ship was wrecked on Langeoog. Three of the sixteen people on board were reported Missing. She was on a voyage from Philadelphia, Pennsylvania, United States to Bremen.
Victoria	United Kingdom	The schooner sprang a leak and was beached at Milford Haven, Pembrokeshire, where she subsequently sank. Her crew survived. She was on a voyage from Bangor to Poole, Dorset.
Wanderer	Rostock	Franco-Prussian War: The ship, which had been captured by a French navy warship and was under the charge of a prize crew, was run down and sunk in the Atlantic Ocean by Vityaz (Imperial Russian Navy) with the loss of two lives. Wanderer had been on a voyage from Liverpool, Lancashire, United Kingdom to Rosario, Argentina.
Unnamed	Flag unknown	The ship collided with the schooner Accra (United Kingdom) and foundered in the Irish Sea off Holyhead, Anglesey, United Kingdom.

== 30 December ==
List of shipwrecks: 30 December 1870
Ship	State	Description
Elizabeth Ann Bright	United Kingdom	The ship sprang a leak and was beached at Lisbon, Portugal. She was on a voyage from Oran, Algeria to the Clyde. She was destroyed by fire on 5 January 1871.
Gio Battista O.	Italy	The ship struck the wreck of Antilles (United Kingdom) in the Clyde and was holed at the bows. She was on a voyage from Glasgow, Renfrewshire, United Kingdom to Odesa, Russia. She put back to Glasgow.
Pilgrim	United Kingdom	The fishing smack collided with the steamship Despatch (United Kingdom) and foundered in the North Sea 30 nautical miles (56 km) off Spurn Point, Yorkshire with the loss of three of her five crew. Survivors were rescued by Despatch.
Sappho	(Canada)	The brig was wrecked at Cape George, Nova Scotia. She was on a voyage from Liverpool, Lancashire, United Kingdom to Charlottetown, Prince Edward Island.
Wolfe	United Kingdom	The steamship was driven ashore at the mouth of the River Cart. She was on a voyage from Londonderry to the Clyde.

== 31 December ==
List of shipwrecks: 31 December 1870
Ship	State	Description
Bonnie Lass	United Kingdom	The schooner was damaged by ice at Bonar Bridge, Sutherland.
De Soto	United States	The steamship was destroyed by fire in the Mississippi River downstream of New Orleans, Louisiana. She was on a voyage from New Orleans to New York.
Lady McDonald	United Kingdom	The ship was driven ashore by ice at the mouth of the Geeste. She was on a voyage from Bremen to New York, United States. She was later refloated and taken in to Geestemünde.
Michele	Flag unknown	The ship was wrecked at "Rinopolis". She was on a voyage from Odesa, Russia to a British port.
Paragon	United Kingdom	The schooner was driven ashore at Burghead, Moray. She was refloated the next day and taken in to Burghead in a leaky condition.
Patience	United Kingdom	The brig ran aground at Portland, Dorset. She was on a voyage from Portland to Cherbourg, Seine-Inférieure.
Rhodas	(United Kingdom of Great Britain and Ireland) Guernsey	The schooner caught fire and sank in the River Thames at Blackwall, Middlesex.
Sea Flower	United Kingdom	The schooner was wrecked at Lybster, Caithness. Her crew were rescued.
Waverley	United Kingdom	The barque was wrecked on Hesselø, Denmark. Her crew survived. She was on a voyage from Danzig to Hartlepool, County Durham.
Westenhope	(United Kingdom of Great Britain and Ireland) Cape Colony	The steamship was wrecked on Bird Island. She was on a voyage from Port Elizabeth to the Colony of Natal.

== Unknown date ==
List of shipwrecks: Unknown date in December 1870
Ship	State	Description
Adda	Netherlands	The barque was lost near Castillos, Uruguay. Her crew were rescued. She was on a voyage from Buenos Aires, Argentina to an English port.
Advance	United Kingdom	The steamship ran aground on the Juelsand after 16 December. She was on a voyage from Gothenburg, Sweden to London. She was refloated and resumed her voyage. Advance did not complete her voyage and was presumed to have foundered with the loss of all 21 crew.
Æolus	Bremen	The barque sprang a leak and foundered in the Atlantic Ocean. Her crew were rescued by the barque Dorothy Thomson (United Kingdom). Æolus was on a voyage from the Gulf of Mexico to Bremen.
Aglae	United Kingdom	The barque foundered off the Lemon and Ower Sand, in the North Sea with the loss of all hands after 12 December. She was on a voyage from Chiltepec, Mexico to Newcastle upon Tyne, Northumberland.
Aimable Jeune	France	The ship ran aground on the Shears. She was on a voyage from Liverpool, Lancashire to Philadelphia, Pennsylvania, United States. She was refloated.
Alaric	United Kingdom	The ship driven ashore in the Gut of Canso. She was on a voyage from Charlottetown, Prince Edward Island, Canada to Penarth, Glamorgan. She was later refloated.
Aldaminz	Flag unknown	The ship was wrecked on the Longsand, in the North Sea off the coast of Essex, United Kingdom.
Alice	Canada	The ship was driven ashore at Gibraltar. She was on a voyage from Barcelona, Spain to Matanzas, Cuba. She was later refloated and taken in to Gibraltar in a leaky condition.
Alida	United Kingdom	The ship was lost neat Castillos, Uruguay. She was on a voyage from Buenos Aires, Argentina to an English port.
Alliance	United Kingdom	The ship was driven ashore on the coast of Surinam. She was on a voyage from Surinam to the Clyde. She was refloated.
Alvaraod	Canada	The ship was driven ashore at Cape Cod, Massachusetts, United States.
Ane Kirstine	Denmark	The ship was driven ashore near Amsterdam, North Holland, Netherlands.
Anglo American	United States	The ship was lost at Cabo Corrientes, Cuba. She was on a voyage from Truxillo to New York.
Anna	United States	The ship was wrecked on Rum Cay, Bahamas. She was on a voyage from Sagua La Grande, Cuba to Boston, Massachusetts.
Ann Elizabeth	United Kingdom	The ship was driven ashore on the Swedish coast. She was on a voyage from Memel, Prussia to Liverpool. She was refloated and taken in to Helsingør, Denmark.
Anne Porter	United Kingdom	The ship struck the wreck of the steamship Lismore (United Kingdom) and sank at Woosung, China.
Antje	Prussia	The ship sank at Kolberg. She was on a voyage from Emden to Leer.
Antonia	France	The ship was wrecked on the coast of Patagonia, Argentina.
Argos	Italy	The barque was wrecked on the Longsand. Her crew were rescued by Faith (United Kingdom). Argos was on a voyage from Odesa, Russia to Ipswich, Suffolk, United Kingdom.
Ariel	United Kingdom	The ship was wrecked at North Rustico, Prince Edward Island.
Auguste Duvin	France	The ship was driven ashore and severely damaged at Montevideo, Uruguay. She was on a voyage from Bordeaux, Gironde to Montevideo.
Aurora	Sweden	The brig was driven ashore and wrecked on Læsø, Denmark with the loss of five of her nine crew. She was on a voyage from Hartlepool, County Durham, United Kingdom to Swinemünde, Prussia.
Aygyptoe	Flag unknown	The ship collided with the steamship Blyth (United Kingdom) and sank in the Danube.
Aztics	United Kingdom	The ship struck a rock off Hong Kong and was beached in Kowloon Bay. She was on a voyage from Hong Kong to Shanghai, China.
Belmont	United Kingdom	The ship was wrecked in Cymras Bay. She was on a voyage from New York to Liverpool.
Betty English	United Kingdom	The ship was driven ashore at Truxillo.
Black Boys	United Kingdom	The ship was driven ashore at Ryde, Isle of Wight. She was on a voyage from Swansea, Glamorgan to London. She was refloated.
Blyth Knott	United Kingdom	The ship was abandoned at sea in a waterlogged condition.
Bolivar	United Kingdom	The steamship ran aground at Liverpool. She was on a voyage from Liverpool to the West Indies.
Bombay Packet	United Kingdom	The ship was driven ashore in Saint John's Bay with the loss of all hands. She was on a voyage from Saint John's, Newfoundland Colony to the Bristol Channel.
Canopus	United Kingdom	The barque capsized with the loss of two of her crew. She was on a voyage from Memel to London. Survivors were rescued by a schooner. Canopus was towed in to Danzig on 7 December in a waterlogged condition, with the two corpses on board. She was consequently condemned.
Carrie Puriton	United States	The ship ran aground in the Bahamas. She was on a voyage from Bath, Maine to Havana, Cuba.
Cassandra	United Kingdom	The ship ran aground at St. Anthony's Lighthouse, Cornwall. She was refloated and taken in to Falmouth, Cornwall.
Catawba	United States	The ship was wrecked at Exuma, Bahamas. She was on a voyage from Exuma to New York.
Charlotte	United Kingdom	The ship was driven ashore on Læsø She was on a voyage from Gävle, Sweden to London.
Childers	United Kingdom	The ship was wrecked on the Gunfleet Sand, in the North Sea off the coast of Essex. She was on a voyage from Montrose, Forfarshire to London.
Cincinnati	United States	The ship foundered. She was on a voyage from Callao, Peru to Genoa, Italy.
City of Dublin	United Kingdom	The ship ran aground on the Southwest Spit. She was on a voyage from Liverpool to New York.
Clothilda	United Kingdom	The steamship was driven ashore at Wells, Maine, United States. She was on a voyage from Belfast, County Antrim to Portland, Maine.
Concordia	Sweden	The ship was driven ashore on Öland. She was on a voyage from Amsterdam to Stockholm. She was refloated and taken in to Kalmar.
Crasio	Austria-Hungary	The brig was driven ashore at Marseille, Bouches-du-Rhône, France. Her crew were rescued. She was on a voyage from Marianople, Russia to Marseille.
Darien	United Kingdom	The steamship ran aground at South West Point. She was on a voyage from New Orleans, Louisiana, United States to Liverpool. She was on a voyage from .
Daybreak	United Kingdom	The ship was driven ashore near Vlissingen. She was refloated and resumed her voyage.
Delta	United Kingdom	The ship ran aground in the Dardanelles. She was on a voyage from Taganrog, Russia to Falmouth. She was refloated and resumed her voyage.
Deux Associes	France	The ship was driven ashore at La Trinité-sur-Mer, Morbihan. She was on a voyage from Bilbao, Spain to Briton Ferry, Glamorgan. She was refloated and found to be leaky.
Duncairn	United Kingdom	The ship ran aground in the Rangafulla Channel. She was refloated and resumed her voyage.
Ealing Grove	United Kingdom	The ship ran aground. She was on a voyage from London to Riga, Russia. She was refloated and taken in to Helsingør.
Emanuel	Sweden	The ship was driven ashore at Rønne, Denmark. She was on a voyage from Stockholm to Memel.
Eme	United Kingdom	The ship was driven ashore at Dungeness, Kent. She was on a voyage from Foochow, China to London. She was refloated and taken in to Gravesend, Kent.
Ettina	Prussia	The ship was driven ashore near Nidden. She was on a voyage from "Lee" to Memel.
Euphemia	United Kingdom	The schooner was driven ashore at Truxillo.
European	United Kingdom	The steamship ran aground on the Traverse. She was on a voyage from Quebec City, Canada to Liverpool.
Flower of Arun	United Kingdom	The ship was wrecked at East London, Cape Colony.
Francesca Madre R.	Flag unknown	The ship was wrecked in the Sea of Marmara. She was on a voyage from a Mediterranean port to Constantinople, Ottoman Empire.
Geertruda Jacoba	Netherlands	The ship was driven ashore and wrecked 6 nautical miles (11 km) east of Licata, Sicily, Italy before 9 December. Her crew were rescued. She was on a voyage from Trieste to Messina, Sicily.
Georgiana	United States	The ship ran aground at Mobile, Alabama. She was on a voyage from Rio de Janeiro, Brazil to Mobile.
George Roberts	United Kingdom	The ship ran aground on the Pampus. She was on a voyage from Rotterdam, South Holland, Netherlands to Gloucester. She was refloated and taken in to Rotterdam.
Glory of the Seas	United Kingdom	The ship ran aground in the River Thames at Blackwall, Middlesex. She was on a voyage from San Francisco, California, United States to London.
Governor Morton	United States	The ship was driven ashore on Tybee Island, Georgia before 7 December. She was on a voyage from Phoenix Island to Savannah, Georgia.
Gustav Wasa	Prussia	The ship ran aground on the Viucta Reef, in the Baltic Sea. She was on a voyage from Hartlepool to Swinemünde. She was later refloated and taken in to Swinemünde.
Harriet Agnes	United Kingdom	The ship ran aground at Galaţi, Ottoman Empire.
Hector	United Kingdom	The brig was abandoned in the North Sea before 14 December. She was on a voyage from Gävle, Sweden to Hartlepool.
Hendricka Pybes	Belgium	The ship sank near Riga. She was on a voyage from Riga to a Belgian port.
Heinrich Wupper	Flag unknown	The ship ran aground on the Medem Sand.
Humberstone	United Kingdom	The barque foundered off the coast of Formosa. She was on a voyage from Hong Kong to Foo Chow Foo, China.
Iona	United Kingdom	The ship was lost near Montevideo
Isabella	United Kingdom	The ship ran aground on the Maplin Sand, in the North Sea off the coast of Essex. She was refloated with assistance.
Jacobus	Netherlands	The ship was driven ashore on Bornholm, Denmark and was wrecked. She was on a voyage from Danzig to Amsterdam.
Jerome	United Kingdom	The steamship ran aground off "Chapes Virado". She was refloated.
Joanis	Flag unknown	The ship was wrecked in the Dardanelles.
John E. Chase	United States	The ship was holed by ice at New Castle, Pennsylvania. She was on a voyage from Philadelphia to Antwerp, Belgium.
John Gustav Cordis	Hamburg	The ship was driven ashore and wrecked on Scharhörn, Hamburg. She was on a voyage from Newcastle upon Tyne to Hamburg.
John Todd	United States	The schooner foundered in the Atlantic Ocean with loss of life. Survivors were rescued by the full-rigged ship Euxine (United Kingdom).
Julia	United States	The ship was abandoned at sea. She was on a voyage from Surinam to Boston, Massachusetts.
Junfrau	Hamburg	The ship was driven ashore and abandoned near Cuxhaven. She was on a voyage from Newcastle upon Tyne to Hamburg.
Kago Emile	Flag unknown	The ship was driven ashore at New Romney, Kent. She was on a voyage from Grimsby, Lincolnshire, United Kingdom to Barcelona. She was refloated and taken in to Newhaven, Sussex, United Kingdom.
Kalahome	Siam	The steamship ran aground in the Lycemon Pass. She was refloated and found to be severely leaky. She was beached at Hong Kong before 28 December.
Kebroyd	India	The ship ran aground at the entrance to the Shatt al-Arab. She was on a voyage from Swansea to Bussorah, Persia. She was refloated and put in to Bombay, India.
Land o' Cakes	United Kingdom	The ship was abandoned in the Atlantic Ocean. She was on a voyage from Ardrossan, Ayrshire to Boston, Massachusetts.
Laurents	Russia	The ship was wrecked at Kertch.
Lorina	United Kingdom	The ship struck rocks at "Cochinos", Spain. She was on a voyage from Cardiff, Glamorgan to Cádiz, Spain. She was refloated and taken in to the Bay of Cádiz.
Louis Marie	France	The ship was driven ashore at Carmen, Uruguay. She was on a voyage from Carmen to Marseille.
Manning	United Kingdom	The ship was wrecked on the Hat Key Reef. She was on a voyage from Puerto Cabello, Venezuela to Belize City, British Honduras.
Martha Bowker	United States	The ship ran aground at "Schuylkill". She was on a voyage from Philadelphia to Bremen.
Martinus Henriette	Netherlands	The steamship ran aground on Schulmansplaat. She was on a voyage from London to Hellevoetsluis, Zeeland. She was refloated and taken in to Hellevoetsluis.
Mary	United Kingdom	The ship struck the pier at Dover, Kent and sprang a leak. She was on a voyage from Runcorn, Cheshire to Ghent, East Flanders, Belgium.
Mary Fenwick	United Kingdom	The ship was driven ashore and wrecked near Low Hauxley, Northumberland.
Mary Maria	Canada	The ship was wrecked at Harrisburg, Nova Scotia with the loss of all hands. She was on a voyage from Sydney, Nova Scotia to Boston, Massachusetts.
Mercedita	United States	The ship was driven ashore on Folly Island, South Carolina. She was on a voyage from New York to Charleston, South Carolina.
Mercia	United Kingdom	The ship was driven ashore in the Dardanelles. She was on a voyage from Berdianski, Russia to Falmouth. She was refloated.
Milano	Italy	The brig was wrecked at Cape Spartivento, Sardinia. Her crew were rescued. She was on a voyage from Leith, Lothian, United Kingdom to Venice.
Mill Driver	United States	The ship was driven ashore at Cape Henlopen, Delaware.
Millicete	United Kingdom	The ship was driven ashore on Heligoland. She was refloated.
Milos	Flag unknown	The ship was driven ashore in the Dardanelles near Cape Sestos, Ottoman Empire. She was on a voyage from Odesa, Russia to Falmouth. She was refloated and resumed her voyage.
Mina	Norway	The schooner was abandoned in a waterlogged condition. She was on a voyage from Dram to Papenburg, Prussia.
Minerva	United Kingdom	The ship was driven ashore 6 nautical miles (11 km) east of Licata. Her crew were rescued.
Morning Star	United Kingdom	The ship was abandoned. She was on a voyage from Copenhagen, Denmark to Boston. She was subsequently discovered by a British government steamship.
Nestor	United Kingdom	The ship was driven ashore by ice downstream of Cuxhaven.
Neva	Norway	The schooner was driven ashore at the entrance to the Caledonian Canal. She was on a voyage from Riga to Belfast. She was refloated and towed in to Belfast in a leaky condition by the steamship Flying Sylph (United Kingdom.
Ocean Wave	Canada	The ship was abandoned in the Atlantic Ocean. She was on a voyage from New Orleans to Liverpool. She was taken in to Nassau, Bahamas in a derelict condition on 18 December. She was repaired and resumed her voyage, but subsequently foundered.
Ottawa	United Kingdom	The steamship was driven ashore at Thomas Point. She was on a voyage from Liverpool to Baltimore, Maryland, United States. She was later refloated.
Ottille	Danzig	The ship was driven ashore at Rønne, Denmark. She was on a voyage from Grimsby to Danzig.
Pensee	France	The ship was driven ashore at Mardyk, Nord. She was on a voyage from Oran, Algeria to Dunkirk, Nord.
Phare	United Kingdom	The ship was driven ashore at Happisburgh, Norfolk. She was refloated and taken in to Lowestoft, Suffolk in a severely leaky condition .
Professor Matheson	Flag unknown	The barque was wrecked on reefs off Cape São Rocque, Brazil before 8 December. She was on a voyage from Boston, Massachusetts to Rangoon, Burma.
Reburn Rose	(Canada)	The ship was wrecked at Cape Forchu, Nova Scotia. She was on a voyage from Yarmouth, Nova Scotia to Saint John, New Brunswick.
Rossway	United Kingdom	The ship was lost at Lagos, Africa. She was on a voyage from Africa to Liverpool.
Royal Arthur	United Kingdom	The ship caught fire at San Francisco.
Samson	Prussia	The ship was beached in the Elbe downstream of Twielenfleth.
San Francisco	United States	The ship was beached on Bermuda. She was on a voyage from New York to Bermuda.
Sarah Louisa	United States	The ship was wrecked in the Bahamas. She was on a voyage from Havana to Boston, Massachusetts.
Saxon	United Kingdom	The steamship struck a sunken rock off Struys Point, Cape Colony and was damaged. She was placed under repair.
Seaton	United Kingdom	The ship was driven ashore. She was on a voyage from South Shields to Southampton, Hampshire.
Sharon	United States	The ship collided with another vessel and was abandoned. She was on a voyage from New York to Constantinople.
Silver Oar	United Kingdom	The ship was driven ashore on Terschelling, Friesland, Netherlands. She was on a voyage from Riga to London.
Souvenir	France	The ship was driven ashore at Sisal, Mexico. She was refloated and resumed her voyage.
Spark	United Kingdom	The ship was wrecked on the coast of the Newfoundland Colony. She was on a voyage from Montreal, Canada to Penarth.
St. Louis	United States	The ship ran aground on the Memory Rock. She was on a voyage from New Orleans to an English port.[4]
St. Philomene	France	The ship was driven ashore on the coast of Calvados. She was on a voyage from the Mellacorée River to Caen, Calvados.
Stromness	United States	The ship was driven ashore on Lovells Island, Massachusetts. She was on a voyage from Port-au-Prince, Haiti to Boston, Massachusetts.
Suomets	Russia	The ship was wrecked at Kertch.
Syren	United Kingdom	The ship was driven ashore in Gratness Bay. She was on a voyage from Liverpool to Fair Isle.
Thisnelde	Bremen	The ship was driven ashore on "Landwoog". She was on a voyage from Philadelphia to Bremen.
Trovatore	United States	The barque capsized off Cape Spartivento with the loss of six of the ten people on board. Survivors were rescued by an Italian brig. She was on a voyage from Palermo, Sicily to Trieste.
Twinkling Star	Flag unknown	The steamship was driven ashore at Savanna-la-Mar, Jamaica before 9 December. She was on a voyage from Kingston, Jamaica to New Orleans. She was consequently condemned.
Two Brodre	Denmark	The ship ran aground on the Hundelbakje and was wrecked. She was on a voyage from Brake, Prussia to Copenhagen.
Ukko	(Russian Empire) Grand Duchy of Finland	The ship was taken in to Rønne, Denmark in a waterlogged condition. She was on a voyage from Lübeck to Pori.
Ulpiano	Spain	The barque was wrecked on Süderoog, Prussia. Her crew were rescued. She was on a voyage from Spain to Hamburg.
Valentia	Greece	The brig was wrecked at Scilla, Italy. She was on a voyage from Taganrog to Marseille.
Veteran	United States	The ship was driven ashore at Edgartown, Massachusetts. She was on a voyage from Kronstadt, Russia to New York. She was refloated.
Victor	United Kingdom	The brig was abandoned in the North Sea before 21 December.
Victoria	United Kingdom	The ship ran aground on the Skallo Reef. She was on a voyage from Sundsvall to Kiel, Prussia.
Victoria	United Kingdom	The ship was driven ashore and sank at Clockhouse Point. She was on a voyage from Bangor to Poole, Dorset.
Virginia	United States	The ship sprang a leak and was abandoned at sea. She was on a voyage from Puerto Plata, Dominican Republic to New York.
Watchful	United Kingdom	The ship was lost whilst on a voyage from Huelva, Spain to London.
Wenogen	United Kingdom	The ship was driven ashore at Dragør, Denmark. She was on a voyage from Danzig to Dublin. She was refloated and taken in to Copenhagen.
