= Catterline =

Village in Aberdeenshire, Scotland

Coordinates: 56°53′52″N 2°13′04″W

- Village
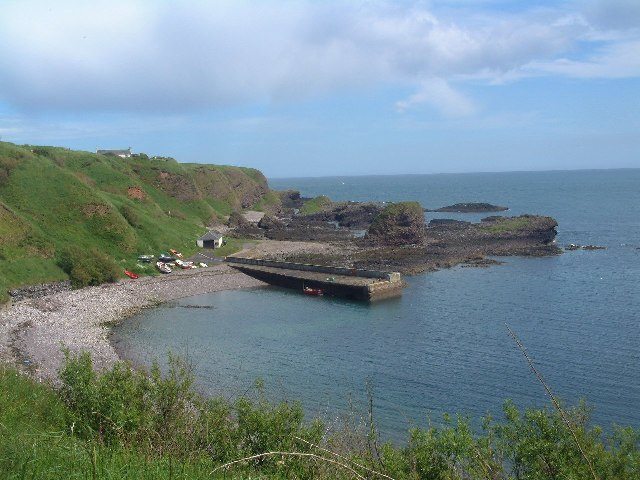
- Catterline Harbour, the village was a fishing centre in the 19th century

- Location within Aberdeenshire
- OS grid reference: NO 869 783
- Council area: Aberdeenshire
- Lieutenancy area: Kincardineshire
- Country: Scotland
- Sovereign state: United Kingdom
- Post town: STONEHAVEN
- Postcode district: AB39
- Police: Scotland
- Fire: Scottish
- Ambulance: Scottish
- UK Parliament: West Aberdeenshire and Kincardine
- Scottish Parliament: Angus North and Mearns

Catterline is a coastal village on the North Sea in Aberdeenshire, Scotland. It is situated about 5 miles (8.0 km) south of Stonehaven; nearby to the north are Dunnottar Castle and Fowlsheugh Nature Reserve. Other noted architectural or historic features in the general area include Fetteresso Castle, Fiddes Castle, Chapel of St. Mary and St. Nathalan and Muchalls Castle.

Todhead Lighthouse is situated just to the south of Catterline.

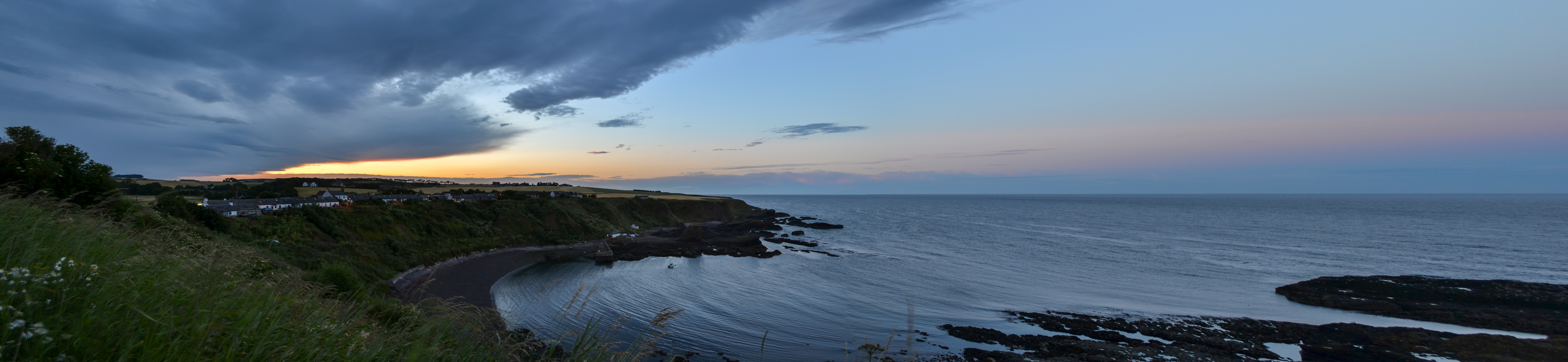
View of Catterline Bay

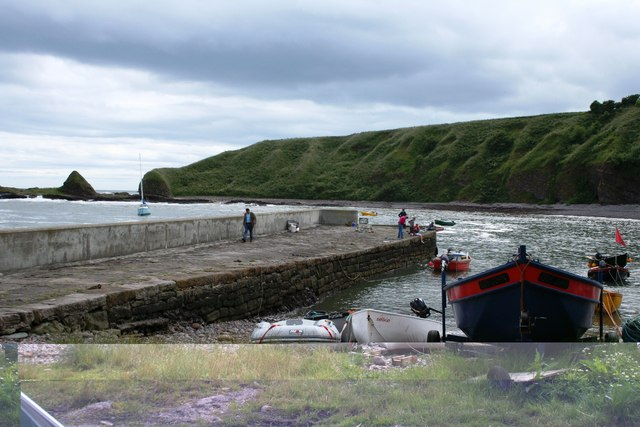
Catterline Pier

== Vicinity prehistory ==
Prehistoric features in the local area include Bronze Age archaeological recoveries at Fetteresso, Dunnottar and Spurryhillock.

== Notable inhabitants ==
The artist Joan Eardley lived in the village in the 1950s up until her death in 1963. Many of her wild seascapes were painted here. The painter James Morrison also lived and worked in Catterline in the late 1950s, before moving to Montrose.

Scottish-Canadian communist politician Tom McEwen was a resident of Catterline between 1900 and 1904.

== Local media ==
Alongside the commercial enterprise of the local newspaper, the Mearns Leader, Catterline also receives broadcasts from local community radio station Mearns FM.

== Facilities ==
Catterline has a primary school. With the mothballing of the nearby Kinneff Primary School at the end of the 2024-2025 academic term, children from Kinneff now usually attend Catterline primary.

Catterline Community Church, which used to meet in the primary school, now meets in the former St Philip's Episcopal Church building on the outskirts of the community.

In addition, Catterline has a restaurant (the Creel Inn).

== See also ==
- Crawton
- Catterline Cartie Challenge
