= List of listed buildings in Kinneff and Catterline, Aberdeenshire =

This is a list of listed buildings in the parish of Kinneff and Catterline in Aberdeenshire, Scotland.

== List ==
Name	Location	Date Listed	Grid Ref. (Note: Sometimes known as OSGB36, the grid reference (where provided) is based on the British national grid reference system used by the Ordnance Survey. • "Guide to National Grid". Ordnance Survey. • "Get-a-map". Ordnance Survey.)	Geo-coordinates	Notes	LB Number (Note: Historic Environment Scotland assign a unique alphanumeric identifier to each designated site in Scotland, for listed buildings this always begins with "LB", for example "LB12345".)	Image
1-10 South Row, Catterline				56°53′38″N 2°13′04″W	Category B	9511	Upload Photo
Kineff Old Parish Kirk				56°51′55″N 2°14′20″W	Category B	9531	Upload Photo
Kineff Old Parish Kirk Manse				56°51′54″N 2°14′20″W	Category B	9532	Upload Photo
Castle Of Fiddes				56°55′21″N 2°17′25″W	Category A	6753	Upload Photo
Catterline Bridge Over Catterline Burn				56°53′52″N 2°13′04″W	Category C(S)	9513	Upload Photo
Rob Roy Inn, Roadside				56°52′59″N 2°15′17″W	Category C(S)	9534	Upload Photo
Todhead Lighthouse				56°53′02″N 2°12′55″W	Category B	9535	Upload Photo
Fawsyde House, Folly				56°53′07″N 2°15′18″W	Category B	48021	Upload Photo
Bellfield Farmhouse				56°53′30″N 2°14′06″W	Category C(S)	9510	Upload Photo
Fawsyde House, Including Garden Wall				56°53′05″N 2°15′19″W	Category C(S)	48020	Upload Photo
St Philip's Episcopal Church Catterline				56°54′03″N 2°13′01″W	Category C(S)	9514	Upload Photo
Kinneff And Catterline Parish Kirk				56°52′42″N 2°15′27″W	Category C(S)	9533	Upload Photo
Catterline Old Burial Ground				56°53′51″N 2°13′07″W	Category C(S)	9512	Upload Photo

== Key ==
The scheme for classifying buildings in Scotland is:

- Category A: "buildings of national or international importance, either architectural or historic; or fine, little-altered examples of some particular period, style or building type."
- Category B: "buildings of regional or more than local importance; or major examples of some particular period, style or building type, which may have been altered."
- Category C: "buildings of local importance; lesser examples of any period, style, or building type, as originally constructed or moderately altered; and simple traditional buildings which group well with other listed buildings."

In March 2016 there were 47,288 listed buildings in Scotland. Of these, 8% were Category A, and 50% were Category B, with the remaining 42% being Category C.

== See also ==
- List of listed buildings in Aberdeenshire
