= Crawton =

Coordinates: 56°54′34″N 2°12′01″W

Crawton is a former fishing community on the southeast Aberdeenshire coast in Scotland, deserted since 1927.

Approximately three miles (5 km) south of Stonehaven, Crawton Farm (grid reference NO879798) lies to the north of Catterline above a shingle beach. The ruins of 23 houses and a school are all that survive of the coastal hamlet on the clifftop. In its heyday, 30 Crawton men fished 12 boats and the village had its own fish merchant. Following nearly 50 years of decline due to overfishing, Crawton was finally deserted by its last inhabitant in 1927.

Crawton is adjacent to the nature reserve of Fowlsheugh, which is a Site of Special Scientific Interest in the United Kingdom.

Noted architectural or historic features in the general area include Dunnottar Castle, Fiddes Castle, Fetteresso Castle, Chapel of St. Mary and St. Nathalan and Muchalls Castle.

Crawton is known for its geological diversity and is a popular site for both university and school field trips. It is a tradition to perform a mini-bus quiz on the journey to Crawton, started by the geologist Ian Rae.

== Vicinity prehistory ==
Prehistorical features in the vicinity include Bronze Age archaeological recoveries at Fetteresso, Dunnottar and Spurryhillock.

== See also ==
- Catterline
- Craiglethy
