= Craiglethy =

Island in Aberdeenshire, Scotland

Coordinates: 56°55′22″N 2°11′48″W

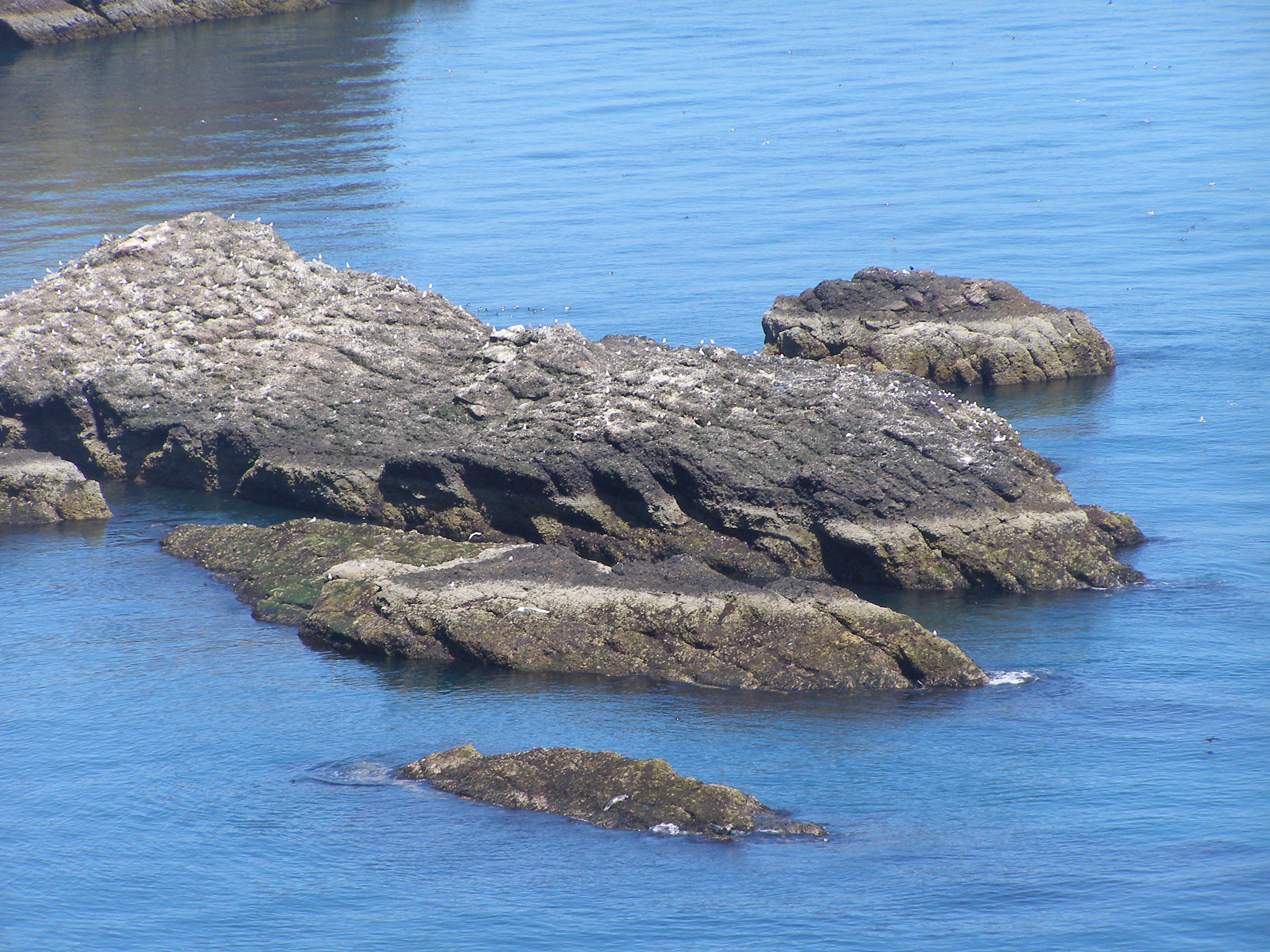
Skerry of Craiglethy

Craiglethy (Scottish Gaelic: Creag Liathach - meaning grey rock) is a small island/skerry off Fowlsheugh on the east coast of Aberdeenshire, Scotland in the North Sea. As it is part of Fowlsheugh, it is an SSSI, with many seabirds and seals living on it. It is also one of the few islands on the east coast of Scotland, along with Mugdrum Island and Inchcape, apart from the Islands of the Forth.

== Area history ==
There are numerous prehistoric and historic features in the general vicinity of Craiglethy. Somewhat to the north are Bronze Age archaeological sites at Fetteresso and Spurryhillock. Notable historical features include Dunnottar Castle, Stonehaven Tolbooth and Muchalls Castle, Fiddes Castle and Spurryhillock.

== See also ==
- Crawton
