= James Morrison (artist) =

Scottish painter (1932–2020)

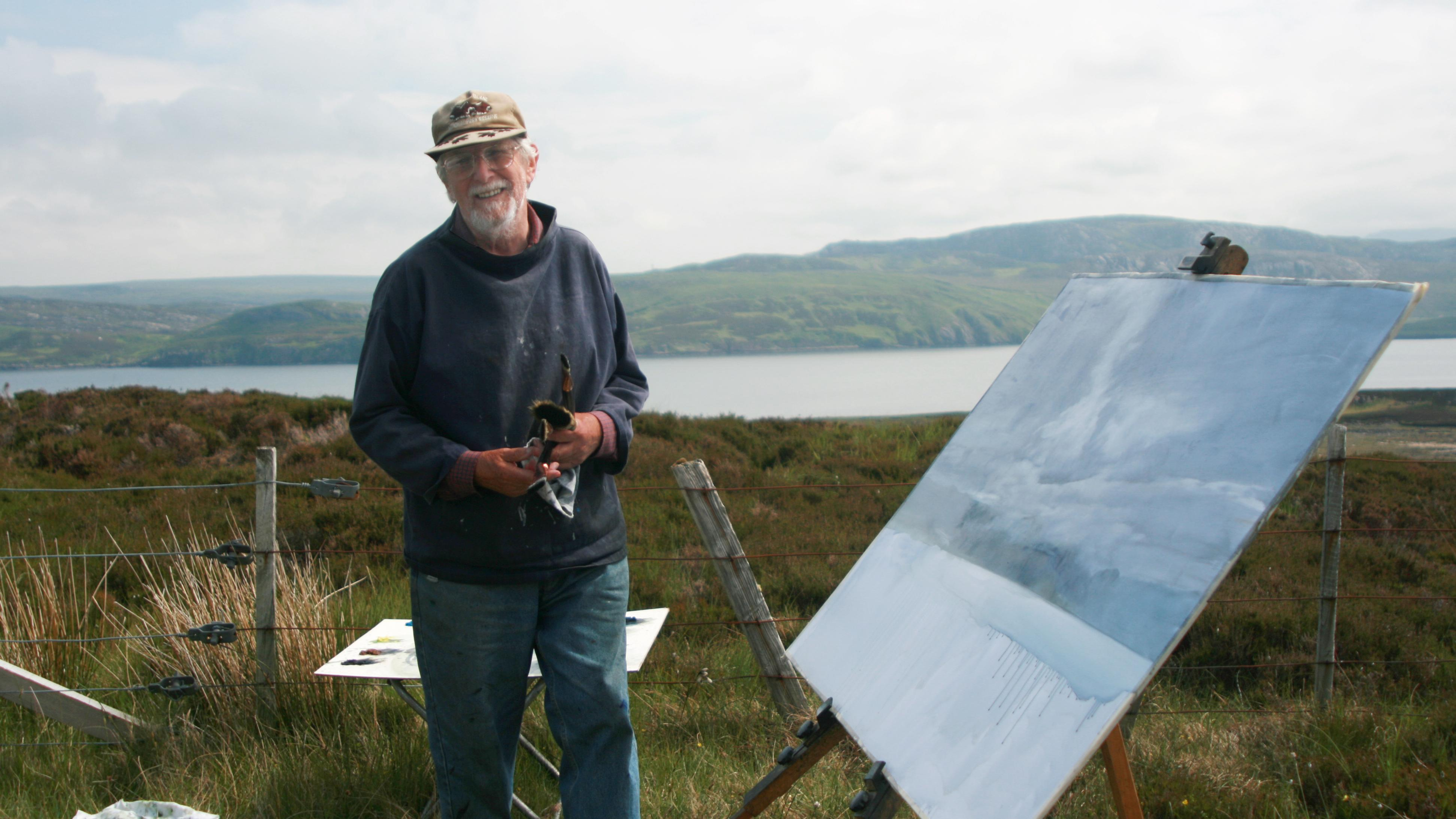
- Born: James Fyffe Thomson Morrison; 11 April 1932; Glasgow, Scotland
- Died: 31 August 2020 (aged 88); Montrose, Scotland

James Fyffe Thomson Morrison, RSA, RSW (11 April 1932 – 31 August 2020) was a Scottish landscape painter. Born in Glasgow, James "Jim" Morrison studied at the Glasgow School of Art from 1950 to 1954. In 1957, along with Anda Paterson and James Spence, he founded the Glasgow Group of artists.

Morrison was an Academician of the Royal Scottish Academy and a member of the Royal Scottish Society of Painters in Watercolour.

In 1965 Morrison joined the staff at Duncan of Jordanstone College of Art & Design in Dundee and settled in Montrose. He left the college in 1987 to paint full-time.

Whilst in Glasgow he painted several striking canvases of Glasgow tenements. His main working areas were the farmland around his home in Angus and the rugged landscape of Assynt in Sutherland. He also undertook a number of painting expeditions outside Scotland to southern France, to the Arctic Circle, and the Limpopo region of Botswana.

The royal family own several Morrison paintings, as does J. K. Rowling.

The hour-long documentary film, Eye of the Storm, directed Anthony W. J. Baxter (director of You've Been Trumped), was premiered at the 2021 Glasgow Film Festival. The film examines Morrison's documentation of the impact climate change has on the Arctic, to where he travelled many times, and recounts his deep personal interest in the changing landscapes of his native Scotland, in the context of his progressive sight loss. On 4 April 2021 the film was broadcast by BBC Two.
