= HMS Psyche (1862) =

History

United Kingdom
- Name: HMS Psyche
- Ordered: 1861
- Builder: Pembroke Dockyard; Engines by John Penn and Sons
- Laid down: 8 January 1861
- Launched: 29 March 1862
- Commissioned: 1862
- Fate: Wrecked on 15 December 1870; Wreck blown up in February 1871

General characteristics
- Class & type: Psyche-class paddle despatch vessel
- Displacement: 985 long tons (1,001 t)
- Tons burthen: 835 bm
- Length: 220 ft (67 m)
- Beam: 28 ft 2 in (8.59 m)
- Depth of hold: 14 ft 6 in (4.42 m)
- Installed power: 1,440 ihp (1,070 kW)
- Propulsion: 2-cylinder oscillating steam engine
- Armament: 2 × 20 pdr (9.1 kg) guns

HMS Psyche was a wooden Psyche-class paddle despatch vessel built to an 1860 design by Isaac Watts. She was ordered from Pembroke Dockyard in and launched on 29 March 1862, having cost c. £43,000 to build.

She was at Suez for the opening ceremonies of the canal in 1869.

She was wrecked on 15 December 1870 off Catania, Italy, while carrying a party including George Howard Darwin to observe the solar eclipse from Sicily. Her wreck was blown up in February 1871.
