= Todhead Lighthouse =

- Location: Kinneff, Aberdeenshire, Scotland
- Constructed: 1897
- Construction: Harling
- Automated: 1986
- Shape: Circular tower
- Operator: Northern Lighthouse Board
- Heritage: Category B listed

Todhead Lighthouse is a lighthouse in Aberdeenshire, Scotland. The lighthouse is Category B listed.

The lighthouse is located south of Stonehaven on the coastline between Kinneff and Catterline. Todhead is said to take its name from the Scots word for a fox (tod).

== History ==
The lighthouse was completed in 1897 to the design and control of the engineer David Alan Stevenson.

The lighthouse was electrified in 1978 and automated in 1986.

The lighthouse remained under the control of the Northern Lighthouse Board until 2007 when the lighthouse was discontinued and the adjacent buildings sold in a public sale. The optic system, including the machine with the clockwork mechanism and lens were donated to the National Museum of Scotland. The mechanism and lens now form part of the permanent collection. The lantern and lens is 6-metres (20 ft) in height.

In 2013, plans were submitted by Moxton Architects for the restoration, extension and conversion of the lighthouse and works were completed in 2018 winning best design in the Aberdeenshire Architectural and Landscape Design Awards.

== Building and light characteristics ==
The lighthouse is composed of a short circular-section tower with a triangular-paned domed-top standard lantern. The buildings are decorated in Harling with exposed dressings.
