= Cowie (surname) =

Cowie is a surname. Some notable people with the surname include:

- Alex Cowie (born 1947), British squash and tennis player
- Alexander Cowie (1889–1916), English cricketer, soldier, and poet
- Catherine Cowie, American epidemiologist
- Chris Cowie, Scottish DJ and producer
- Colin Cowie, American lifestyle guru
- Don Cowie (footballer), football player
- Don Cowie (sailor) (born 1962), New Zealand sailor
- Doug Cowie (footballer) (1926–2021), Scottish footballer
- Doug Cowie (umpire), New Zealand cricket umpire
- Edward Cowie, English composer
- George Cowie, Scottish football player
- George Cowie (Wisconsin), American politician
- Helen Cowie (historian), British historian
- Helen Cowie (bullying expert), British academic
- Helen Cowie (doctor) (1875–1956), New Zealand doctor
- Ian Donald Cowie (born 1956) Australian botanist
- Indi Cowie (born 1994), US association football player
- Jack Cowie, New Zealand cricketer
- James Cowie (Australian settler), Australian politician
- James Cowie (artist), Scottish painter
- Jimmy Cowie, Scottish footballer
- Lennox Cowie, Scottish astronomer
- Lorn Cowie, Lord Cowie (1926–2026), Scottish rugby union player and judge
- Mervyn Cowie, conservationist in Kenya
- Nigel Cowie, British banker
- Patience Cowie, British geologist
- Peter Cowie, English film historian
- Richard Kylea Cowie, British musician better known as Wiley (rapper)
- Rob Cowie, Canadian ice hockey player
- Robert Cowie, British physician and author
- Thomas Jefferson Cowie, US Navy rear admiral
- Tom Cowie, English businessman

== See also ==
- Cowie (disambiguation)
- Cowie Castle
- Bowie
- Dowie
