= Cowie =

Cowie may refer to:

== People ==
- Cowie (surname)

== Places ==
- Cowie, Aberdeenshire, an historic fishing village located at the north side of Stonehaven, Scotland
  - Cowie Castle, a ruined castle in Aberdeenshire, Scotland
  - Chapel of St. Mary and St. Nathalan (called Cowie Chapel), a ruined chapel in Aberdeenshire, Scotland
  - Cowie Water, a river discharging to the North Sea at Stonehaven, Scotland
    - Cowie Bridge, a roadway crossing of the Cowie Water in Stonehaven, Scotland
- Cowie, Stirling, a small ex-mining village located on the outskirts of the city of Stirling, in Central Scotland
- Cowie, the former name of Corio, Victoria, Australia

== Other uses ==
- USS Cowie (DD-632), a destroyer
- Cowie Group, a British bus and coach operator now called Arriva
