= Helen Cowie =

Helen Cowie may refer to:

- Helen Cowie (bullying expert), emeritus professor at the University of Surrey
- Helen Cowie (historian), professor at the University of York
- Helen Cowie (doctor), New Zealand doctor
