= Donna Y. Ford =

American educator

- Born: 1961 (age 64–65)
- Occupations: Educator, anti-racist and culturally responsive advocate, consultant, author, and academic
- Awards: Early Scholar Award, National Association for Gifted Children, Senior Scholar in Gifted Education Award, The American Educational Research Association, Distinguished Scholar Award, National Association for Gifted Children, Legacy Award, National Association for Gifted Children,

Academic background
- Education: BA in Communication and Spanish; MEd in Counseling; PhD in Individual Differences(Educational Psychology with focus on gifted and talented Black students)
- Alma mater: Cleveland State University
- Thesis: [ProQuest 304048621 Self-Perceptions of Social, Psychological, and Cultural Determinants of Achievement among Gifted Black Students: A Paradox of Underachievement] (1991)
- Website: https://www.drdonnayford.com/

Donna Y. Ford is an American educator, anti-racist, advocate, author and academic. She is a distinguished professor of education and human ecology and a faculty affiliate with the center for Latin American studies in the college of arts and sciences, and the Kirwan Institute in the college of education and human ecology at Ohio State University.

Ford's research interests span the fields of gifted education and multicultural/urban education with a focus on comprehending the achievement gap, recruiting and retaining culturally different students in advanced courses, multicultural curriculum and instruction, culturally competent teacher training and development, African-American Identity, and African-American family involvement. She has almost 350 publications including journal papers and book chapters. She is also the author, co-author and co-editor of 14 books including Diverse Learners with Exceptionalities: Culturally Responsive Teaching in the Inclusive Classroom, Recruiting and Retaining Culturally Different Students in Gifted Education, and Gumbo for the Soul: Liberating Memoirs and Stories to Inspire Females of Color.

Ford is a Senior Editor for Taboo: Journal of Culture and Education, a Section Editor for the Journal of Negro Education, and an Associate Editor for Education and Urban Society. She is a member of the National Association for Gifted Children, the Council for Exceptional Children (CEC), and the American Psychological Association.

== Education ==
Ford obtained her Bachelor of Arts degree in communication and Spanish in 1984, followed by a master's degree in counseling in 1988, and a PhD in educational psychology in 1991, all from Cleveland State University. Her PhD thesis was titled Self-Perceptions of Social, Psychological, and Cultural Determinants of Achievement among Gifted Black Students: A Paradox of Underachievement.

== Career ==
Following her master's degree, Ford began her academic career as an instructor in the department of educational specialists at Cleveland State University. Subsequently, after receiving her PhD in 1991, she was appointed as an assistant professor in the college of human environmental sciences at the University of Kentucky and promoted to associate professor of the educational psychology program in the School of Education and Human Development (then the Curry School of Education) at the University of Virginia, in 1996. She later joined Ohio State University as an associate professor and then became a professor of special education there in 2002. She then moved to Vanderbilt University in 2004, where she was appointed the Harvie Branscomb Distinguished Professor. She returned to Ohio State University in 2019, where she holds the position of distinguished professor of education and human ecology and two faculty affiliates: center for Latin American studies in the college of arts and sciences and the Kirwan Institute in the college of education and human ecology at Ohio State University.

Ford is the co-chair of the educational studies mentoring committee in the college of education and human ecology at Ohio State University.

Ford is the co-founder of Scholar Identity Institute (SII) for Black Males, and creator of The Ford Female Achievement Model of Excellence (F2AME). She has been the board member of National Association for Gifted Children and is the former co-chair of DDEL Committee at the Council for Exceptional Children.

== Research ==
Ford's research focuses on gifted and talented education, multicultural and anti-racist education, and urban education. She has authored/co-authored over 300 articles She is an advocate for multicultural education, arguing that it is essential for all students, particularly those from marginalized and minoritized backgrounds, to see themselves reflected in the curriculum. She is also known for developing and implementing several culturally responsive teaching strategies and curricula for teachers and administrators.

Ford's research contributions have helped to ensure that all students, regardless of their racial ethnic, and economic background, have access to high-quality and culturally responsive education.

=== Achievement gap ===
Ford has a specific research focus on understanding the achievement gap and related issues among gifted students from diverse cultural backgrounds and has proposed various strategies to address this gap. In her research on the underachievement of African American males in urban schools, she emphasizes the importance of adopting a social justice and civil rights approach among urban educators to reverse the trend of underachievement. In her book Reversing Underachievement Among Gifted Black Students: Promising Practices and Programs explores various actions that can be taken to eliminate underachievement among Black students. Geoffrey D. Borman commended this book for its practical approach towards the education sector and added, "is one of the few sources of practical information about what schools and other can do to advance the representation of minorities among the nation’s most gifted and successful students." One of her substantial work in this area includes the presentation of the Elgin court case where she discussed the necessity of taking appropriate measures to address the needs of gifted students, particularly those belonging to minority groups who are significantly underrepresented in educational programs.

Ford also developed the equity formula that can be used to set goals for increasing access to gifted education without using quotas. The formula takes into account the percentage of Black and Hispanic students in a district and sets minimum enrollment goals for these groups based on an allowance of 20%.

=== Multicultural curriculum and instructions ===
Ford has added significant efforts towards highlighting the need, importance, and implementation In 1999, she proposed a framework for infusing multicultural curriculum into gifted education and in a relevant study, she contended that gifted students lack infusion of diversity issues in their curriculum and this is a setback for them. In her book Multicultural Gifted Education she has proposed several ways to enhance and infuse multicultural curriculum and has suggested methods for “best practice” for a classroom teacher. Janeula M. Burt reviewed her book and called it a "comprehensive blend of commentary on multicultural, gifted, and minority student education" and also recommended it to a wide audience by saying "it provides classroom teachers, gifted education teachers, administrators, policymakers, school districts and school board members with the tools for establishing, enhancing, or incorporating an authentic multicultural gifted education curriculum." In the second edition of the book, she has addressed various topics including culturally responsive curriculum and assessment, historical and legal perspectives on educating gifted and minority students, and counseling students from a multicultural perspective. Moreover, the book aims to eliminate the gap between educating advanced learners and educating learners from diverse cultures.

In addition to her research pursuits, Ford has worked on developing and providing training for teachers to improve their cultural competence. Her publication Teaching Culturally Diverse Gifted Students offers a comprehensive guide to effective teaching techniques and essential attributes that promote diversity among students, as well as a framework for constructing a diverse and accomplished gifted program.

Ford developed the Bloom Blank Matrix. Initially created in collaboration with Harris in 1999 and later updated by her in 2011, the Matrix was designed to assist educators in reviewing, critiquing, and modifying their lesson plans, as well as creating original lessons that affect students culturally and cognitively. In her book, Bloom-Banks Matrix: Design Rigorous, Multicultural Curriculum for the Diverse 21st Century Classroom, co-authored with Michelle Trotman Scott, she further explored the application and benefits of the Bloom-Banks matrix in accommodating diverse learning needs and preferences of students in the class.

== Awards and honors ==
- 1994 – Early Scholar Award, National Association for Gifted Children
- 1996 – Scholar of Color Early Career Contribution Award, American Educational Research Association
- 1997 – Book Award Semifinalist, American Educational Research Association
- 2002 – The Distinguished Educator Award, Central Cities Gifted Children's Association
- 2005 – Scholar of Color Distinguished Career Contribution Award, American Educational Research Association
- 2007 – Senior Scholar in Gifted Education Award, American Educational Research Association
- 2008 – Distinguished Scholar Award, National Association for Gifted Children
- 2011 – Outstanding Service Award, Council for Exceptional Children and The Association for the Gifted (CEC-TAG)
- 2016 – I am L.E.E. Academic Research Award (Living Education Everyday), Forest of the Rain Productions
- 2017 – Legacy Award, National Association for Gifted Children
- 2017 – W.E.B. Dubois Higher Education Award, National Alliance for Black School Educators
- 2019 – Warrior Award, The International Colloquium on Black Males in Education
- 2022 – I am L.E.E. Academic Research Award (Living Education Everyday), Forest of the Rain Productions
- 2022 – Palmiar Award
- 2023 – Top 200 Public Influence Rankings, EdWeek RHSU Edu-Scholar
- 2023 – Top 2% of researchers, Stanford University Study
- 2023 - Palmarium Award, Office of the Daniel L. Ritchie Endowed Chair in Gifted Education, University of Denver.

=== Selected books ===
- Cartledge, Gwendolyn; Gardner, Ralph; Ford, Donna Y. (2009). Diverse Learners with Exceptionalities: Culturally Responsive Teaching in the Inclusive Classroom. Pearson. ISBN 978-0-13-114995-3.
- Ford, Donna Y. (2011). "Desegregating Gifted Education: A Need Unmet". In Grantham, Tarek C. (ed.). Gifted and Advanced Black Students in School: An Anthology of Critical Works. Prufrock Press. ISBN 978-1-59363-700-2.
- Ford, Donna Y. (2013). Recruiting and Retaining Culturally Different Students in Gifted Education. Prufrock Press. ISBN 978-1-61821-049-4.
- Ford, Donna Y. (2017). Telling Our Stories: Culturally Different Adults Reflect on Growing Up in Single-parent Families. Information Age Publishing Incorporated. ISBN 978-1-68123-837-1.
- Ford, Donna Y.; Davis, Joy Lawson; Scott, Michelle Trotman (2016). Gumbo for the Soul: Liberating Memoirs and Stories to Inspire Females of Color. Information Age Publishing, Incorporated. ISBN 978-1-68123-697-1.
- Ford, Donna Y. (2011). Reversing Underachievement Among Gifted Black Students. Prufrock Press. ISBN 978-1-59363-487-2.

=== Selected articles ===
- Ford, Donna Y. (1996). "Review of Unraveling the 'Model Minority' Stereotype: Listening to Asian American Youth". The Journal of Negro Education. 65 (2): 248–250. doi:10.2307/2967321. JSTOR 2967321.
- Ford, Donna Y.; Harris, J. John; Tyson, Cynthia A.; Trotman, Michelle Frazier (December 2001). "Beyond deficit thinking: Providing access for gifted African American students". Roeper Review. 24 (2): 52–58. doi:10.1080/02783190209554129. S2CID 143757623.
- Joseph, Laurice M.; Ford, Donna Y. (2006). "Nondiscriminatory Assessment: Considerations for Gifted Education". Gifted Child Quarterly. 50 (1): 42–51. doi:10.1177/001698620605000105. S2CID 143084659.
- Ford, Donna Y.; Whiting, Gilman W. (January 2011). "Beyond Testing: Social and Psychological Considerations in Recruiting and Retaining Gifted Black Students". Journal for the Education of the Gifted. 34 (1): 131–155. doi:10.1177/016235321003400106. S2CID 145465587. ERIC EJ902213.
- Wright, Brian L.; Ford, Donna Y.; Young, Jemimah L. (February 2017). "Ignorance or Indifference? Seeking Excellence and Equity for Under-Represented Students of Color in Gifted Education". Global Education Review. 4 (1): 45–62. ERIC EJ1137997 Gale A544247889.
- Ford, Donna Y.; Grantham, Tarek C.; Harris, J. John (December 1996). "Multicultural gifted education: A wakeup call to the profession". Roeper Review. 19 (2): 72–78. doi:10.1080/02783199609553794.
- Ford, Donna Y.; Davis, Joy Lawson; Dickson, Kenneth T.; Scott, Michelle Frazier Trotman; Grantham, Tarek C.; Moore III, James L.; Taradash, Gloria D. (25 August 2020). "Evaluating Gifted Education Programs Using an Equity-Based and Culturally Responsive Checklist to Recruit and Retain Under-Represented Students of Color". Journal of Minority Achievement, Creativity, and Leadership. 1 (1): 119–146. doi:10.5325/minoachicrealead.1.1.0119. S2CID 226704838.
- Ford, Donna Y.; Collins, Kristina Henry; Grantham, Tarek C.; Moore, James L. (2021). "Equity-Based Gifted and Talented Education to Increase the Recruitment and Retention of Black and Other Underrepresented Students". Conceptions of Giftedness and Talent. pp. 141–161. doi:10.1007/978-3-030-56869-6_9. ISBN 978-3-030-56868-9. S2CID 232321545.
- Ford, Donna Y. (2021). "Intelligence Testing and Cultural Diversity: The Need for Alternative Instruments, Policies, and Procedures". Alternative Assessments. pp. 107–128. doi:10.4324/9781003232988-6. ISBN 978-1-00-323298-8. S2CID 240589255.
- Hines, Erik M.; Ford, Donna Y.; Fletcher, Edward C.; Moore, James L. (3 July 2022). "All eyez on me: Disproportionality, disciplined, and disregarded while Black". Theory into Practice. 61 (3): 288–299. doi:10.1080/00405841.2022.2096376. S2CID 250400094.
- Fletcher, Edward C.; Hines, Erik M.; Moore, James L.; Ford, Donna Y. (2023). "Equity perspectives of school stakeholders regarding the representation and access of black male students in an academy of engineering". School Science and Mathematics. 123 (3): 125–136. doi:10.1111/ssm.12578. S2CID 258140697.
