= James Cowie =

James Cowie may refer to:

- James Cowie (artist) (1886–1956), Scottish painter and artist
- Jimmy Cowie (James G. Cowie, died 1966), Scottish footballer
- James Cowie (Australian settler) (1809–1892), mayor of Geelong and Victorian colonial politician

== See also ==
- Cowie (surname)
- Cowie (disambiguation)
