= Noliwe Rooks =

American academic and author

- Born: 1963 (age 62–63)
- Occupation: Professor

Academic background
- Education: University of Iowa

Academic work
- Institutions: University of Missouri; Princeton University; Cornell University; Brown University
- Notable works: Hair Raising: Beauty, Culture and African American Women Ladies Pages: African American Women's Magazines and the Culture that Made Them White Money/Black Power: African American Studies and the Crises of Race in Higher Education Cutting School: Privatization, Segregation, and the End of Public Education

Noliwe Rooks (born 1963) is an American academic and author. She is the L. Herbert Ballou University Professor and chair of Africana Studies at Brown University and is the founding director of the Segrenomics Lab at Brown. She previously held the W.E.B. Du Bois Professorship of Literature at Cornell University.

== Early life and education ==
Rooks was born in 1963 to Belvie Rooks, a writer from the Fillmore District in San Francisco. Rooks spent her childhood in San Francisco with her mother and in Florida with her father and grandmother. She also traveled with her mother to Africa and the Caribbean.

Rooks earned her B.A. in English from Spelman College and her M.A. and Ph.D. in American Studies from the University of Iowa.

== Career ==
By 1996, Rooks was one of the first Black professors in the College of Arts and Sciences at the University of Missouri–Kansas City. She was the associate director of the African-American program at Princeton University for ten years, and published White Money, Black Power: The Surprising History of African American Studies and the Crisis of Race in Higher Education while she was there.

Rooks arrived at Cornell University in 2012 as an associate professor of Africana studies. At Cornell, Rooks was the W.E.B. Du Bois Professor of Literature and published Cutting School: Privatization, Segregation, and the End of Public Education. In Cutting School, Rooks coined the term "segrenomics" to describe a form of profit derived by businesses that continue to sell what she describes as "separate, segregated, and unequal forms of education" during the modern era of privatization and deregulation of public education.

After the spring 2021 semester at Cornell, she joined the faculty of Brown.

In 2025, Rooks was elected to the Society of American Historians, which identifies and celebrates distinguished historical writing.

== Books ==
- Rooks, Noliwe (1996). Hair Raising: Beauty, Culture and African American Women. New Brunswick, NJ: Rutgers University Press. ISBN 9780813523118.
- Rooks, Noliwe (2004). Ladies Pages: African American Women's Magazines and the Culture that Made Them. New Brunswick, NJ: Rutgers University Press. ISBN 9780813534244.
- Rooks, Noliwe (2006). On This They Stand: An Overview of Black Women's Studies. Ann Arbor, Michigan. OCLC 426828620
- Rooks, Noliwe (2007). White Money/Black Power: African American Studies and the Crises of Race in Higher Education. Boston, MA: Beacon Press. ISBN 9780807032718.
- Rooks, Noliwe (2017). Cutting School: Privatization, Segregation, and the End of Public Education. New York: The New Press. ISBN 9781620975985.

== Critical reception ==
=== Hair Raising: Beauty, Culture and African American Women ===
In a review of Hair Raising: Beauty, Culture and African American Women for Signs, Paulla A. Ebron of Stanford University writes, "Rooks usefully disrupts a black/white binary in which racism necessarily constructs singular standards of beauty." In a review of Jazz by Toni Morrison, Richard Pearce of Wheaton College writes in Narrative, "In Hair Raising, an exemplary study of African American beauty discourse, Rooks traces and analyzes the major shifts in advertising tactics of the African American beauty industry from the nineteenth to the early twentieth century", before describing some of her analysis in detail over several pages.

=== Ladies Pages: African American Women's Magazines and the Culture that Made Them ===
In a review of Ladies Pages: African American Women's Magazines and the Culture that Made Them for African American Review, Cynthia A. Callahan of the Ohio State University at Mansfield writes, "Rooks's study performs an important service by identifying these publications and situating them in the mutually informative contexts of the postbellum Great Migration, the rise of consumer culture, and African American women's attempts to redefine the sexual stereotypes applied to them in the dominant culture." In a review for The Journal of Blacks in Higher Education, Camille A. Clarke writes, "Rooks' research provides a wealth of information about the impact that early black women's magazine writers had in shaping the minds of Negro women around the turn of the century." In a review for American Periodicals, Frances Smith Foster of Emory University writes, "The most useful elements of this book for print culture scholars are that it brings attention to the existence of African American women's magazines, provides brief biographies of the lives and times of some women who edited and wrote for them, and lays a broad foundation of analysis upon which others can and should build. The most exciting thing about this book is that Rooks' persistent sleuthing has discovered extant copies of periodicals long thought forever lost."

=== White Money/Black Power: African American Studies and the Crises of Race in Higher Education ===
In an essay review of White Money/Black Power: African American Studies and the Crises of Race in Higher Education for The Journal of African American History, Alan Colón of Dillard University concludes, "The Black Studies movement, and the tradition from which it emanated, requires documentation, analysis, and interpretation that surpasses what is found in White Money/Black Power." In an essay review for The Black Scholar, Perry A. Hall concludes, "There are, as indicated, ideas within her text that could bear fruitful discussion. However, in the form they have been presented - buried and entangled in flaws in logic and structure, and gaps in perspective - they are largely unusable." In The Journal of African American History, James B. Stewart of Pennsylvania State University writes, "Hall took Rooks to task appropriately for ignoring the comprehensive exploration of the origin and evolution of Black/Africana Studies contained in the volume by Dolores Aldridge and Carlene Young, Out of the Revolution: The Development of Africana Studies (2000)." Publishers Weekly describes the book as "Perhaps too specialized for general readers, this volume is a must for anyone working in the field."

=== Cutting School: Privatization, Segregation, and the End of Public Education ===
In a review of Cutting School: Privatization, Segregation, and the End of Public Education (The New Press, 2017), Kirkus Reviews writes, "Weighing in on the charged topic of public education, Rooks [...] mounts a blistering and persuasive argument against school reforms that she sees as detrimental to disadvantaged students." Publishers Weekly writes that Rooks "introduces the term segrenomics, which she defines as 'the business of profiting from high levels of racial and economic segregation.'" In a review for Education and Urban Society, Lauren Martin, Katie Loomis and Jemimah L. Young write, "Rooks tells the story of racism and segregation in America with a beautiful and heartbreakingly human element that captures the essence of where we stand in education today." Wendy Lecker writes in the Stamford Advocate, "Rooks illustrates how officials and 'reformers' have virtually ignored successful models for education, such as: adequate funding, integration, and community-initiated reforms." In a February 2018 article for The New York Times, Tayari Jones named Cutting School as the last book that had made her furious, writing, "My hair almost caught on fire when I read the chapter about single moms tossed into prison - prison - for trying to enroll their children into schools in better-resourced neighborhoods. [...] This is an important work; hopefully it will make people mad enough to act."

== Honors and awards ==
- Hair Raising: Beauty, Culture and African American Women won the 1997 Outstanding University Press Book Award from the Public Library Association and the 1997 Choice Award for Outstanding Academic Book.
- Cutting School: Privatization, Segregation, and the End of Public Education was a finalist for the 2018 Legacy Award from the Hurston/Wright Foundation in the nonfiction category.
