= Cowie Bridge =

Roadway bridge in Aberdeenshire, Scotland

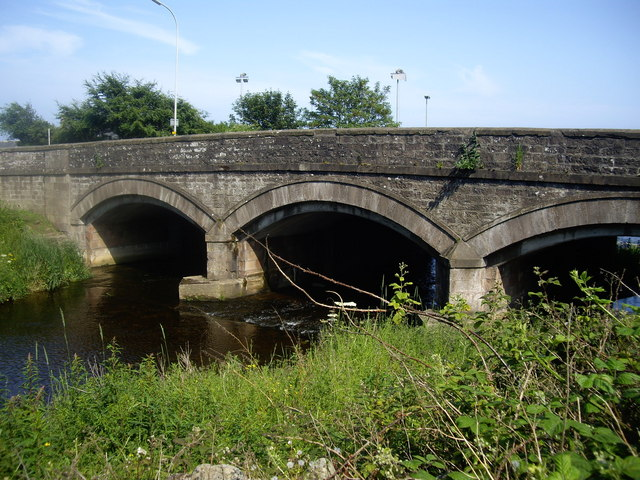
- Cowie Bridge in 2009
- Coordinates: 56.9678°N 2.2093°W
- OS grid reference: NO 87372 86308
- Carries: B979
- Crosses: Cowie Water
- Locale: Aberdeenshire
- Preceded by: Glenury Viaduct
- Followed by: Bay Walk Bridge

Characteristics
- Design: Arch
- Material: Stone

Listed Building – Category B
- Official name: Cowie Bridge Over Cowie Water
- Designated: 17 August 1972
- Reference no.: LB41613

Location
- Interactive map of Cowie Bridge

Cowie Bridge is a roadway bridge which carries the B979 across the mouth of the Cowie Water in Stonehaven, Aberdeenshire, Scotland. The bridge comprises 3 segmental arches with hoodmoulds and V-cutwaters on bull-faced bases. It was originally a single-width bridge but was later extended to be wide enough for two road lanes and footways at each side.

Historically, the area to the North of the Cowie Bridge site has been an old fishing village known as Cowie Village. Between the Cowie Bridge and the North Sea, a newer pedestrian bridge is in place, which also supports a new pipeline structure. The site of Cowie Bridge is approximately the point of the southern terminus of the Causey Mounth trackway, which was the only available medieval route crossing the coastal Grampian Mountains northerly by way of Muchalls Castle and Gillybrands.

== See also ==
- Cowie Castle
- Chapel of St. Mary and St. Nathalan
- List of bridges in Scotland
