= Dowie =

Dowie is a surname. Notable people with the surname include:

- Andrew Dowie (born 1981), Canadian politician
- Andy Dowie (born 1983), Scottish footballer
- Freda Dowie (1928–2019), British actress
- Iain Dowie (born 1965), football player
- John Dowie (disambiguation), various people
- Ménie Muriel Dowie (1867–1945), British writer
- Natasha Dowie (born 1988), English football player

== See also ==
- Cowie (surname)
- Bowie (surname)
