= Baron of Cowie =

Title of nobility in the Baronage of Scotland

Baron of Cowie is a title of nobility in the Baronage of Scotland.

Stirlingshire – a historic county of Scotland

The barony was created in the early 12th century by King David I. In 1563, Adam Erskine, the perpetual Commendator of Cambuskenneth, the head of the Abbey, signed a charter of some of its lands to John, 6th Lord Erskine. Erskine was granted the lands of Cowy, Murtoun and Baddnidayth in the barony of Cowy in the Sheriffdom of Stirling. Erskine later became the Earl of Mar. The original Barony lands were between Cowie and Stirling, starting just north of the town of Bannockburn.

== History ==
The name Cowie probably comes from the Gaelic word Collaidh, meaning wooded place. Cowie has been occupied since at least Neolithic times. In the Middle Ages, Cowie was held directly by the King. In the early 12th century, King David I gave lands of Cowie to Cambuskenneth Abbey. In 1207, the lands of Cowie were again confirmed upon Cambuskenneth Abbey. During the middle of the 16th century, the Protestant Reformation transformed the Scottish social and political landscape. When the nation formally adopted Protestantism in 1560, one of these reforms was the abolition of monasteries, abbeys and other church lands. Cambuskenneth was closed and many of the buildings were looted and destroyed, including the removal of stones for construction work in Stirling Castle.

The Barony remained primarily in the Erskine family (with some Stewart holders) from 1563 until the first Jacobite rebellion. In 1715, John, 6th Earl of Mar (9th Baron of Cowie), became a leader of the Jacobite rebellion of James Edward Stuart, the Old Pretender. Mar had no military experience and was a poor general. In an indecisive battle at Sheriffmuir in 1715, Mar was unable to defeat a smaller force under the Duke of Argyll. With the failure of the ’15, Mar fled with the Pretender to France, where he spent the rest of his life in exile. In 1716, a Writ of Attainder was passed against Mar, which stripped him and his heirs of all their lands and titles. The Murrays of Polmaise were one of the beneficiaries of the Attainder. In 1716, Sir William Murray of Touchadam and Polmaise became the first Murray holder of Cowie. He died childless and was succeeded by his uncle William Murray, 8th of Touchadam & of Pitlochrie and Polmaise in 1729. He succeeded by his son William Murray of Touchadam, Pitlochie and Polmaise in 1758. The Barony remained in the Murray family until 1926 before returning to the Stewarts.

The current Baron of Cowie is Alan Robert Dennis, a professor of information systems in the Kelley School of Business at Indiana University., who holds the John T. Chambers Chair of Internet Systems.

== See also ==
- Barons in Scotland
- Barony of Cowie (Aberdeenshire)
- Stirlingshire
- Stirling Castle
