= Risk governance =

Institutions and processes to reduce risk

Risk governance refers to the institutions, rules conventions, processes and mechanisms by which decisions about risks are taken and implemented. It can be both normative and positive, because it analyses and formulates risk management strategies to avoid and/or reduce the human and economic costs caused by disasters.

Risk governance goes beyond traditional risk analysis to include the involvement and participation of various stakeholders as well as considerations of the broader legal, political, economic and social contexts in which a risk is evaluated and managed.

The scope of risk governance encompasses public health and safety, the environment, old and new technologies, security, finance, and many others.

As an interdisciplinary field of research, risk governance draws insight from such diverse fields as toxicology, epidemiology, psychology, sociology, anthropology and economics.

== See also ==
- International Risk Governance Center
- Emergency management
- Decision theory
