= Glenury Viaduct =

19th century bridge in Aberdeenshire, Scotland

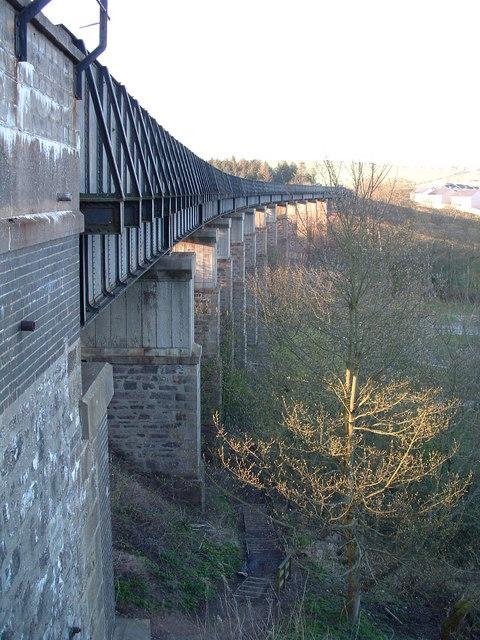
- The bridge in 2006
- Coordinates: 56.97394°N 2.21600°W
- OS grid reference: NO 86968 86990
- Carries: Dundee–Aberdeen line
- Crosses: Cowie Water
- Locale: Aberdeenshire

Characteristics
- No. of spans: 14

History
- Opened: 1849

Listed Building – Category B
- Official name: Glenury Viaduct, U/b Ecn5/340
- Designated: 23 March 2006
- Reference no.: LB50258

Location
- Interactive map of Glenury Viaduct

Glenury Viaduct is a double-track railway viaduct in Stonehaven, Scotland. It is Category B listed. The viaduct is situated north of Stonehaven railway station and adjacent to Mineralwell Park.

== History ==
On 18 May 1848 during construction of the viaduct, an accident involving a crane resulted in a worker being killed and two others being injured.

The viaduct was completed in 1849 and the line was opened to Limpet Mill railway station. In June 1884, work began to replace the wooden arches with a new iron deck. The contractor for the project was Blakie Brothers of Aberdeen. During the reconstruction, a single track remained operational. The work was completed in February 1885 at a cost of approximately £28,000.

In the late 1970s, the viaduct was refurbished. The deteriorating iron trestles supporting the deck were enclosed in concrete and timber decking was replaced with steel.

== See also ==
- List of bridges in Scotland
