= Wolfgang Kröger =

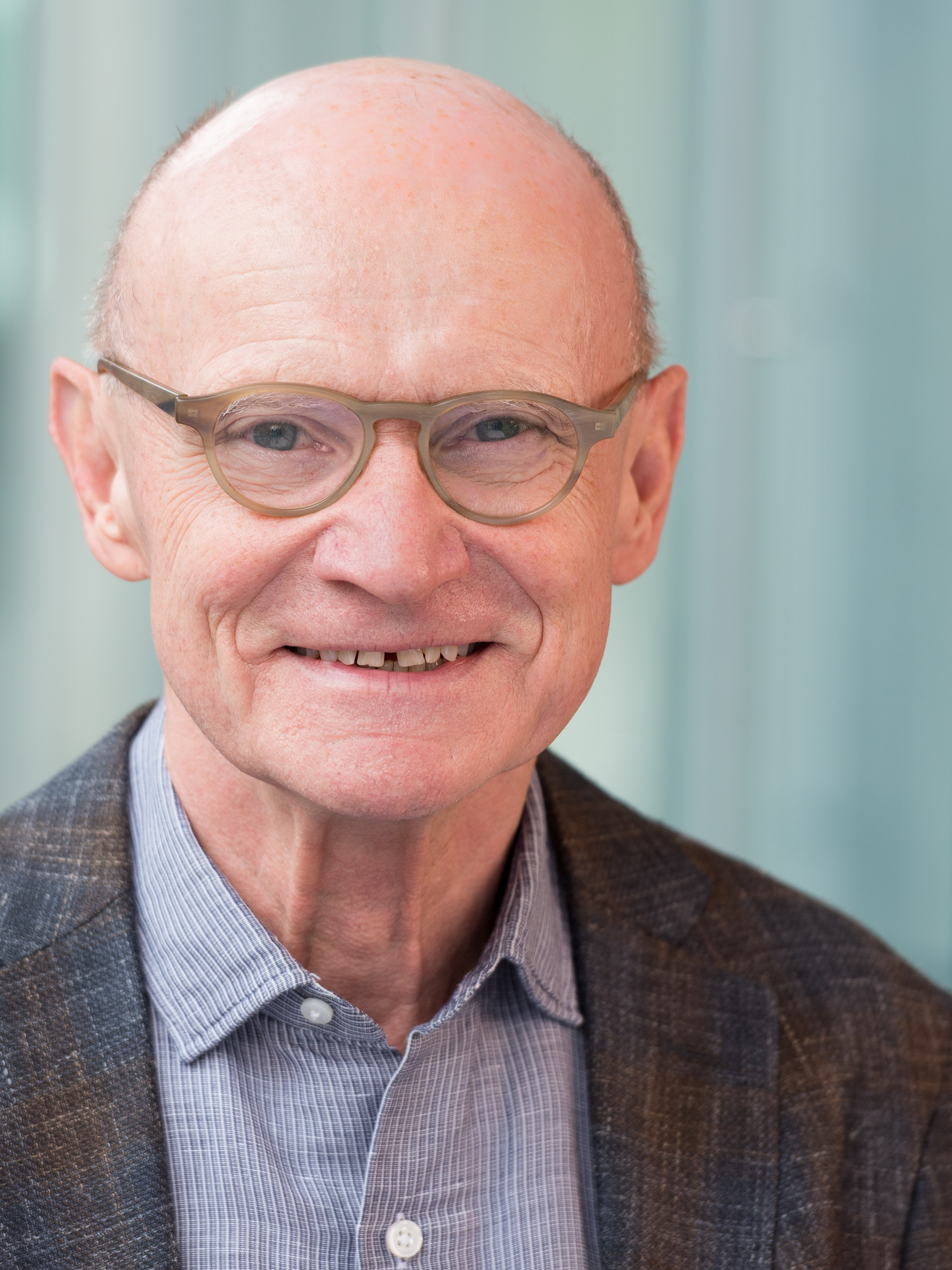
Professor Dr. Wolfgang Kröger in 2020

Wolfgang Kröger (born August 27, 1945, in Herne, Germany) has been full professor of Safety Technology at the ETH Zurich since 1990 and director of the Laboratory of Safety Analysis simultaneously. Before being elected Founding Rector of International Risk Governance Council (IRGC) in 2003, he headed research in nuclear energy and safety at the Paul Scherrer Institut (PSI). After his retirement early 2011 he became the executive director of the newly established ETH Risk Center. He has both Swiss and German citizenship and lives in Kilchberg, Zürich.

Kröger is a member of the Swiss Academy of Technical Science and heads the topical (SATW) platform “Autonomous Mobility”; he has been awarded “Distinguished Affiliate Professor” by the Technical University of Munich in 2012., and "Senior Fellow" of IASS Potsdam and is elected member of the project on Future Energy Systems of three German academies.

== Education and career ==
Wolfgang Kröger studied mechanical engineering, specialized on nuclear technology, at the RWTH Aachen University, completed his doctorate in 1974, also at RWTH Aachen, and his habilitation thesis in 1986, which focused on safety requirements for urban-sited nuclear power plants. He joined the Institute for Nuclear Safety Research at National Research Center Jülich (FZJ, former KFA), Germany, in 1974, led projects on underground siting of nuclear power plants and on application of PSA-methodology to HTGR (High-Temperature Gas-cooled Reactor). He became deputy and finally acting director (1987) of that institute before he accepted the call to ETH Zurich and, simultaneously, became also research department head and member of the board of directors at Paul Scherrer Institute (PSI) in 1990. In 2003 he gave up the position at PSI and served as Founding Rector and vice-president of the IRGC located at Geneva, and in parallel directed the Lab of Safety Analysis of ETH's department of mechanical and process engineering (MAVT). After his retirement early 2011 to end of 2014 he was mandated founding executive director of the ETH Risk Center and established the project of Future Resilient Systems at CREATE in Singapore. At present he does research on more resilient socio-technical systems and, more sustainable (acceptable) energy technologies including novel super-safe nuclear concepts and smarter, more resilient grids. He is engaged in a project on learning from worldwide past nuclear events, contributes to safety assessment and validation of autonomous vehicles and works as advisor to scientific institutions.

He joined the Institute of Advanced Sustainability Studies (IASS) Potsdam as Senior Fellow to help framing the concept of resilience and systematic risks in 2018.

== Scientific research ==
He has worked on extensions of probabilistic safety analysis (PSA) for nuclear power plants, including the integration of passive safety systems and inherent safety characteristics into traditional PSA frameworks that were originally developed for active safety systems.

His work includes applications of binary decision diagrams (BDDs) for the quantification of logic tree models containing large numbers of basic events. He has also contributed to modelling human–system interactions in accident scenarios using accident dynamic simulators (ADS) and discrete dynamic event trees (DDET).

More recently, he has been involved in work on precursor analysis as a complement to conventional PSA methods. This includes the use of simplified generic models and datasets, as well as the development of an open database containing more than 1,250 safety-significant events for use in risk analysis studies.

He worked on the modeling and simulation of complex, widely ramified critical infrastructure networks and mutual dependencies, turning them into a “systems-of-systems”. All approaches followed holistic system thinking. The innovative methods encompass complex network theory (CNT) and agent-based multilayer modeling (ABM) in combination with Monte Carlo simulation and high-level-architecture (HLA).

He has worked on efforts to analyse systems/options in the energy supply sector holistically under consideration of the total life cycle. He has been involved in making terms “sustaina-bility” and “resilience” more concrete and operational, the first by a set of representative quantifiable indicators and second by means to increase systems’ “soft landing capabilities”.

He has deliberated on needs and ways to exploit nuclear energy in a regime of self-controlled by inherent or passive physical means under accident conditions and eased burden for waste disposal, all by novel combination of key design factors. More stringent design requirements have been elaborated and tested against candidate reactor and fuel cycle concepts.

More recently he has started to address reliability and risk issues of high-level automated vehicles. A proposal has been made to complement existing safety goals by aggregated target values and how to bring back stranded vehicles from minimal risk condition to operation.

=== National and international cooperation ===
He put the management of man-made technological, trans-boundary risks into a broader context by establishing the International Risk Governance Council (IRGC) as an independent organization. Founded in 2003, the IRGC follows a trans-sectorial and multi-disciplinary approach and promotes multi-stakeholder participation, where appropriate. From mid-2011 to end of 2014 he helped to build up the ETH Risk Center, which pools the expertise of professors from various departments/disciplines. Its joint research output should support society and industry to better manage risk portfolios and design novel solutions for collaborative risk reduction and resilience enhancing schemes. Furthermore, he accountably prepared the proposal for a huge integrated research project on Future Resilient Systems, integrating combinations from ETH and top Singaporean universities; it was approved by the National Research Foundation of Singapore (NRF) for funding and launched in November 2014 and meanwhile entered and completed its second phase.

== Books and selected publications ==
=== Selected books ===
- Kröger, W., Stankovski, A., Nuclear fuel from cradle to grave: Existing variants and future options for the fuel cycle and resulting waste types, in Röhlig, K. (editor), IOP Books on Radwaste, accepted for publication, Jan 2022
- Gethmann, C.F., Kamp, G., Knodt, M., Kröger, W., Streffer, C., von Storch, H., Ziesemer, T., Global Energy Supply and Emissions, Springer: 978-981-13-7445-6 (ISBN), Oct, 2020
- Kröger, W., Achieving resilience of large-scale engineered infrastructures, in Farsangi et al. (eds.), Resilient Structures and Infrastructures, Springer, May 2019
- Sornette, D., Kröger, W., Wheatley, S., New Ways and Needs for Exploiting Nuclear Energy, Springer: 978-3-319-97651-8 (ISBN), 2019
- Kröger, W. and Nan, C., Power systems in transition: dealing with complexity. In Energy as a Sociotechnical Problem, Routledge: 978-1-351-73673-2 (ISBN), 2018
- Kröger, W., Sansavini, G., Principles of disaster risk reduction, in Handbook of Protecting Electricity Networks from Natural Hazards, OSCE, 2016
- Nan, C., Sansavini, G., Kröger, W., Building an Integrated Metric for Quantifying the Resilience of Interdependent Infrastructure Systems, Panayiotou C. et al.(eds.), Critical Information Infrastructures Security, Springer: 978-3-319-31663-5(ISBN), 2016
- Kröger, W., Switzerland - a Resilient energy infrastructure, in Thoma, K. (ed.), Resilien-Tech – “Resilience-by-Design": a strategy for the technology issues of the future, Acatech Study, April, 2014
- Kröger, W., Nan, C., Addressing Interdependencies of Complex Technical Networks, D'Agostino, G., Scala, A. (eds.), Networks of Networks, Springer: Complexity, 978-3-319-03517-8 (ISBN), 2014
- Streffer, C., Gethmann, C.F., Kamp, G., Kröger, W., Rehbinder, E., Renn, O., Radioactive Waste, Springer, 978-3-642-22924-4 (ISBN), 2012
- Kröger, W., Zio, E., Vulnerable Systems, Springer, 978-0-85729-654-2 (ISBN), 2011

=== Selected articles in journals ===
- Kröger, Wolfgang; Brettin, Leon Johann (2026-08-07), Automated vehicles: Challenging transition from Minimal Risk Condition, arXiv:2608.07061
- Kröger, Wolfgang (2025). "How safe should automated vehicles be? - A survey and proposal for discussion". Next Research. 2 (2) 100238. doi:10.1016/j.nexres.2025.100238. ISSN 3050-4759.
- Ayoub, Ali; Kröger, Wolfgang; Sornette, Didier (2022). "Generic and adaptive probabilistic safety assessment models: Precursor analysis and multi-purpose utilization". Nuclear Engineering and Technology. 54 (8): 2924–2932. arXiv:2111.15391. Bibcode:2022NuEnT..54.2924A. doi:10.1016/j.net.2022.03.013. ISSN 1738-5733. Archived from the original on 2022-08-10.
- Kröger, W., Novel reactor concepts: Asset in a future energy mix? in Swiss Physical Society Focus No.1], Nuclear Energy Generation, July 2021
- Ayoub, Ali; Stankovski, Andrej; Kröger, Wolfgang; Sornette, Didier (2021). "The ETH Zurich curated nuclear events database: Layout, event classification, and analysis of contributing factors". Reliability Engineering & System Safety. 213 107781. doi:10.1016/j.ress.2021.107781. hdl:20.500.11850/485196. ISSN 0951-8320.
- Ayoub, Ali; Stankovski, Andrej; Kröger, Wolfgang; Sornette, Didier (2021). "Precursors and startling lessons: Statistical analysis of 1250 events with safety significance from the civil nuclear sector". Reliability Engineering & System Safety. 214 107820. doi:10.1016/j.ress.2021.107820. hdl:20.500.11850/490250. ISSN 0951-8320.
- Kröger, Wolfgang; Sornette, Didier; Ayoub, Ali (2020). "Towards Safer and More Sustainable Ways for Exploiting Nuclear Power". World Journal of Nuclear Science and Technology. 10 (3): 91–115. Bibcode:2020WJNST..10...91K. doi:10.4236/wjnst.2020.103010. hdl:20.500.11850/465349. ISSN 2161-6795.
- Kröger, Wolfgang (2020-04-10). "Automated vehicle driving: background and deduction of governance needs". Journal of Risk Research. 24 (1): 14–27. doi:10.1080/13669877.2020.1750465. ISSN 1366-9877.
- Kröger, W. (2018), "Small-sized reactors of different types: Regulatory framework to be re-thought?", Topical Issues in Nuclear Installation Safety. Safety Demonstration of Advanced Water Cooled Nuclear Power Plants. V.2. Proceedings of an International Conference, pp. 87–91
- Kröger, Wolfgang (2017-02-10). "Securing the Operation of Socially Critical Systems from an Engineering Perspective: New Challenges, Enhanced Tools and Novel Concepts". European Journal for Security Research. 2 (1): 39–55. doi:10.1007/s41125-017-0013-9. ISSN 2365-0931.
- Kroger, Wolfgang; Sansavini, G. (2016). "Principles of risk reduction". Protecting Electricity Networks from Natural Hazards, OECD Handbook.
- Linkov, Igor; Bridges, Todd; Creutzig, Felix; Decker, Jennifer; Fox-Lent, Cate; Kröger, Wolfgang; Lambert, James H.; Levermann, Anders; Montreuil, Benoit; Nathwani, Jatin; Nyer, Raymond; Renn, Ortwin; Scharte, Benjamin; Scheffler, Alexander; Schreurs, Miranda (2014). "Changing the resilience paradigm". Nature Climate Change. 4 (6). Nature: 407–409. Bibcode:2014NatCC...4..407L. doi:10.1038/nclimate2227.
- Sornette, D.; Maillart, T.; Kröger, W. (2013). "Exploring the limits of safety analysis in complex technological systems". International Journal of Disaster Risk Reduction. 6: 59–66. arXiv:1207.5674. Bibcode:2013IJDRR...6...59S. doi:10.1016/j.ijdrr.2013.04.002. ISSN 2212-4209.
- Bilis, Evangelos I.; Kroger, Wolfgang; Cen Nan (2013). "Performance of Electric Power Systems Under Physical Malicious Attacks". IEEE Systems Journal. 7 (4): 854–865. Bibcode:2013ISysJ...7..854B. doi:10.1109/jsyst.2012.2223512. ISSN 1932-8184.
- Nan, Cen; Eusgeld, Irene; Kröger, Wolfgang (2013). "Analyzing vulnerabilities between SCADA system and SUC due to interdependencies". Reliability Engineering & System Safety. 113: 76–93. doi:10.1016/j.ress.2012.12.014. ISSN 0951-8320.
- Eusgeld, Irene; Kröger, Wolfgang; Sansavini, Giovanni; Schläpfer, Markus; Zio, Enrico (2009). "The role of network theory and object-oriented modeling within a framework for the vulnerability analysis of critical infrastructures". Reliability Engineering & System Safety. 94 (5): 954–963. Bibcode:2009RESS...94..954E. doi:10.1016/j.ress.2008.10.011. ISSN 0951-8320.
- Kröger, Wolfgang (2008). "Critical infrastructures at risk: A need for a new conceptual approach and extended analytical tools". Reliability Engineering & System Safety. 93 (12): 1781–1787. Bibcode:2008RESS...93.1781K. doi:10.1016/j.ress.2008.03.005. ISSN 0951-8320.
