= International Risk Governance Center =

Swiss foundation and think tank

- Founded: 2003; 23 years ago in Geneva, Switzerland
- Type: Interdisciplinary Center
- Purpose: Risk governance Risk management Regulations; Policy; Science
- Headquarters: École polytechnique fédérale de Lausanne, Lausanne, Switzerland
- Region served: Worldwide
- Website: www.epfl.ch/research/domains/irgc/

The International Risk Governance Center (IRGC) is a Swiss independent foundation and think tank that focuses risk management and provides information to decision-makers, particularly legislators and companies. It is based at the École Polytechnique Fédérale de Lausanne (EPFL) in Lausanne, Switzerland.

IRGC develops risk governance strategies that focus on involving all key stakeholder groups, including citizens, governments, businesses and academia. It exists to improve the understanding, management and governance of emerging and systemic risks that may have significant adverse consequences for human health, the environment, the economy, and society. Its mission includes "developing concepts of risk governance, anticipating major risk issues and providing risk governance policy advice for key decision-makers."

== History ==
IRGC began as a non-profit called the International Risk Governance Council in 2003, when academics from various countries proposed to the Swiss State Secretariat for Education and Research to create an international and independent body with the mission to develop and implement concepts and actions to improve the governance of risk.

The Swiss Federal Assembly then created the International Risk Governance Council to bridge increasing gaps between science, technological development, decision-makers, and the public. It was formally founded in Geneva as a private foundation in June 2003.José Mariano Gago, the former Portuguese Minister for Science and Higher Education, was the first chairman of the Foundation Board followed by Donald J. Johnston and Granger M. Morgan. Wolfgang Kröger was the founding rector.

In July 2012, the council was granted special consultative status with the United Nations Economic and Social Council (ECOSOC). As of January 1, 2013, the International Risk Governance Council signed a formal collaboration agreement with EPFL and moved to Lausanne. The goal of this move was strengthened collaboration with academia, which allowed the council to expand its academic network and further develop its science-based approach. In July 2014, it became a member of the Sustainable Development Solutions Network (SDSN).

In 2016, the Council became the International Risk Governance Center (IRGC) at EPFL, where it continues to develop the original mission and activities.

== Activities ==
IRGC's work is rooted in the IRGC Risk Governance Framework, which was developed to provide guidance to organizations and society for identifying and managing risks in situations of complexity, uncertainty or ambiguity. IRGC develops risk governance concepts and has developed numerous frameworks, including on the governance of emerging and systemic risks. These frameworks are applied to a wide range of specific risk domains.

IRGC's frameworks are used by numerous institutions and organizations, including the European Food Safety Authority, the Health Council of the Netherlands, the US Environmental Protection Agency, the OECD, and the European Commission.

At EPFL, IRGC is one of the centers that act at the interface between academic research and education, and business and policy. IRGC interacts with the EPFL community and contributes a risk governance approach to their activities.

In recent years, IRGC has focused increasingly on risks associated with emerging technologies. Currently, IRGC is active in the areas of nanotechnology, climate engineering, the low-carbon transition, space debris collision risk, deepfakes, and governance of digital technology.

Past areas of focus include biosecurity, precision medicine, synthetic biology, unconventional gas development, bioenergy, and critical infrastructure.

== See also ==
- Risk analysis
- Risk governance
- Risk management
