= Alan R. Dennis =

Canadian information technologist (born 1960)

- Born: Alan Robert Dennis; 1960 (age 65–66); Prince Edward Island, Canada
- Title: Professor
- Awards: Association for Information Systems LEO Award (2021)

Academic background
- Education: B. Computer Science, 1982, Acadia University; MBA, 1984, Queen's University; PhD, Business Administration, 1991, University of Arizona

Alan Robert Dennis (born 1960) is a Canadian-American scientist specializing in Information Systems. He is a professor and holds the John T. Chambers Chair of Internet Systems at the Kelley School of Business, Indiana University.

== Career ==
Dennis began his academic career as a professor at The University of Georgia and moved to Indiana University's Kelley School of Business, becoming the first John T. Chambers Chair of Internet Systems.

Dennis has authored over 150 research papers, chaired 16 dissertations, and co-authored four books. His research explores team collaboration, the spread of fake news on social media, cybersecurity, and artificial intelligence.

He received the title Baron of Cowie in 2020 following the death of his father, G. Douglas Dennis. Dennis has one son who is an Assistant Professor of Information Systems at Iowa State University.

== Awards and recognition ==
Dennis was named AIS Fellow in 2012 by the Association for Information Systems (AIS) for significant global contributions to Information Systems.

Baronage of Scotland
Preceded by G. Dennis, Baron of Cowie (his father)	Baron of Cowie; 2020-present	Succeeded by incumbent
