= Barony of Cowie =

The Barony of Cowie is a geographical and political division of land in Aberdeenshire, Scotland deriving from the Middle Ages. King Robert the Bruce conferred these lands of the Barony of Cowie, along with the Barony of Cluny and the Barony of Kinnaird upon Alexander Fraser of Touchfraser and Cowie, who was his Chamberlain at least as late as 1319 AD. The major transport route across the Barony of Cowie in the Middle Ages was an ancient trackway known as the Elsick Mounth,

== See also ==
- Barony of Cowie, Stirlingshire
- Cowie, Aberdeenshire
- Cowie Castle
- Cowie Water
- Muchalls Castle
