= Potential Plus UK =

National association in the United Kingdom

- Abbreviation: PPUK
- Formation: 1967
- Legal status: Non-profit organisation
- Location: Milton Keynes, MK6 7AA
- Region served: UK
- Website: Potential Plus UK

Potential Plus UK, officially the National Association for Gifted Children (NAGC), was a national association based in Milton Keynes in the United Kingdom, that offered support for high learning potential (gifted and talented) children, their parents and schools. It was a registered charity under English law.

The organization aimed to support the social, emotional and learning needs of children with high learning potential. This included children who have been identified as gifted and talented; children who have the potential to achieve through a wide range of abilities in academic subjects, sport, the arts and leadership; those who are dual or multiple exceptional (giftedness coupled with a disability or learning difficulty, also known as twice exceptional or 2e) and the profoundly gifted.

There is an organization of the same name and acronym (NAGC) in the United States, with a similar remit and scope.

In 2026 it was absorbed into the Coram children's charity following a period where it's income exceeded it's expenditure in 4 of 5 years.
