= Thomas Jefferson Cowie =

United States Navy admiral (1857–1936)

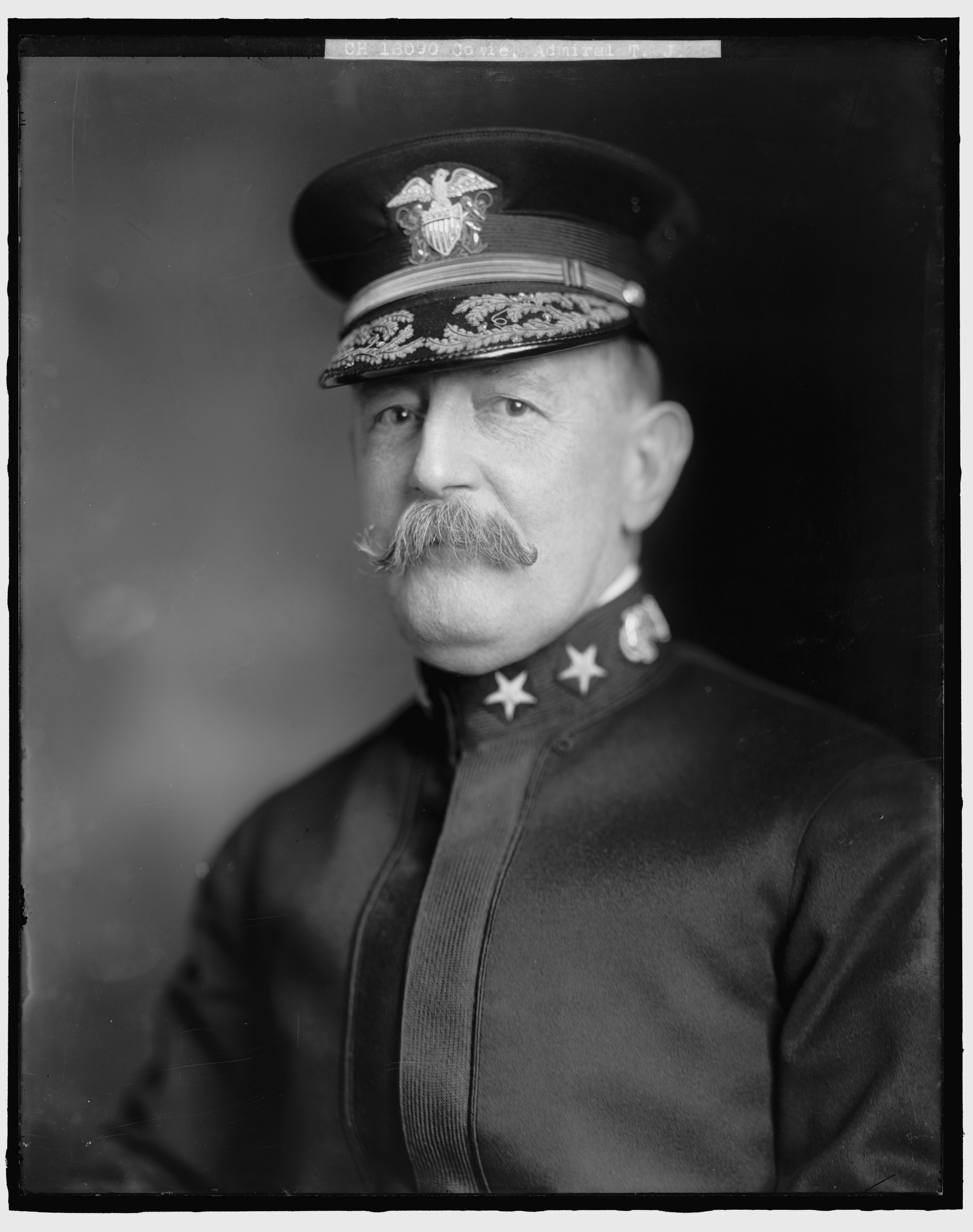
- Born: February 15, 1857; Montezuma, Iowa, US
- Died: July 16, 1936 (aged 79); Washington, D.C., US
- Burial place: Arlington National Cemetery
- Military career
- Allegiance: United States of America
- Branch: United States Navy
- Service years: 1878–1921
- Rank: Rear Admiral
- Conflicts: World War I
- Awards: Navy Cross

Thomas Jefferson Cowie (February 15, 1857 – July 16, 1936) was a Rear Admiral in the United States Navy whose active-duty career included serving as Navy Paymaster General and Chief of the Bureau of Supplies and Accounts (BuSandA). Following his retirement, he headed the Navy's Liberty Loans program and was secretary-treasurer of the Navy Mutual Aid Association.

== Biography ==
Cowie was born at Montezuma, Iowa, in 1857. He served as engineer's yeoman in USS Alliance from January 8, 1877, to October 19, 1878, then enlisted in the Navy October 21, 1878, at Constantinople.

He was commissioned as assistant paymaster from June 16, 1880, rising to the rank of Rear Admiral and the position of Paymaster General and Chief of the Bureau of Supplies and Accounts July 1, 1910.

Rear Admiral Cowie was awarded the Navy Cross for his valuable services in connection with the Liberty Loans of World War I. Retired from the Navy on February 15, 1921, he was ordered to special duty in charge of the Navy Liberty Loan section of the Navy Allotment Office in March 1921, and in June 1923 was ordered to additional duty as secretary-treasurer of the Navy Mutual Aid Association, a position which he held until his death on July 16, 1936, in Washington, D.C. He and his wife Susie A. Cowie (1859–1938) are buried at Arlington National Cemetery.

== Namesake ==
The destroyer USS Cowie (DD-632) was named in his honor.

== Gallery ==
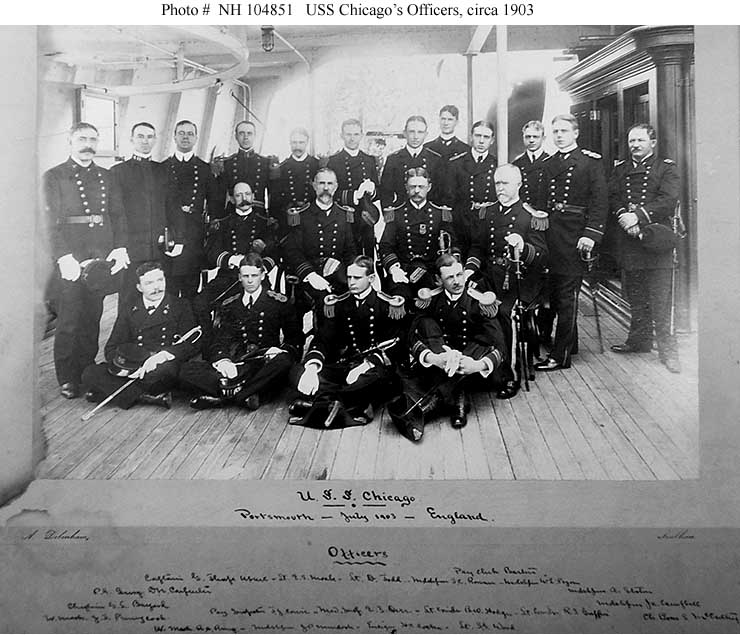
Cowie as a lieutenant commander, seated on the left in the second row in this photograph of the officers of the protected cruiser USS Chicago, c. 1903.
