= Helen Cowie (bullying expert) =

British social scientist

Helen Cowie FBPS, PGCE, is Emeritus Professor in the Health and Social Care division of the Faculty of Health and Medical Sciences at the University of Surrey.

== Career ==
She is concerned with the promotion of emotional health and well-being in children and young people and is a world authority on bullying in schools, the home and the workplace. Professor Cowie is currently Director of the UK Observatory for the Promotion of Non-Violence at the University of Surrey.

== Honorary positions ==
- 1998–present: Fellow of the British Psychological Society
- 2008-2009: Visiting Professor at Hiroshima University, Japan
- 2010 – 2017: Visiting Professor at Brunel University. UK
- 2010 – present: Docent Professor at Abo Akademi University, Vaasa, Finland

== Publications ==
=== Selected books ===
- Jones, F., Cowie, H. & Tenenbaum, H. (2021) A School for Everyone: Stories and Lesson Plans to Teach Inclusivity and Social Issues. London: Hachette.
- Cowie, H. (2020). Peer Support in Schools. Malta: University of Malta. https://www.um.edu.mt/cres/our%5B%5D research/ourpublications
- Cowie, H. (2019) From Birth to Sixteen. Second Edition. London: Routledge. (212 pages)
- Cowie, H. & Myers, C-A. (2019) School Bullying and Mental Health: Risks, Intervention and Prevention. London: Routledge. (pp. 233) (Paperback edition)
- Cowie, H. & Myers, C-A. (2018). School Bullying and Mental Health: Risks, Intervention and Prevention. London: Routledge. (pp. 233) (Hardback edition)
- Cowie, H. (2018). The Development of Children’s Imaginative Writing. (Reprinted from Croom Helm 1984 in Routledge Revivals) London: Routledge. (pp. 237)
- Cowie, H. (2018). Counselling: Approaches and Issues in Education. (Reprinted from David Fulton 1994 in Routledge Revivals). London: Routledge. (pp. 129)
- Cowie, H. (2018). Peer Counselling in Schools. (Reprinted from David Fulton 1996 in Routledge Revivals). London: Routledge. (pp. 153)
- Cowie, H., Smith, P. K., Boulton, M. & Laver, R. (2018). Cooperation in the Multi-Ethnic Classroom (Reprinted from David Fulton 1994 in Routledge Revivals). London: Routledge. (pp. 214)
- Cowie, H. & Myers, C-A. (2016). Bullying Among University Students: Cross-national Perspectives. London: Routledge. (pp. 213)
- Cowie, H. & Jennifer, D. (2008) New Perspectives on Bullying. Maidenhead: Open University Press
- Cowie, H. & Jennifer, D. (2007) Managing Violence in Schools. London: SAGE Publications
- Smith, P.K., Cowie, H. & Blades, M. (Fifth Edition) (2010). Understanding Children’s Development. Oxford: Blackwell.
- Cowie, H., Boardman, C., Dawkins, J. & Jennifer, D. (2004) Emotional Health and Well-Being. London: SAGE Publications
- Cowie, H. & Wallace, P. (2000). Peer Support in Action. London: SAGE Publications

=== Recent journal articles ===
- Cowie, H. & Myers, C-A (2020). The impact of the COVID-19 pandemic on the mental health and well-being of children and young people, Children & Society. 35(1): 62-74 https://onlinelibrary.wiley.com/doi/full/10.1111/chso.12430
- Myers, C-A. & Cowie, H. (2019). Cyberbullying across the educational lifespan, Journal of Environmental Research and Public Health, 16(7): 1-17.
- Myers, C-A. & Cowie, H. (2018). Bullying at university: The social and legal contexts of cyberbullying among university students, Journal of Cross-Cultural Psychology, 48 (8): 1172-1182.
- Cowie, H. & Myers, C-A. (2018) Bullying amongst students in further and higher education: the role of counsellors in addressing the issue, University and College Counselling, 6(3): 12-16.
- Myers, C-A. & Cowie, H. (2016). How can we prevent and reduce bullying amongst university students? International Journal of Emotions in Education, 8(1): 109-119.
- Colliety, P., Royal, C. & Cowie, H. (2016). The unique role of the school nurse in the holistic care of the bully. British Journal of School Nursing, 11(9): 443-449.
- Cowie, H. & Colliety, P. (2016). Who cares about the bullies? Pastoral Care in Education, 34(1): 24-33.
- Cowie, H., Huser, C. & Myers, C. (2014). The use of participatory methods in researching the experiences of children and young people, Croatian Journal of Education, 16(2): 51-66.
- Myers, C-A. & Cowie, H. (2013) An investigation into the roles of victim, bully and bystanders in role-play incidents of cyberbullying amongst university students in England, Pastoral Care in Education, 31(3); 251-267.
- Cowie, H. (2013) Cyberbullying and its impact on young people’s emotional health and well-being, The Psychiatrist, 37: 167-170.
- Smith, P. & Cowie, H. (2010) Perspectives on emotional labour and bullying: reviewing the role of emotions in nursing and healthcare, International Journal of Work Organization and Emotion, 3(3): 227-236.
- Cowie, H. and Kurihara, S. (2009) Peer support in Japan: inside and outside perspectives, Gendai Esprit, 502, 61-72.
- Allan, H. T., Cowie, H. & Smith, P. A. (2009) Overseas nurses’ experiences of discrimination: a case of racist bullying? Journal of Nursing Management, 17: 898-906
- Cowie, H. (2009) Understanding why children and young people engage in bullying, Hiroshima University Journal of Learning Science, 2, 103-110.
- Naylor, P., Cowie, H., Dawkins, J., Talamelli, L. & Walters, J. (2009) Impact of a mental health teaching programme on adolescents: a two-group pre-test post-test control group design, British Journal of Psychiatry,194, 365-370.
- Cowie, H. (2009) Tackling cyberbullying: A cross cultural comparison, International Journal of Emotional Education, 1(2): 3-13.
- Cowie, H., Hutson, N., Oztug, O. and Myers, C. (2008) The impact of peer support schemes on pupils’ perceptions of bullying, aggression and safety at school, Emotional and Behavioural Difficulties, 13(1): 63-71.
- Cowie, H. and Oztug, O. (2008) Pupils’ perceptions of safety at school, Pastoral Care in Education, 26(2): 59-67.
- Myers, C., Hutson, N., Cowie, H. & Jennifer, D. 2008) Taking stock of violence in UK schools: risk, regulation and responsibility, Education and Urban Society, 40(4): 494-505.
- Hutson, N. & Cowie, H. (2007) Setting an e-mail peer support scheme, Pastoral Care in Education, 25(4): 12-16.
- Cowie, H., Hutson, N. & Myers, C. (2007) Young offenders in prison – perceptions of mental health disorders and their treatment: a qualitative analysis. International Journal on Violence at School, 4, 3-18.

=== Recent book chapters ===
- Cowie, H. (2019). Peer support. In S. Hupp & J. D. Jewell (Eds.) Wiley Encyclopedia of Child and Adolescent Development. Chichester: John Wiley & Sons.
- Cowie, H. & Myers, C-A. (2016). What do we know about bullying and cyberbullying among university students? In H. Cowie & C-A. Myers (Eds.) Bullying Among University Students. London: Routledge (pp. 3–14).
- Cowie, H. (2013) The immediate and long-term effects of bullying. I. Rivers & N. Duncan (Eds.) Bullying: Experiences and Discourses of Sexuality and Gender. London: Routledge, pp. 10–18.
- Cowie, H. & Smith, P. K. (2013) Peer support as a means of improving school safety and reducing bullying and violence. In A. Ovejero, P. K. Smith & S. Yubero (Eds.) El Acoso Escolar y Su Prevencion: Perspesctivas Internacionales. Biblioteca Nueva, pp. 263–285.
- Cowie, H., Bauman, S., Myers, C., Pörhöla, M. & Almeida, A. (2013) Cyberbullying amongst university students: an emergent cause for concern. In P. K. Smith & G. Steffgen (Eds.) Cyberbullying Through the New Media. London: Psychology Press, pp. 165–177.
- James. A., Cowie, H. & Toda, Y. (2013) Peer support. In: K. Yamasaki. Y. Toda & Y. Watanabe (Eds.) Prevention Education in the World. Tokyo: Kaneko-shoboh, pp. 147–1
- Cowie, H. & Smith, P. K. (2010) "Peer support as a means of improving school safety and reducing bullying and violence". In B. Doll, J. Charvat, J. Baker & G. Stoner (Eds.) Handbook of Prevention Research. New Jersey: Lawrence Erlbaum
- Cowie, H. (2010) Understanding why children and young people engage in bullying at school. In C. Barter & D. Berridge (eds.) Children Behaving Badly? Exploring Peer Violence Between Children and Young People.
- Cowie, H. (2010) Peer support in Japan: a perspective from the outside. In K. Östermann (ed.) Indirect and Direct Aggression. Frankfurt am Main, Peter Lang, pp. 133–142.
- Cowie, H. (2010) Core interventions to counteract school bullying. In T. Aoki (Ed.) Moral Education in Schools. Tokyo: Ya Publications.
- Cowie, H. (2009) Peer support challenges school bullying. In C. Cefai & P. Cooper (eds.) Promoting Emotional Education. London: Jessica Kingsley. (chapter 6)
- Jennifer, D. & Cowie, H. (2009) Engaging Children and Young People Actively in Research. In K. Bryan (ed.) Communication in Healthcare . London: Peter Lang European Academic Publishers
- Cowie, H. (2007) Programa de actuación para la violencia escolar (VISTA): un marco global para la escuela. In M. de Esteban Villar (ed.) Nuevos Retos para Convivir en las Aulas: Construyendo La Escuela Cīvica. Madrid: Fundación Europea Sociedad y Educación.
- Cowie, H. (2006) Young people themselves tackle the problem of school violence. In Österman, K., & Björkqvist, K. (Eds.). Contemporary research on aggression. Volume I: School violence. Proceedings of the XVI World Meeting of the International Society for Research on Aggression, Santorini, Greece, 2004. Åbo, Finland: Åbo Akademi University. pp 108–114.
