= Robert Cowie =

Scottish physician and author

Robert Cowie (1842–1874) was a Scottish physician and author.

== Life ==
He was born in 1842 at Lerwick, the capital of the Shetland Islands, where both his father and uncle were well-known medical practitioners. He was educated partly at Aberdeen, where he took the degree of M.A., and at Edinburgh, where he was a student of the anesthesia pioneer James Young Simpson.

On the death of his father he took up his medical practice, and was held in high esteem, both for his professional and general character. He died suddenly of peritonitis in 1874, in his thirty-third year. Cowie was an enthusiastic lover of his native islands, one proof of which was his selection of certain physical peculiarities of the Shetland people as the subject of his thesis when applying for the degree of M.D. At a later period he contributed to the International Congress at Paris an article on health and longevity, bringing out a prolongation of life beyond the average among the Shetlanders, which excited considerable notice.

== Works ==
The interest in Cowie's thesis papers led him to prepare them for publication with much material added in the following volume.

- Shetland: Descriptive and Historical; Being a Graduation Thesis on the Inhabitants of the Shetland Islands; and a Topographical Description of the Country. Edinburgh & Glasgow: John Menzies & Co. 1874.
