= USS Cowie =

Gleaves-class destroyer

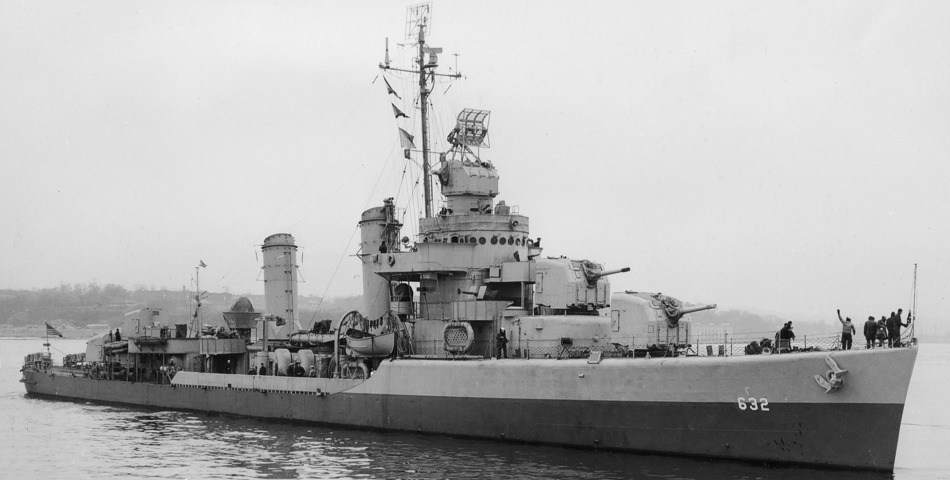
- USS Cowie (DD-632) off Boston in June 1945

History

United States
- Name: Cowie
- Namesake: Thomas Jefferson Cowie
- Builder: Boston Navy Yard
- Laid down: 18 March 1941
- Launched: 27 September 1941
- Commissioned: 1 June 1942
- Identification: DD-632
- Reclassified: DMS-39, 30 May 1945
- Decommissioned: 27 April 1947
- Stricken: 1 December 1970
- Fate: Sold 22 February 1972 and broken up for scrap

General characteristics
- Class & type: Gleaves-class destroyer
- Displacement: 1,630 tons
- Length: 348 ft 3 in (106.15 m)
- Beam: 36 ft 1 in (11.00 m)
- Draft: 11 ft 10 in (3.61 m)
- Propulsion: 50,000 shp (37,000 kW); 4 boilers; 2 propellers
- Speed: 37.4 knots (69 km/h)
- Range: 6,500 nmi (12,000 km; 7,500 mi) at 12 kn (22 km/h; 14 mph)
- Complement: 16 officers, 260 enlisted
- Armament: 4 × 5 in (127 mm)/38 caliber DP guns; 4 × 40 mm (1.6 in) guns; 7 × 20 mm (0.79 in) AA guns, 5 × 21 in (533 mm) torpedo tubes (5 Mark 15 torpedoes); 6 × depth charge projectors, 2 × depth charge tracks

USS Cowie (DD-632) (later DMS-39), a Gleaves-class destroyer, is the only ship of the United States Navy to be named for Rear Admiral Thomas Jefferson Cowie.

Cowie was launched on 27 September 1941 Liberty Fleet Day at the Boston Navy Yard; sponsored by Mrs. C. R. Robinson, daughter of Rear Admiral Cowie and wife of Captain C. R. Robinson. The ship was commissioned on 1 June 1942 and reported to the U.S. Atlantic Fleet.

== Service history ==
Departing New York 5 October 1942, Cowie escorted the escort carrier Chenango to Norfolk, then cruised on antisubmarine patrol off Cape Hatteras until 23 October when she sailed from Norfolk with Task Force 34 (TF 34) for the invasion of North Africa. She screened transports off Safi, French Morocco, from 8 to 13 November, and returned to New York on 25 November for repairs and upkeep. After training exercises with submarines off New London, Cowie sailed on escort duty, screening two convoys to Casablanca between 12 December 1942 and 28 April 1943.

Sailing from Norfolk for North Africa again 8 June 1943, Cowie sortied from Oran on 22 June for the invasion of Sicily. In the van of the invading forces, she contacted the British navigational marker submarine HMS Seraph on 9 July to guide the invasion landings at Scoglitti, Sicily, from 9 to 13 July, then took station to give fire support to the assault troops ashore. Cowie was one of those response to calls for fire support broke up the counterattack by German tanks against the 180th Regimental Combat Team on 11 July. Returning to Oran 16 July, Cowie sailed on local escort duty out of that port until 20 July when she arrived at Bizerte to patrol. She sortied 28 July for the invasion landings at Palermo, screening the cruiser Philadelphia to provide fire support to the Army landing forces, and then swept from Palermo to Cape Milazzo hunting Axis shipping between 31 July and 1 August. Cowie returned to Oran 4 August and cleared for New York 8 days later, arriving 22 August.

After escorting a convoy to Belfast, Northern Ireland between 5 and 30 September 1943, Cowie was overhauled at New York before returning to convoy escort duty. She made 18 transatlantic voyages to United Kingdom and Mediterranean ports until 5 May 1945, when she entered Boston Navy Yard for conversion to a high-speed minesweeper; Cowie was reclassified DMS-39 on 30 May 1945.

Sailing from Boston 24 June 1945, Cowie joined in minesweeping exercises at Norfolk until 18 July when she departed for San Diego, arriving 3 August. Following the cessation of hostilities, she sailed from San Diego 29 August for Okinawa, arriving 27 September. Sweeping mines in the Yellow Sea and off Kobe and Wakayama, Japan, Cowie remained in the Far East until 25 March 1946 when she departed Yokosuka for San Francisco, arriving 11 April 1946. Cowie was placed out of commission in reserve 21 April 1947, berthed at San Diego. She was reclassified DD-632, 15 July 1955. Cowie was stricken from the naval register on 1 December 1970 and sold 22 February 1972 and broken up for scrap.

Cowie received three battle stars for World War II service.
