= John Dowie =

John Dowie may refer to:

- John Alexander Dowie (1847–1907), Scottish clergyman who founded Zion, Illinois
- John Dowie (artist) (1915–2008), Australian sculptor and painter
- John Dowie (footballer) (1955–2016), Scottish footballer
- John Dowie (humourist) (born 1950), English comedian, musician and writer
- John Dowie (d.1817) owner of the infamous John Dowie's Tavern in Edinburgh
