= Cowie Castle =

Ruined fortress in Aberdeenshire, Scotland

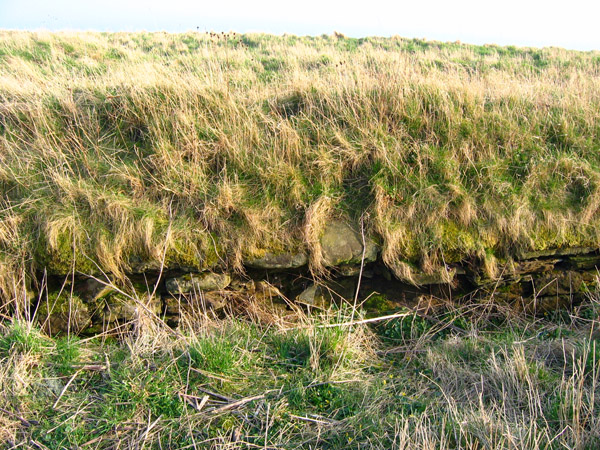
- Remains of Cowie Castle
- Coordinates: 56.9753°N 2.193°W

Scheduled monument
- Official name: Castle of Cowie
- Type: Secular: castle
- Designated: 13 June 2001
- Reference no.: SM9742

Cowie Castle is a ruined fortress in Aberdeenshire, Scotland. The site lies at the northern end of Stonehaven on the North Sea coast. To the immediate south is the Cowie Bridge crossing of the Cowie Water. Evidence of prehistoric man exists in the vicinity dating to the Iron Age in the form of ring cairns.

== Strategic location ==
The ancient Causey Mounth trackway was developed at least as early as the eleventh century AD to connect the coastal portion of Stonehaven to a crossing of the River Dee at the southern edge of Aberdeen. This strategic route in the Middle Ages fit with the coastal defences of the fortresses of Dunnottar Castle and Cowie Castle, controlling land and sea movements of military units. Cowie Castle at the north of Stonehaven effectively controlled all coastal land and sea movements to the north. Proceeding north from Cowie Castle, the Causey Mounth crosses the Burn of Muchalls at the Bridge of Muchalls and thence proceeds northward past Muchalls Castle. The trackway passes the ruins of the Episcopal Chapels, dating to 1624 situated on the lands of the Muchalls Castle Estate, and thence northerly crossing through the boggy Portlethen Moss (which had a much larger historic extent than present). Cowie Castle is also situated near the southern end of the Elsick Mounth, another strategic route used by the Romans in their northern invasion and also instrumental in subsequent eras' military movements.

Other nearby castles are the ruined Dunnottar Castle to the south, Fetteresso Castle to the south-west and Muchalls Castle to the north. St. Nathalan is said to have founded the ruined Chapel of St. Mary and St. Nathalan immediately north of the Cowie Castle site.

== The castle ==
Cowie is thought to have been the site of a royal hunting lodge in the Middle Ages, and may have served as a royal lodging during progresses through the north-east of Scotland. Only a small section of masonry survives today on the site, which is a scheduled monument.

== See also ==
- Barony of Cowie
- Cowie Village
- Fiddes Castle
