= Patience Cowie =

British geologist

- Born: January 27, 1964
- Died: April 7, 2020 (aged 56)
- Education: University of Durham; Columbia University
- Scientific career
- Workplaces: University of Edinburgh; University of Nice Sophia Antipolis; University of Bergen

Patience Anne Cowie (27 January 1964 – 7 April 2020) was a Professor of Earth System Dynamics at the University of Bergen. Her research has considered fault propagation and rift basins. She was awarded the 2016 Geological Society of London Coke medal.

== Early life and education ==
Cowie was born in the United Kingdom. She studied geology at Durham University and graduated in 1985. During her undergraduate degree she took part in field trips and became more interested in geological research. Cowie moved to the Lamont–Doherty Earth Observatory at Columbia University for her graduate studies and earned master's degree in 1989. She remained there for her doctoral degree and completed her PhD under the supervision of Christopher Scholz in 1992. She moved to the University of Nice Sophia Antipolis as a postdoctoral research fellow in 1992, where she spent one year before joining the University of Edinburgh.

== Research and career ==
Cowie moved to the University of Edinburgh in 1993, initially supported by a Natural Environment Research Council research fellowship. She was awarded a Royal Society University Research Fellowship in 1994. Her research considers the surface process responses to active faulting. These include studying the physical laws responsible for river erosion, how sediment is dispersed in rift basins and developing field testing models using source-to-sink approaches. She uses a range of research approaches, including data collected during field visits, theoretical and mathematical models. This includes the use of Lidar and ground-penetrating radar to monitor seismic slip. In 2003, Cowie was made an adjunct researcher at the Woods Hole Oceanographic Institution. She was promoted to Professor of Geodynamics at the University of Edinburgh in 2008.

In 2011, Cowie joined the University of Bergen as a Professor of Geodynamics. Here she is co-leader of the Statoil-Norwegian Multi-Rift Project. Cowie has intensively investigated geological faults. She has studied the way that faults propagate, the variations in space and time due to the interactions of faults, the rates at which they slip and how damage zones develop in high porosity sandstones. Her recent work has considered the geomorphology of the Apennine Mountains in Italy and mainland Greece. Alongside work on geological faults, she has studied subsidence in rift basins, rates of erosion and how sediment is routed across rift basins. She has studied the evaluation of Late Jurassic rifting in the North Sea. She co-leads MultiRift, a Research Council of Norway program that uses surface process modelling. Cowie has investigated the origins of earthquakes, and was the first to identify that fault zones deform the same way predicted by experiments in laboratories.

The Geological Society of London recognised the contributions that Cowie has made to geology in 2016 and awarded her the Coke medal. The citation read, "Patience Cowie's research career has been outstanding from its outset: her seminal PhD work, carried out with Chris Scholz at the Lamont–Doherty Earth Observatory, produced novel insights into the way faults grow and interact, and explained the physical mechanisms behind fault linkage and the reason why fault displacement-length scaling occurs in natural systems... Patience's research is characterised by deep clarity of thought, and represents a judicious combination of numerical modelling, seismic analysis and field observation... Patience Cowie, you are an inspirational and far-sighted geoscientist, who has revolutionized our understanding of the growth and interaction of faults".

=== Selected publications ===
Her publications include:

- Cowie, Patience; Berkowitz, Brian (2001). "Scaling of fracture systems in geological media" (PDF). Reviews of Geophysics. 39 (3): 347–383. Bibcode:2001RvGeo..39..347B. doi:10.1029/1999RG000074. hdl:20.500.11820/f2c6994d-c857-466d-ae08-6f7b85782295. S2CID 53495936.
- Cowie, Patience; Scholz, Christopher H. (1 November 1992). "Physical explanation for the displacement-length relationship of faults using a post-yield fracture mechanics model". Journal of Structural Geology. 14 (10): 1133–1148. Bibcode:1992JSG....14.1133C. doi:10.1016/0191-8141(92)90065-5.
- Cowie, Patience; Scholz, Christopher H. (1 November 1992). "Displacement-length scaling relationship for faults: data synthesis and discussion". Journal of Structural Geology. 14 (10): 1149–1156. Bibcode:1992JSG....14.1149C. doi:10.1016/0191-8141(92)90066-6.

She has served as the editor of the Geological Society of America journal Geology.

== Personal life ==
Cowie was married with two daughters, Esther and Saskia. Her husband, Leo Zijerveld took a career break during their childhood, completing a degree at the Open University. She was diagnosed with breast cancer in 2008.
