= Cowie Water =

River in Kincardineshire and Aberdeenshire, Scotland

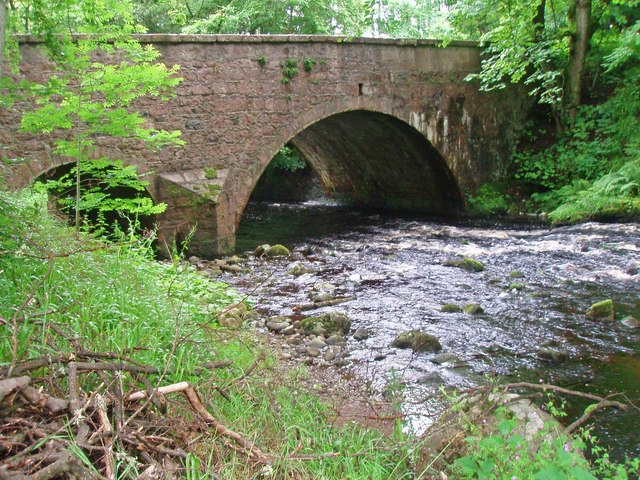
- Cowie Water, looking downstream at the A957 road bridge
- Native name: Uisge Chollaidh (Scottish Gaelic)

Location
- Country: Scotland

Physical characteristics
- Source: Grampian Mountains
- Mouth: North Sea
  - location: Stonehaven, Scotland
  - coordinates: 56.96691°N 2.20667°W

The Cowie Water (Scottish Gaelic: Uisge Chollaidh) is a river of Scotland.

== Geography ==
The river rises in the Grampian Mountains in Kincardineshire, and discharges to the North Sea in the northern part of Stonehaven, south of the ruined Cowie Castle. Tributaries of the Cowie Water include the Burn of Monboys, which drains the area to the north, in which the archaeological site Raedykes Roman Camp is situated; and Cowton Burn.

Notable features in this vicinity include Dunnottar Castle, Fetteresso Castle and Muchalls Castle. Other nearby coastal waterways discharging to the North Sea include Burn of Muchalls to the north and Carron Water to the south.

== Hydrology and water quality ==
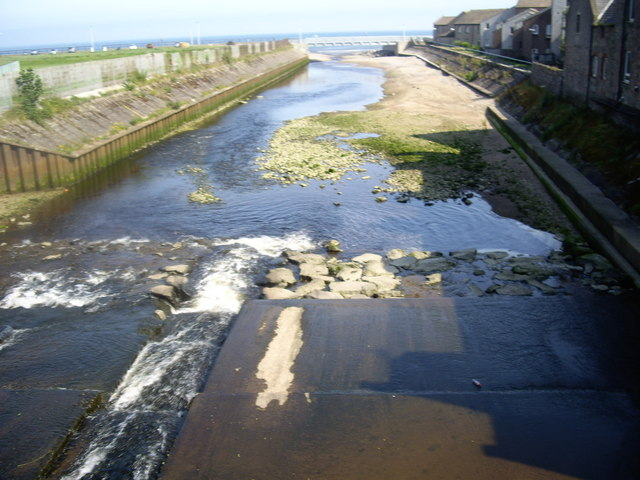
The Cowie Water close to its mouth

Summer flow rates are typically in the range of 200 cubic feet per second (5.7 m^{3}/s) at the river's mouth. July values for pH have been measured at 8.2 or slightly alkaline July water temperatures are about 11.9 degrees Celsius and electrical conductivity at Cowie Bridge near the mouth has been measured at a relatively low value of .07 micro-Siemens per meter. Turbidity measured exactly 24 hours after a moderate rainfall of one centimeter was 14 JTU in a July circumstance.

== See also ==
- Barony of Cowie
- Ury House

== Line notes ==
Media related to Cowie Water at Wikimedia Commons
