= Cowie, Aberdeenshire =

Fishing village in Kincardineshire, Scotland

Coordinates: 56°58′16.95″N 2°12′9″W

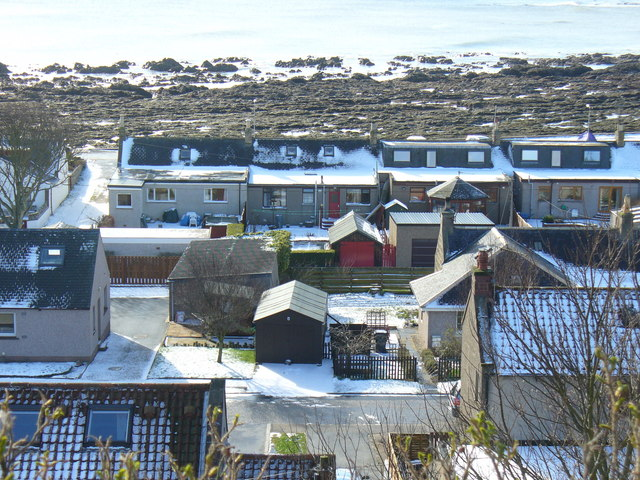

Cowie is an historic fishing village in Kincardineshire, Scotland. This village has existed since the Middle Ages, but in current times it is effectively subsumed into the town of Stonehaven. It had an estimated population of 2,720 in 2020.

== History ==
William Camden recorded the existence of Cowie in 1596 in his historical writings. (Watt, 1985) Notable historic features in the vicinity include Cowie Castle (now ruined), Chapel of St. Mary and St. Nathalan (now ruined), the Stonehaven Tolbooth, Muchalls Castle and Fetteresso Castle. Cowie Village was situated at the southern end of the ancient Causey Mounth trackway, which road was constructed on high ground to make passable this only available medieval route from coastal points south from Stonehaven to Aberdeen. This ancient passage specifically connected the River Dee crossing (where the present Bridge of Dee is situated) via Portlethen Moss, Muchalls Castle and Cowie Castle to the south. (Hogan, 2007) The route was that taken by William Keith, 7th Earl Marischal and the Marquess of Montrose when they led a Covenanter army of 9000 men in the battle of the Civil War in 1639. (Watt, 1985)

== Fishing ==
The Annual Reports of the Fishery Board for Scotland provide an insight into the fishing in Cowie in the years before the First World War. The report for 1900 describes Cowie as "a small village near Stonehaven. Nearly all the fish caught by the fishermen here are landed at Stonehaven and included in the returns for that place." The presence of a curing station from 1909 to 1911 correlates with the increase in local landings, but also with the reduce number of boats and fishermen.

Fishery Statistics

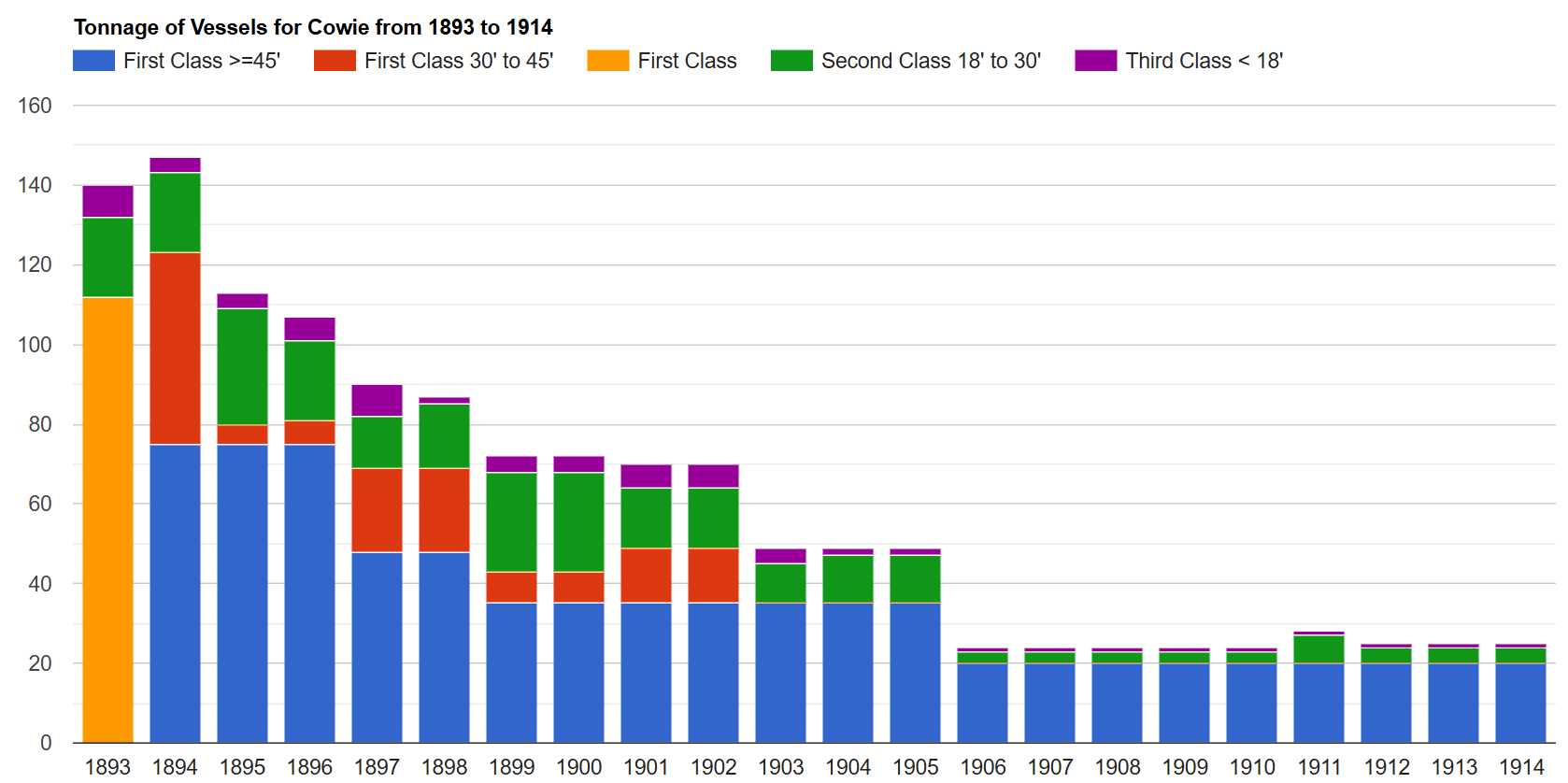
Tonnage of vessels

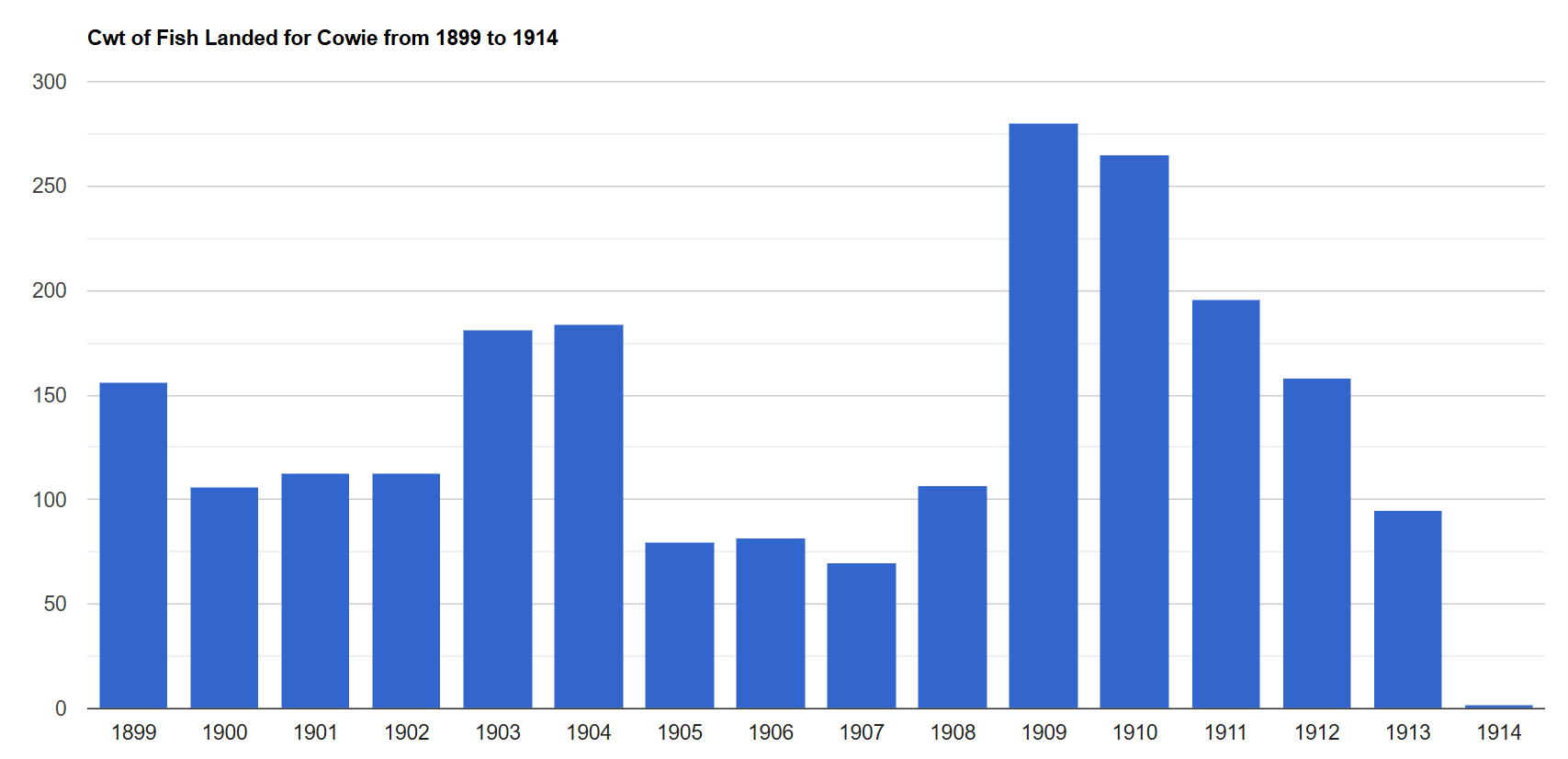
Cwt of fish landed

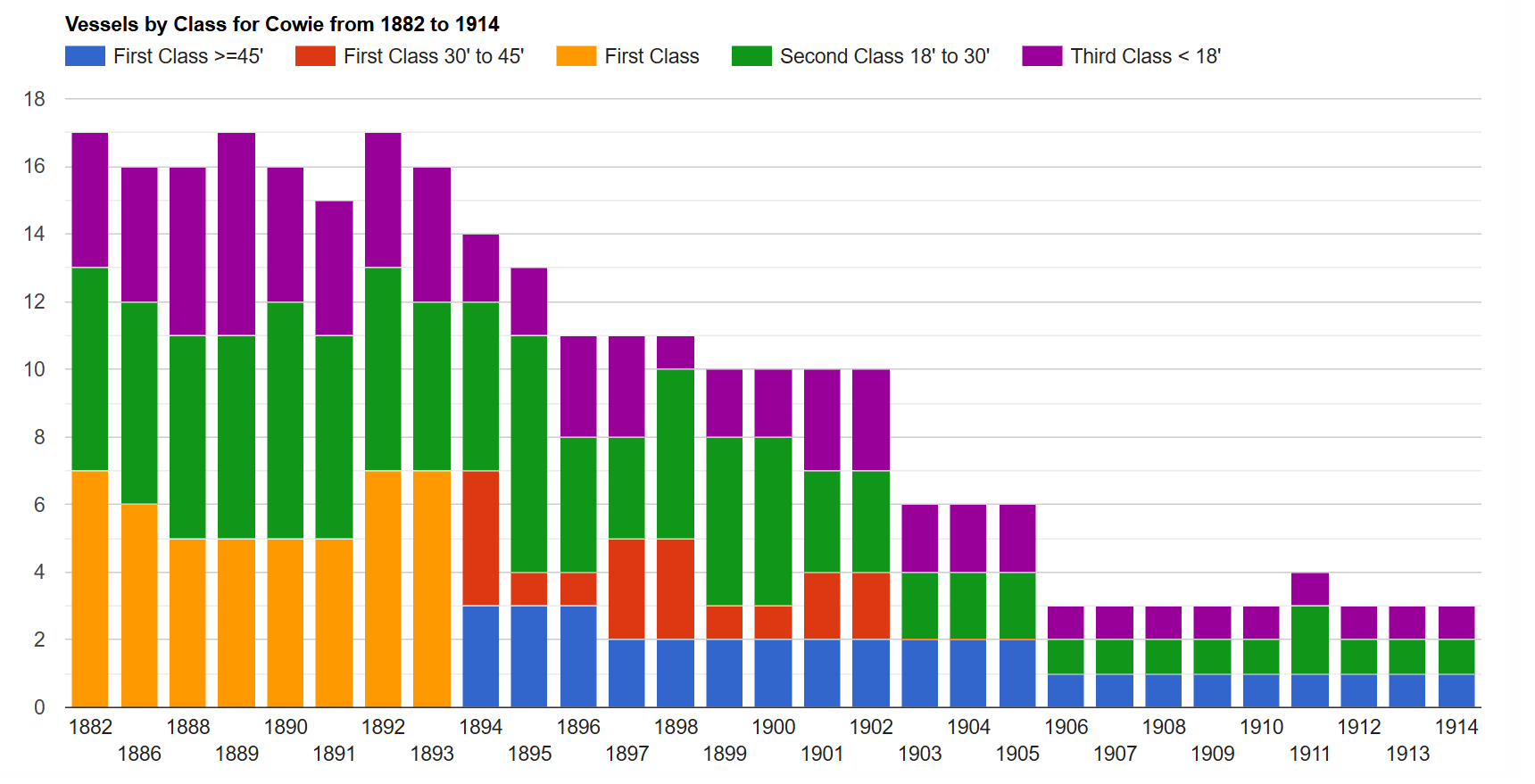
Vessels by class

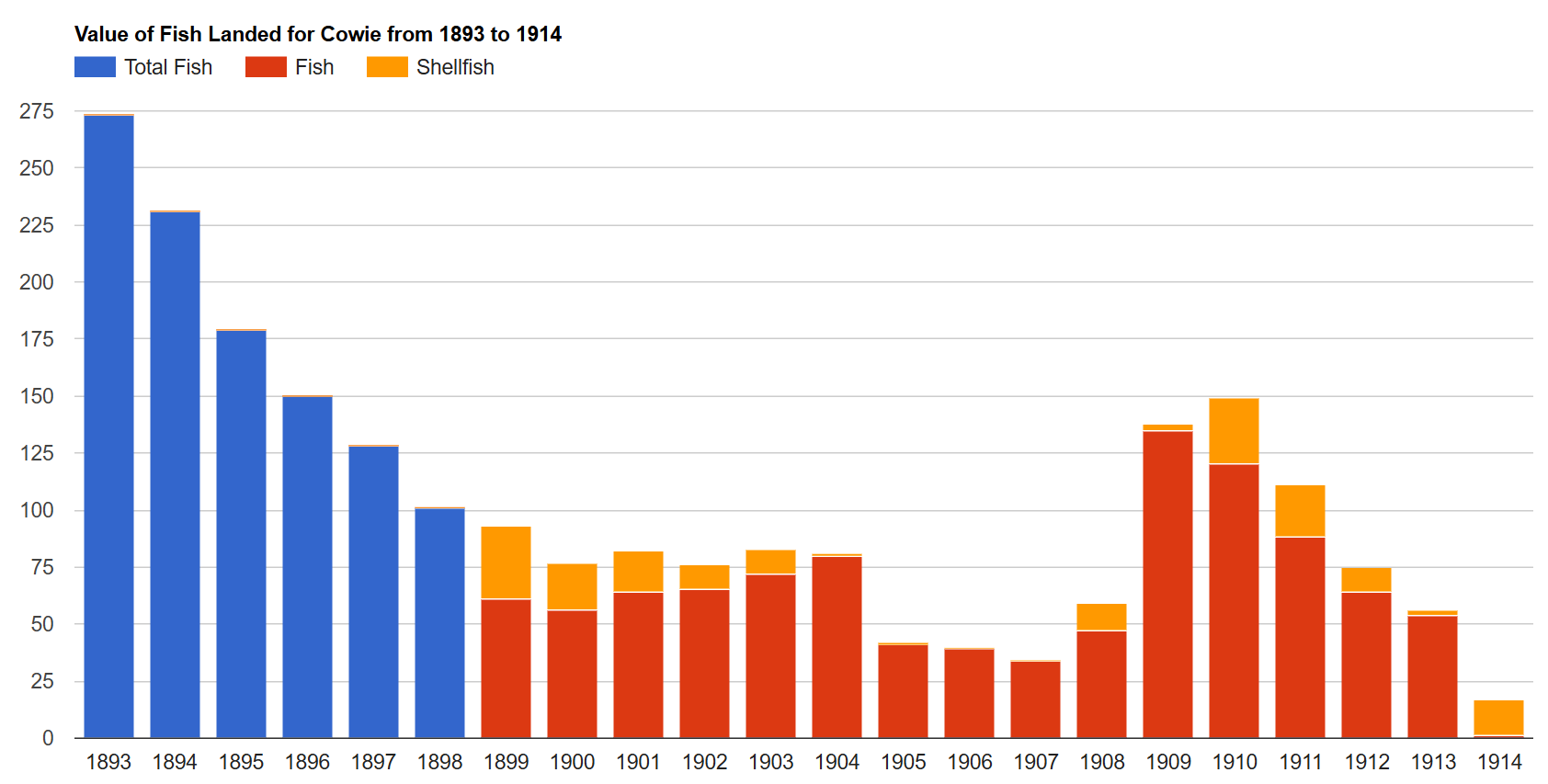
Value (£) of fish landed

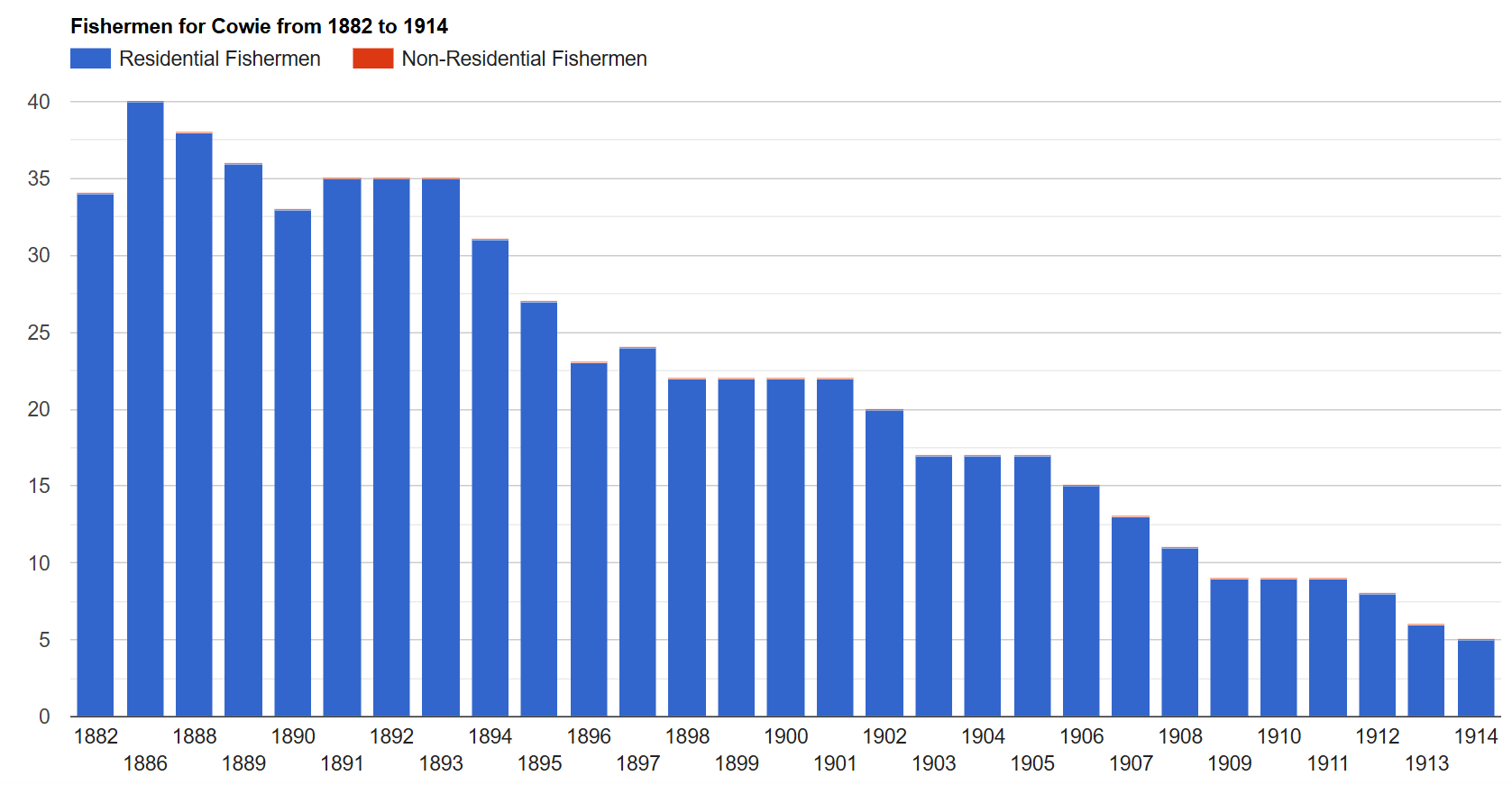
Fishermen

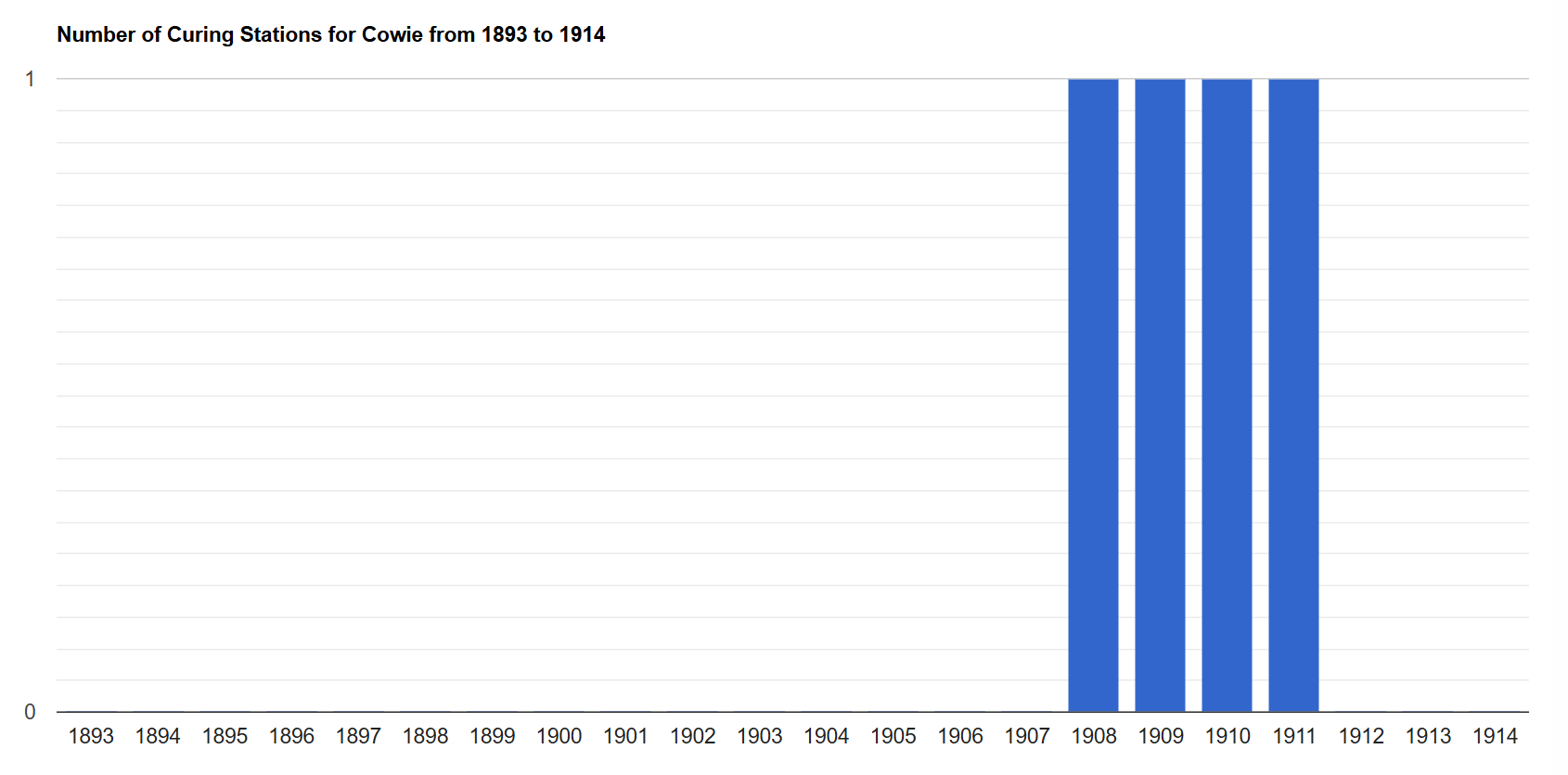
Placeholder - no curing stations

== Birthplace of air breathing life ==
The foreshore near Cowie Harbour was the finding place of Pneumodesmus newmani, the oldest fossil of an air-breathing land organism Pneumodesmus.

== See also ==
- Barony of Cowie
- Cowie Castle
- Morthouse
