= Helen Cowie (historian) =

British historian (born 1981)

External audio
- Episode 208: Victims of Fashion with Helen Cowie; Helen Cowie discusses Victims of Fashion on the podcast Knowing Animals

Helen Louise Cowie (born 1981) is a British historian who is a Professor of Early Modern History at the University of York. Her research addresses cultural history, the history of science, animal history, and the history of Latin America.

== Career ==
Cowie read for a PhD in history at the University of Warwick, where she was supervised by Anthony McFarlane and Rebecca Earle. Her thesis, which was submitted in 2007, was entitled Colonizing science: Nature and Nations in the Spanish World, c.1750-1850. A revised version of Cowie's thesis was published with Manchester University Press in 2011, entitled Conquering Nature in Spain and Its Empire, 1750-1850. In the book, Cowie explores the study of natural history in the Spanish Empire in the 18th and 19th century. Cowie joined the Department of History at the University of York in 2011 as a Lecturer, later becoming a Senior Lecturer then Professor.

Cowie published Exhibiting Animals in Nineteenth-Century Britain with Palgrave Macmillan in 2014 and Victims of Fashion with Cambridge University Press in 2021. In the former book, Cowie explores the social history of British zoos and travelling menageries in the 19th century. In the latter, Cowie explores the use of animal products in 19th century Britain, including feathers, furs, and ivory.

== Select bibliography ==
- Cowie, Helen (2011). Conquering Nature in Spain and Its Empire, 1750-1850. Manchester University Press.
- Cowie, Helen (2014). Exhibiting Animals in Nineteenth-Century Britain: Empathy, Education, Entertainment. Palgrave Macmillan.
- Cowie, Helen (2017). Llama. Reaktion Books.
- Cowie, Helen (2021). Victims of Fashion: Animal Commodities in Victorian Britain. Cambridge University Press.
