= Education and Urban Society =

- Discipline: Education
- Language: English
- Edited by: Charles J. Russo

Publication details
- History: 1968-present
- Publisher: SAGE Publications
- Frequency: Bimonthly
- Impact factor: 1.104 (2019)

Standard abbreviations
- ISO 4: Educ. Urban Soc.

Indexing
- ISSN: 0013-1245 (print); 1552-3535 (web)
- LCCN: 75003541
- OCLC no.: 1567533

Links
- Journal homepage; Online access; Online archive

Education and Urban Society is a bimonthly peer-reviewed academic journal that covers research on the role of education in contemporary society. The editor-in-chief is Charles J. Russo (University of Dayton). It was established in 1968 and is published by SAGE Publications.

== Abstracting and indexing ==
The journal is abstracted and indexed in Scopus and the Social Sciences Citation Index. According to the Journal Citation Reports, its 2019 impact factor is 1.104, ranking it 202 out of 262 journals in the category "Education and Educational Research" and 36 out of 42 journals in the category "Urban Studies"
