= List of shipwrecks in April 1833 =

The list of shipwrecks in April 1833 includes some ships sunk, foundered, grounded, or otherwise lost during April 1833.

== 1 April ==
List of shipwrecks: 1 April 1833
Ship	State	Description
Caldecot Castle	United Kingdom	The ship was driven ashore and wrecked near Aldeburgh, Suffolk. She was on a voyage from Newcastle upon Tyne, Northumberland to London.
Huddersfield	United Kingdom	The ship tan aground on the Rose Sand, in the North Sea off Saltfleet, Lincolnshire. Her crew were rescued. She broke up on 6 April. Huddersfield was on a voyage from Hull, Yorkshire to London.
Opsrey	United Kingdom	The ship was wrecked on the North Rock, Dorset. Her crew were rescued. She was on a voyage from Newry, County Down to London.

== 2 April ==
List of shipwrecks: 2 April 1833
Ship	State	Description
Hope	United Kingdom	The barque was driven ashore on the coast of Alabama, United States.
Eugen	Prussia	The ship was driven ashore and wrecked at Memel. She was on a voyage from Danzig to Memel.

== 4 April ==
List of shipwrecks: 4 April 1833
Ship	State	Description
Anacreon	United Kingdom	The ship was driven ashore and wrecked on Hogg Island, Virginia, United States. She was on a voyage from Liverpool, Lancashire to Virginia.

== 5 April ==
List of shipwrecks: 5 April 1833
Ship	State	Description
Caledonia	United Kingdom	The ship was holed by her anchor and sank at Troon, Ayrshire.
Palm	United Kingdom	The ship was driven ashore and damageded on Scharhörn. Her crew were rescued. She was on a voyage from Saint Thomas, Virgin Islands to Hamburg. Palm was refloated on 10 April and taken in to Cuxhaven.

== 8 April ==
List of shipwrecks: 8 April 1833
Ship	State	Description
John and Mary	United Kingdom	The cutter was wrecked on Inistrahull Island, County Donegal. Her five crew were rescued.

== 10 April ==
List of shipwrecks: 10 April 1833
Ship	State	Description
President	United Kingdom	The ship was wrecked on the Arklow Banks, in the Irish Sea. Her crew were rescued. She was on a voyage from Alicante, Spain to Londonderry.

== 11 April ==
List of shipwrecks: 11 April 1833
Ship	State	Description
John	(United Kingdom of Great Britain and Ireland) Jersey	The ship was wrecked at Seaford, Sussex. Her crew were rescued by HMRC Stork ( Board of Customs).
Providence	United Kingdom	The ship was iun collision with Swift (United Kingdom and sank in the North Sea off Scarborough, Yorkshire. Her crew were rescued.

== 14 April ==
List of shipwrecks: 14 April 1833
Ship	State	Description
Rifleman	United Kingdom	The ship departed from Hobart, Van Diemen's Land for London. No further trace, presumed foundered with the loss of all hands. She may have been wrecked in the Auckland Islands, New Zealand.
Waterloo	United Kingdom	The ship was sunk by ice in the Grand Banks of Newfoundland. Her crew were rescued. She was on a voyage from Newcastle upon Tyne, Northumberland to British North America.

=== 20 April ===
List of shipwrecks: 20 April 1833
Ship	State	Description
Crown	United Kingdom	The ship was lost in the Grand Banks of Newfoundland. Her crew were rescued. She was on a voyage from London to Quebec City, Lower Canada, British North America.

== 21 April ==
List of shipwrecks: 21 April 1833
Ship	State	Description
Anna	(United Kingdom of Great Britain and Ireland) Grenada	The drogher was lost at Grenada.

== 22 April ==
List of shipwrecks: 22 April 1833
Ship	State	Description
Dolphin	(United Kingdom of Great Britain and Ireland) British North America	The ship was wrecked near Portugal Cove, Nova Scotia.. She was on a voyage from Halifax to Portugal Cove.
Friendship	United Kingdom	The ship was wrecked near Thisted, Denmark. Her crew were rescued. She was on a voyage from Aberdeen to Riga, Russia.

== 24 April ==
List of shipwrecks: 24 April 1833
Ship	State	Description
Melpomene	United Kingdom	The ship was wrecked in the Atlantic Ocean. She was abandoned three days later. Her crew were rescued by Isabella (United Kingdom). Melpomene was on a voyage from the Clyde to Quebec City, Lower Canada, British North America.
Nymph	(United Kingdom of Great Britain and Ireland) British North America	The ship departed from Petty Harbour, Newfoundland Colony, for a Portuguese port. No further trace, presumed foundered in the Atlantic Ocean with the loss of all hands.

== 25 April ==
List of shipwrecks: 25 April 1833
Ship	State	Description
Anne	United Kingdom	The ship was wrecked in the River Severn. Her crew were rescued. She was on a voyage from Sydney to an Irish port.

== 26 April ==
List of shipwrecks: 26 April 1833
Ship	State	Description
Margaret	United Kingdom	The ship was wrecked in Caernarvon Bay. Her crew were rescued. She was on a voyage from Cardiff, Glamorgan to Preston, Lancashire.
Mary Ann	United States	The ship was destroyed by fire about 55 leagues (165 nautical miles (306 km) off St. Jago de Cuba, Cuba with some loss of life. She was on a voyage from New York to the South Seas.
Olive	United Kingdom	The ship capsized in the Bight of Benin with the loss of a crew member.

== 28 April ==
List of shipwrecks: 28 April 1833
Ship	State	Description
America	United States	The schooner was wrecked on Georges Island, in Boston Harbor.

== 29 April ==
List of shipwrecks: 29 April 1833
Ship	State	Description
Comtesse de Bouille	France	The ship was wrecked at Saint-Pierre, Martinique.
Joven Miguel	Spain	The ship was lost off Crooked Island, Bahamas. She was on a voyage from St. Andero to Havana, Cuba.

== Unknown date ==
List of shipwrecks: Unknown date 1833
Ship	State	Description
Heroina	Portugal	The schooner was wrecked off Old Harbour, Jamaica. Two hundred and thirty-two slaves were rescued.
Highlander	United Kingdom	The ship was driven ashore at "Holyhaven", Essex.
Liberty	United Kingdom	The ship was abandoned before 3 April and was subsequently driven ashore on Colonsay, Inner Hebrides. She was on a voyage from Liverpool, Lancashire to Newcastle upon Tyne, Northumberland.
Johanna	United States	The ship was lost whilst on a voyage from Virginia to Grenada.
Mexico	Mexico	The ship departed from Tampico for New Orleans, Louisiana, United States. Her crew subsequently mutinied, murdered her captain and passengers, then scuttled the vessel off Cape San Antonio, Cuba.
Olive Branch	(United Kingdom of Great Britain and Ireland) British North America	The schooner capsized in late April.
Robert	(United Kingdom of Great Britain and Ireland) British North America	The ship was wrecked in late April.
Selina	(United Kingdom of Great Britain and Ireland) British North America	The ship was abandoned at sea in late April.
Sir Charles Price	United Kingdom	The whaler was wrecked in the Society Islands. Her crew were rescued. She was on a voyage from the South Seas to London.
Three Friends	United Kingdom	The ship was lost near Tampico, Mexico in late April. She was on a voyage from Gibraltar to Tampico.
Triune	United Kingdom	The ship was wrecked near Viana de Castelano, Portugal with the loss of all hands. She was on a voyage from Liverpool, Lancashire to Gibraltar.
Tweed	United Kingdom	The ship was wrecked on the Heneaga Reef before 26 April. She was on a voyage from Jamaica to Halifax, Nova Scotia, British North America.
