= List of shipwrecks in April 1888 =

The list of shipwrecks in April 1888 includes ships sunk, foundered, grounded, or otherwise lost during April 1888.

== 1 April ==
List of shipwrecks: 1 April 1888
Ship	State	Description
Mercur	Germany	The barque collided with the barque Choice (United Kingdom) and sank in the Bristol Channel off Nash Point, Glamorgan, United Kingdom. Her crew were rescued bhy Choice. Mercur was on a voyage from Newport, Monmouthshire, United Kingdom to the River Plate.

== 4 April ==
List of shipwrecks: 4 April 1888
Ship	State	Description
Bull	United Kingdom	The steamship collided with the steamship Sunrise (United Kingdom) in the River Carron and was severely damaged. She put in to Middlesbrough, Yorkshire.

== 5 April ==
List of shipwrecks: 5 April 1888
Ship	State	Description
Portia, and Times	Germany; United Kingdom	The steamships collided in the River Thames at Limehouse, Middlesex and were both severely damaged.

== 6 April ==
List of shipwrecks: 6 April 1888
Ship	State	Description
Eskdale	United Kingdom	The steamship ran aground in the River Tees. She was on a voyage from Bilbao, Spain to Middlesbrough, Yorkshire.

== 7 April ==
List of shipwrecks: 7 April 1888
Ship	State	Description
De Svende Broders Minde	Norway	The schooner was discovered in a capsized condition 29 nautical miles (54 km) off Peterhead, Aberdeenshire, United Kingdom. She was towed in to Peterhead by Rapid and the tug Pride of Scotland (both United Kingdom).

== 9 April ==
List of shipwrecks: 9 April 1888
Ship	State	Description
Julius	United Kingdom	The barque foundered in the Bay of Biscay. Her nine crew took to the boats; they were rescued the next day by the barque Otago (United Kingdom).

== 11 April ==
List of shipwrecks: 11 April 1888
Ship	State	Description
Alfen	Norway	The schooner was driven ashore at Wookhead, Orkney Islands, United Kingdom.
Greenwood	United Kingdom	The steamship was run into by the tug William Grey (United Kingdom) at Stockton-on-Tees, County Durham and was severely damaged.
Hearts of Oak	United Kingdom	The Thames barge was run into by the steamship Widgeon (United Kingdom) and sank at Woolwich, Kent.
Ouse Hopper No. 4, and Verlandi	United Kingdom; Sweden	The steamship Verlandi ran into the hopper barge Ouse Hopper No. 4 in the River Tees. Both vessels were severely damaged. Verlandi was on a voyage from Middlesbrough, Yorkshire to Gothenburg. She put back to Middlesbrough.

== 12 April ==
List of shipwrecks: 12 April 1888
Ship	State	Description
Einar	Norway	The barque was driven ashore and broke her back at Crail, Fife, United Kingdom. She was on a voyage from Christiania to Bo'ness, Lothian, United Kingdom.
Express	United Kingdom	The fishing boat was wrecked on Shapinsay, Orkney Islands with the loss of a crew member.

== 13 April ==
List of shipwrecks: 13 April 1888
Ship	State	Description
Norma		The barque sank following a collision with the steamer Bremen, which put into Dover the following day.
Yorouba	France	The ship struck a rock and sank 2 nautical miles (3.7 km) west of Guernsey, Channel Islands and 7 nautical miles (13 km) from Les Hanois Lighthouse. All on board were rescued. She was on a voyage from Guernsey to Havre de Grâce, Seine-Inférieure.

== 14 April ==
List of shipwrecks: 14 April 1888
Ship	State	Description
New Bedford	United States	The steamship was crushed by ice and foundered off "Santos", Newfoundland Colony with the loss of 27 of her 45 crew.
Pelle	Sweden	The barque sprang a leak and foundered in the Mediterranean Sea 80 nautical miles (150 km) east of Europa Point, Gibraltar. Her crew were rescued by the steamship River Avon (United Kingdom).

== 16 April ==
List of shipwrecks: 16 April 1888
Ship	State	Description
Henry James	United Kingdom	The barque was wrecked on a reef 35 nautical miles (65 km) off Palmyra Island. All on board reached the island, from where they were rescued on 29 May by the steamship Arizona (United Kingdom). Henry James was on a voyage from Newcastle, New South Wales to San Francisco, California, United States.
Vena	Belgium	The steamship sank in the North Sea following a collision with another ship.

== 17 April ==
List of shipwrecks: 17 April 1888
Ship	State	Description
Diadem	United Kingdom	The schooner collided with the steamship Cyrus (United Kingdom) and sank in the River Tyne. Her crew were rescued. Diadem was on a voyage from Runcorn, Cheshire to the River Tyne.

== 19 April ==
List of shipwrecks: 19 April 1888
Ship	State	Description
Allemannia	Germany	The ship departed from Rio de Janeiro, Brazil for Port Elizabeth, Cape Colony. No further trace, reported missing.

== 22 April ==
List of shipwrecks: 22 April 1888
Ship	State	Description
Fairholme	United Kingdom	The barque was destroyed by fire 60 nautical miles (110 km) south of Cape Agulhas, Cape Colony. She was on a voyage from Calcutta, India to New York, United States.

== 23 April ==
List of shipwrecks: 23 April 1888
Ship	State	Description
Paddy Murphy	United States	The tug caught fire, burned to the waterline and sank in Dover Bay in Lake Erie.

== 24 April ==
List of shipwrecks: 24 April 1888
Ship	State	Description
Margaret	United Kingdom	The schooner, bound for Penzance, Cornwall from Rotterdam with a cargo of straw, sank shortly after a collision with the steamship Risca in the North Sea.
Mercur	Norway	The barque was wrecked on the Longsand, in the North Sea off the coast of Essex, United Kingdom. Her crew were rescued by a French fishing boat.
San Pablo	United Kingdom	The steamship was attacked by Chinese pirates. She was set afire and driven ashore at "Turnabout", in the Formosa Channel. Her crew were rescued. She was a total loss.

== 25 April ==
List of shipwrecks: 25 April 1888
Ship	State	Description
Ann Noble	United Kingdom	The corvette Châteaurenault (French Navy) collided with the schooner Elizabeth at Leith, Lothian. The fishing boat Ann Noble was crushed between Elizabeth and the quayside and sank.
Osman Pasha	United Kingdom	The fishing vessel collided with the fishing smack Apostle (United Kingdom) and sank in the North Sea. Her crew were rescued by the fishing smack Granville (United Kingdom).

== 27 April ==
List of shipwrecks: 27 April 1888
Ship	State	Description
Alert	United Kingdom	The fishing vessel was run into by HMS Buzzard (Royal Navy) and sank at Sheerness, Kent. Her crew were rescued by HMS Buzzard.
Ellengowan	United Kingdom	The unmanned steamship sank at her moorings at Port Darwin, South Australia, and was abandoned.
Julia Foard	United States	The barque was wrecked in the Karluk River on Kodiak Island, District of Alaska. All seventeen people on board survived.

== 28 April ==
List of shipwrecks: 28 April 1888
Ship	State	Description
Smyrna	United Kingdom	The ship collided with the steamship Moto (United Kingdom) and sank in the English Channel 16 nautical miles (30 km) south east of Anvil Point, Dorset with the loss of twelve of her 30 crew. Survivors were rescued by Moto. Smyrna was on a voyage from London to Sydney, New South Wales.
Tiverton	United Kingdom	The steamship ran aground on the East Manse Rock. She was on a voyage from Brunswick, Georgia, United States to Liverpool, Lancashire. She was refloated and take in to Liverpool in a severely leaky condition.

== 29 April ==
List of shipwrecks: 29 April 1888
Ship	State	Description
Royal Sailor	United Kingdom	The tug collided with the barque Ariel (Norway) and sank in the Bristol Channel off Ilfracombe, Devon. Her crew were rescued by the tug Britannia (United Kingdom).

== Unknown date ==
List of shipwrecks: Unknown date in April 1888
Ship	State	Description
Ada	United Kingdom	The smack collided with the smack Gamma (United Kingdom) and sank in the North Sea with the loss of a crew member.
Alice Montgomery	United States	The barque foundered in the Atlantic Ocean. Her crew were rescued. She was on a voyage from Norfolk, Virginia to Providence, Rhode Island.
Ashington	United Kingdom	The ship was driven ashore at Hong Kong. She was later refloated.
Biene	Flag unknown	The steamship was driven ashore on Saltholmen, Denmark. She was refloated with assistance and taken in to Copenhagen, Denmark.
Castle Rising	United Kingdom	The steamship ran aground on the Falsterbo Reef, in the Baltic Sea. She was on a voyage from Huelva, Spain to Stettin, Germany. She was refloated and towed in to Copenhagen.
Clara	United Kingdom	The schooner foundered in the English Channel on or before 4 April. Her crew were rescued by the barque Alfred (France).
Continental	United States	The ship was driven ashore at Point Palmyras, India. Her crew survived. She was on a voyage from New York to Calcutta, India.
Delma C.	United Kingdom	The brigantine was wrecked on Barbuda.
Dispatch	United Kingdom	The ketch ran aground on the Haisborough Sands, in the North Sea off the coast of Norfolk. She was on a voyage from Hull, Yorkshire to King's Lynn, Norfolk. She was refloated and taken in to Great Yarmouth, Norfolk in a leaky condition.
Ebor	United Kingdom	The steamship ran aground in the Guadalquivir and was damaged. She was on a voyage from Seville, Spain to Cherbourg, Manche, France. She was refloated and put back to Seville. She was subsequently taken in to Cádiz for repairs.
Ethel	United Kingdom	The schooner was driven ashore 1 nautical mile (1.9 km) from Londonderry.
Eugene Krohn	Germany	The steamship was driven ashore on Langeland, Denmark. She was on a voyage from Rostock to Rotterdam, South Holland, Netherlands.
Flora	United States	The ship was driven ashore on Castle Island, New York. She was on a voyage from Guantanamo, Cuba to New York. She was refloated.
Foussingo	United Kingdom	The ship was wrecked in the Bahamas. She was on a voyage from Maracaibo, Venezuela to Falmouth, Cornwall.
Gauntlet	United Kingdom	The schooner ran aground on the Platters Rocks, off the coast of Anglesey. She was on a voyage from Penmon, Anglesey to London. She was refloated and taken in to Holyhead, Anglesey in a leaky condition.
General Gordon	United Kingdom	The steamship ran aground on the west coast of Tenedos, Ottoman Empire.
German Emperor	United Kingdom	The steamship collided with the steamship Newnham (United Kingdom) in the River Thames at Northfleet, Kent and was severely damaged. She was beached at Tilburyness, Essex.
Gitana	United Kingdom	The schooner was driven ashore at Fowey, Cornwall. She subsequently became a wreck.
Glenburn	Flag unknown	The ship caught fire at New YorkNew York. She was on a voyage from Calcutta to New York. She was beached on the Jersey Flats.
G. T. Ray	Netherlands	The schooner ran aground at Gilleleje, Denmark. She was on a voyage from an English port to Helsingborg, Sweden.
Guiding Star	United Kingdom	The schooner was driven onto the Duggeno Rocks, off Kilkee, County Clare and was wrecked. Her five crew were rescued.
Hercules	United Kingdom	The steamship was driven ashore at "Banco Chico", Argentina. She was on a voyage from Liverpool, Lancashire to Buenos Aires, Argentina.
Hugh Fortescue	Norway	The barque was driven ashore in the Rio Grande do Norte.
Ida	Flag unknown	The ship ran aground in the Flint Channel. She was on a voyage from Libava, Courland Governorate to Dunkerque, Nord, France.
Ingeborg	Denmark	The schooner was wrecked on the coast of Iceland. Her crew survived. She was on a voyage from Copenhagen to Iceland.
Kalahdin	Flag unknown	The ship ran aground on the Nantucket Shoals, off the coast of Massachusetts, United States. She was refloated and found to be severely leaky.
Kennett	United Kingdom	The steamship struck a rock and was wrecked at "Gando", Canary Islands. All on board were rescued.
Kwangchi	China	The steamship collided with another steamship at Shanghai and was beached.
Lord Clyde	United Kingdom	The schooner was driven ashore on the Swedish coast. She was on a voyage from Hartlepool, County Durham to Varberg, Sweden. She was refloated.
Loyal	Norway	The barque ran aground on the Cochinos Reef, in Cádiz Bay and capsized. Her crew survived. She was on a voyage from Java, Netherlands East Indies to Cádiz, Spain.
Marco	Italy	The barque was wrecked at Suediah, Ottoman Empire.
Miaca	Denmark	The steamship was wrecked on the coast of Iceland. Her crew survived.
Nora Werner	Norway	The ship was driven ashore near Arendal. She was on a voyage from Burntisland, Fife, United Kingdom to Christiania.
Norman	United Kingdom	The steamship was wrecked on the Horn Reef, in the Baltic Sea. She was on a voyage from Saint-Raphaël, Var, France to Stettin.
North Erin	United Kingdom	The steamship ran aground at "Doanaslaw", Ottoman Empire. She was on a voyage from Sevastopol, Russia to Rotterdam, South Holland, Netherlands.
Noviglas	Austria-Hungary	The barque was wrecked at Suediah.
O. B. Suhr	Denmark	The steamship ran aground on Stubben. She was refloated.
President Harbitz	Norway	The schooner was driven ashore at Lisbon, Portugal. She was on a voyage from Sunderland, County Durham to Lisbon. She was refloated and taken in to Lisbon in a leaky condition.
Rønne	Denmark	The steamship ran aground at "Holmetunge" and sprang a leak.
Rossend Castle	United Kingdom	The steamship was driven ashore at Brăila, Romania. She was on a voyage from Galaţi, Romania to Rotterdam.
Runo	United Kingdom	The ship ran aground at Kertch, Russia.
Scandinavia	United Kingdom	The steamship was driven ashore at Dénia, Spain.
Skyro	Flag unknown	The steamship was driven ashore on Læsø, Denmark. She was refloated with assistance and taken in to Copenhagen.
Thetford	United Kingdom	The steamship was driven ashore on Scharhörn, Germany. She was later refloated and resumed her voyage.
Uganda	United Kingdom	The steamship ran aground. She was on a voyage from Middlesbrough, Yorkshire to Malmö, Sweden. She was refloated and take in to Helsingør, Denmark in a leaky condition.
Valeria	Germany	The steamship ran aground at "Refnas", Denmark. She was on a voyage from Flensburg to Hamburg.
W. C. Warner	United States	The ship was abandoned at sea. Her crew were rescued. She was on a voyage from Barbados to Boston, Massachusetts.
William	Germany	The barque was driven ashore on Skagen, Denmark. She was on a voyage from Stettin to Bordeaux, Gironde, France.
Yarn	United Kingdom	The steamship ran aground in the Danube 27 nautical miles (50 km) from its mouth.
Unnamed	Flag unknown	The schooner was driven ashore near Kirkwall, Orkney Islands, United Kingdom.
Eight unnamed vessels	France	Two fishing boats sank off Reykjavík, Iceland and six were driven ashore there with the loss of fifteen of their 58 crew members.
