= Scharhörn =

Uninhabited German island

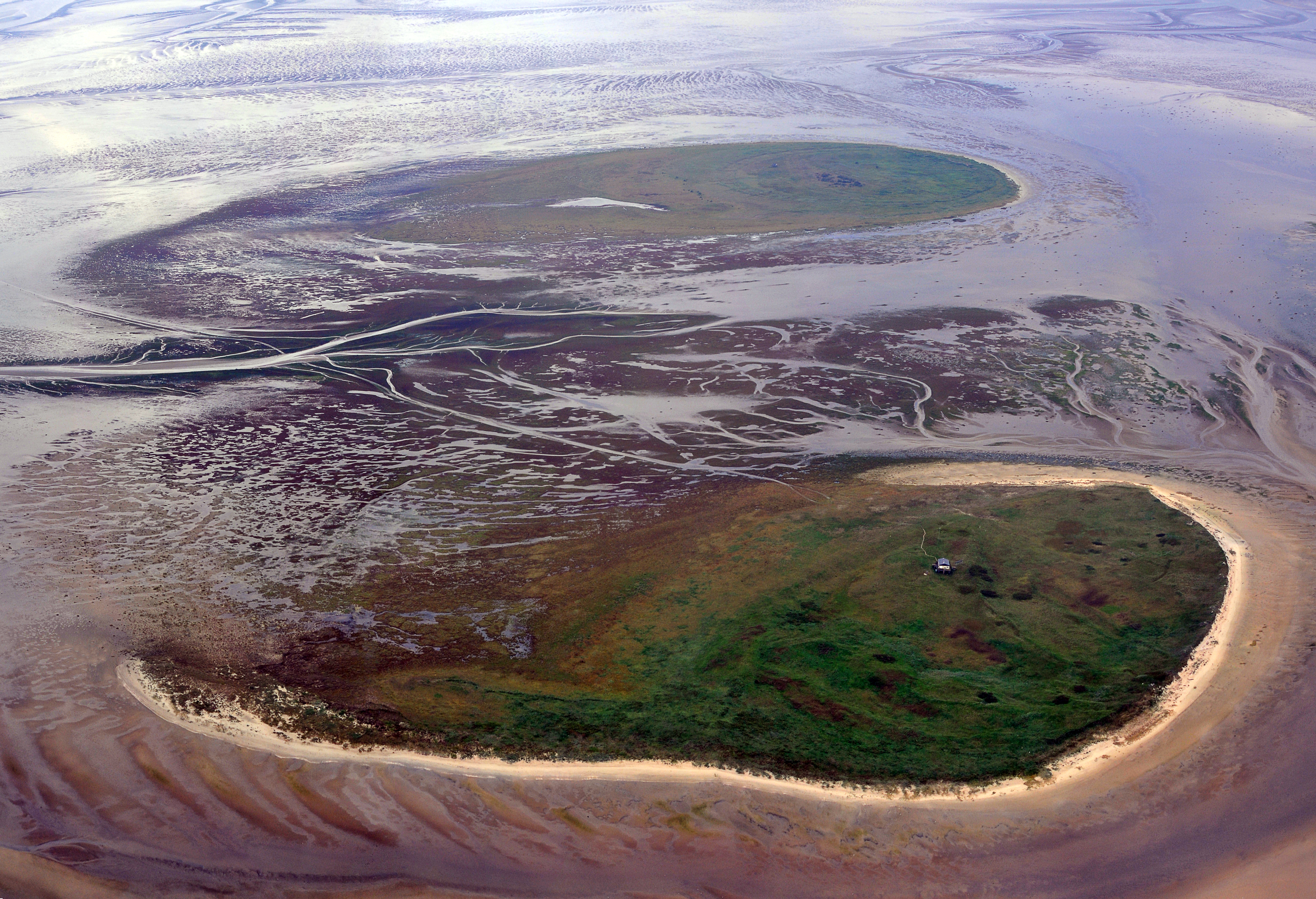
- Aerial photograph of Scharhörn
- Interactive map of Scharhörn

Geography
- Location: North Sea, Wadden Sea, Elbe mouth
- Coordinates: 53°57′42″N 8°26′29″E
- Area: 20 ha (49 acres)

Administration
- Germany
- State: Hamburg
- Borough: Hamburg-Mitte
- Quarter: Hamburg-Neuwerk

Demographics
- Population: 0 (uninhabited)
- Pop. density: 0/km^{2} (0/sq mi)

Scharhörn (German pronunciation: [ˈʃaʁhœʁn]) is an uninhabited island in the North Sea belonging to the city of Hamburg, Germany. The once most important daymark on the North Sea coast, the Scharhörnbake, was maintained here by the City of Hamburg from 1440 to 1979.

== Geography ==
Scharhörn lies by the mouth of the Elbe, approximately 15 km (9 mi) northwest of Cuxhaven and 6 km (4 mi) northwest of the nearby island of Neuwerk. It is a part of Zone 1 of the Hamburg Wadden Sea National Park. Aside from a nature reserve warden, the island has no permanent residents.

Together with the artificial island of Nigehörn the island lies on a large sandbank. Historically the whole area including the reef was called Scharhörn and the sandbank Scharhörnplate. After the human supported formation of the island in the 1920s and finally with the creation of Nigehörn on the same sandbank, the name Scharhörn was only used for the island. Though Scharhörn is generally flood-safe, the 6-metre-high (20 ft) banks of the island are not protected, so the island faces permanent loss of land on the western side as storm floods gradually shift the sandbank eastward.

The sandbank on which Scharhörn and Nigehörn lie is a European Union Natura 2000-designated bird sanctuary, tended to by the environmental group Verein Jordsand. The area, known as Scharhörnplate, is around 2.8 km (1.7 mi) long and 1.5 km (0.93 mi) wide with an area of approximately 500 hectares (1,200 acres). Public access to the island is forbidden, except on official tours or by prior arrangement with the warden.

== History ==
In 1937, the island became part of the Prussian Province of Hanover as a result of the Greater Hamburg Act. The island changed hands again in 1947, when it became part of the newly-drawn state of Lower Saxony, and again in 1969, when it was returned under a treaty to the control of Hamburg for the purpose of constructing a proposed deepwater port on Scharhörn and nearby Neuwerk. The plans foresaw the construction of a 6,000 ha (15,000-acre) mound of land built from dredged sand, which was to be safe from the storm floods of the North Sea and connected to the mainland via a causeway from Scharhörn to Neuwerk to Cuxhaven. The plan was never realised, plagued by protests, high costs, and low levels of public support, but nevertheless remains included in the land use plan of Hamburg.

== Shipwrecks ==
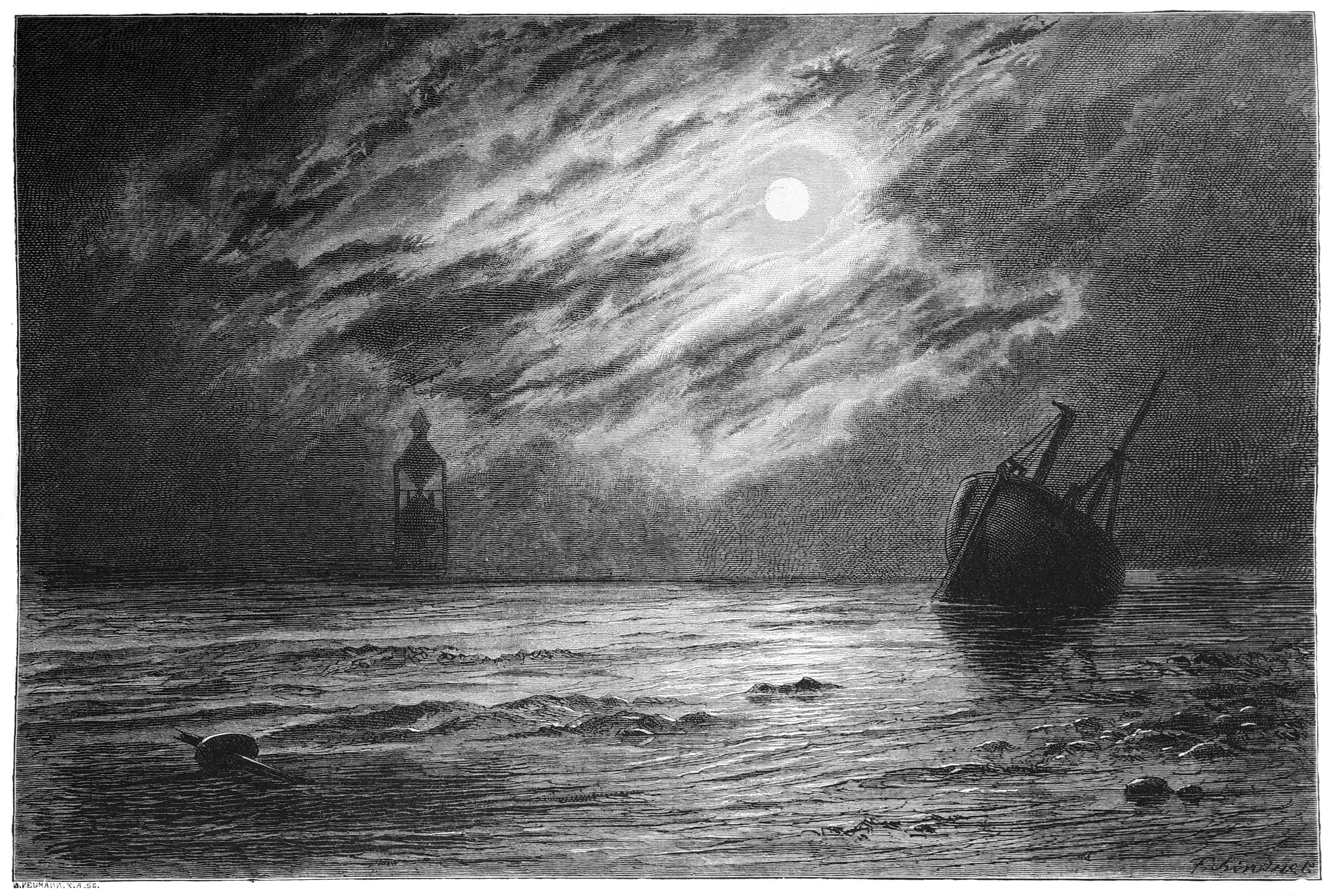
Das Watt bei Scharhörn, Ferdinand Lindner, 1880

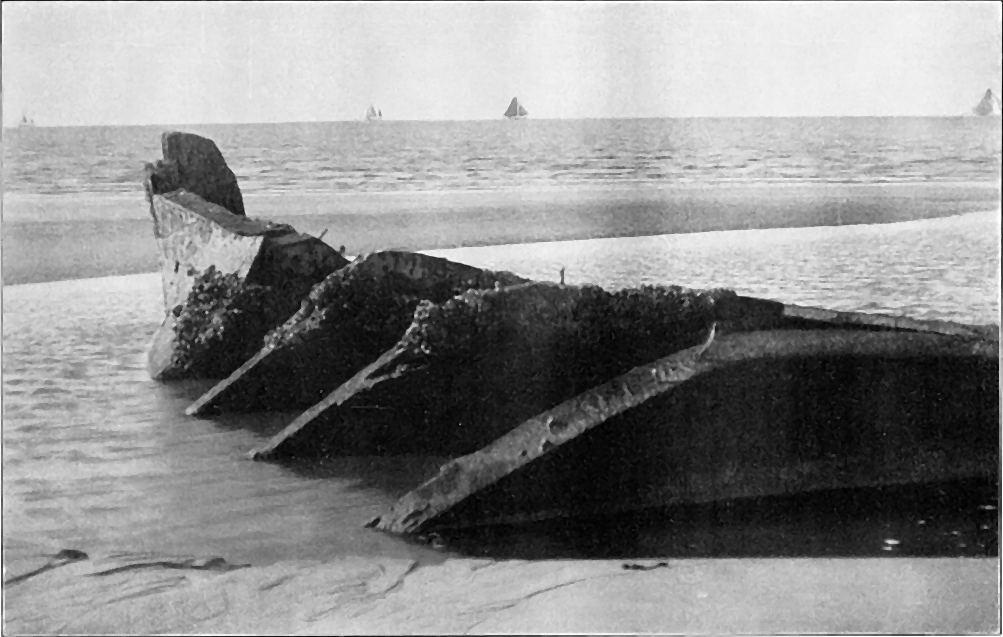
Remains of a wrecked ship at the Scharhörnriff (1908)

The Elbe has been one of the busiest shipping lanes in the world for many centuries, and the waters around Scharhörn were very dangerous until the late 20th century. This has made the reefs a ship graveyard for hundreds of ships, their crews, passengers or cargo. For the people of Neuwerk and the nearby coastal villages, this was an important source of income, sometimes even legally acquired for rescue and salvage operations. But picking up cargo and freight from the coast and from the tidal flats was also common until not long ago.

Shipwrecks near Scharhörn (see also near Neuwerk)
Date	Vessel and description
1802	Anna Catherina was driven ashore on Scharhörn. She was on a voyage from Hamburg to Gibraltar.
July 1806	Vrow Rebecca was driven ashore and wrecked on Scharhörn. Her crew were rescued.
23 November 1815	Lisbon was wrecked on the Scharhörn Sand. Her crew were rescued.
27 September 1815	Borsenhalle was driven ashore and later refloated.
28 February 1817	Drie Gesusters was driven ashore on Scharhörn and was abandoned by her crew. She was on a voyage from London, United Kingdom to Amsterdam, North Holland. She was later taken in to Cuxhaven.
14 August 1819	The transport ship Tods was driven ashore and damaged on Scharhörn.
1 December 1821	Carthagena was driven ashore and wrecked on Scharhörn with the loss of all hands.
2 December 1821	Catherine or Catharina was driven ashore and wrecked on Scharhörn with the loss of all hands.
December 1821	James & Ellen was driven ashore on Scharhörn. She was on a voyage from Jersey to Hamburg. James & Ellen was later refloated.
29 April 1823	Fremling was wrecked on Scharhörn. She was on a voyage from Cette, Hérault, France, to Hamburg.
19 December 1823	Twee Gebroders was driven ashore near Scharhörn. She was on a voyage from Hull, Yorkshire to Bremen. Twee Gebroders was refloated on 18 December and taken in to Cuxhaven.
24 September 1824	Ann was wrecked on Scharhörn. She was on a voyage from Rostock to Hamburg.
29 March 1825	Brunswick ran aground on Scharhörn. She was on a voyage from Hull, Yorkshire, United Kingdom to Hamburg. Brunswick was refloated on 31 March and taken in to Hamburg.
20 August 1826	Hope was driven ashore on Scharhörn. She was on a voyage from London to Hamburg. Hope was later refloated and taken in to Hamburg.
October 1829	Romulus was wrecked on Scharhörn. She was on a voyage from New York, United States to Hamburg.
12 December 1829	Lowe was driven ashore and abandoned on 28 December.
24 August 1830	Unternehmung was lost
November 1831	Vrow Angelina was driven ashore before 22 November. She was refloated but was subsequently wrecked on the Whitt Sand with the loss of all but one of her crew.
5 April 1833	Palm was driven ashore and damaged. Her crew were rescued. Palm was refloated on 10 April and taken in to Cuxhaven.
January 1834	Wharf was driven ashore. She was on a voyage from Goole, Yorkshire to Hamburg.
6 January 1837	Fortuna was driven ashore and wrecked on Scharhörn. She was on a voyage from Livorno, Grand Duchy of Tuscany to Hamburg.
February 1837	Water Witch was driven ashore on Scharhörn. She was on a voyage from Sunderland, County Durham to Hamburg. Water Witch was refloated on 17 February and put in to Hamburg.
20 September 1837	Liverpool sank at Scharhörn. She was on a voyage from Rio de Janeiro, Brazil to Hamburg. She was later refloated and resumed her voyage.
9 December 1837	Anna Maria was wrecked on Scharhörn. She was on a voyage from Copenhagen to Altona.
23 March 1838	Peril was driven ashore on Scharhörn. She was refloated but consequently beached in the Weser, where she became a wreck. Her crew were rescued.
10 May 1838	Johanna was driven ashore on Scharhörn. She was on a voyage from Hamburg to Genoa, Kingdom of Sardinia.
23 January 1839	The brig Patience was abandoned 13 January 1839 off the Willibank, in the North Sea. Her crew were rescued by Bramham (United Kingdom). Patience was on a voyage from Liverpool, Lancashire to Sunderland, County Durham. She was driven ashore on Scharhörn on 23 January, where she was wrecked.
7 March 1841	Nicholas was wrecked on Scharhörn with the loss of a crew member. Survivors were rescued by the steamship Neptune (flag unknown). Nicholas was on a voyage from Newcastle upon Tyne, Northumberland to Hamburg.
19 December 1841	Caroline was wrecked on Scharhörn. Her crew were rescued. She was on a voyage from Málaga, Spain to Hamburg.
4 June 1842	Trio was wrecked on Scharhörn. Her crew were rescued. She was on a voyage from Gothenburg to Hamburg.
2 October 1843	Amalie was wrecked of Scharhörn. Her crew were rescued. She was on a voyage from Peterhead, Aberdeenshire to Stettin.
26 February 1844	George was driven ashore on Scharhörn. She was on a voyage from La Guaira, Venezuela to Hamburg. She was refloated on 1 March and taken in to Cuxhaven.
7 December 1844	Gerda was driven ashore on Scharhörn. She was on a voyage from Bordeaux, Gironde, France to Hamburg. She was later refloated.
19 December 1844	The schooner Clarita or Charita was driven ashore and capsized on Scharhörn. Her eleven crew survived. She was on a voyage from Málaga to Hamburg.
3 March 1845	Adolphe was driven ashore on Scharhörn. She was on a voyage from Valparaíso, Chile to Hamburg. She was refloated on 20 March and taken in to Cuxhaven.
29 August 1845	Christine Mathilde was wrecked off Scharhörn. Her crew were rescued. She was on a voyage from Hamburg to Newcastle upon Tyne, Northumberland, United Kingdom.
12 October 1846	The schooner George was driven ashore on Scharhörn and was abandoned by her crew. She was on a voyage from Grangemouth, Stirlingshire to Rotterdam, South Holland, Netherlands. She was refloated and taken in to Glückstadt, Duchy of Schleswig.
30 March 1847	The brig Emma was driven ashore on Scharhörn. She was on a voyage from Naples, Kingdom of the Two Sicilies to Hamburg. She was refloated the next day and taken in to Cuxhaven in a leaky condition.
29 June 1847	The schooner Agnes was wrecked on Scharhörn. Her crew were rescued. She was on a voyage from Genoa, Kingdom of Sardinia to Hamburg.
23 October 1847	The brig Staindrop was wrecked on Scharhörn. Her crew were rescued. She was on a voyage from Sunderland, County Durham to Hamburg.
22 December 1847	Varel was driven ashore on Scharhörn. She was on a voyage from Newcastle upon Tyne, Northumberland, United Kingdom to Hamburg. She was refloated on 25 December and taken in to Cuxhaven.
9 August 1848	Zion ran aground on Scharhörn. She was on a voyage from Hamburg to Hartlepool, County Durham. She was refloated and taken in to Hamburg in a leaky condition.
19 October 1848	Reindeer was wrecked on Scharhörn. Her crew were rescued. She was on a voyage from Hartlepool, County Durham to Hamburg.
12 November 1848	The ewer Maria was driven ashore on Scharhörn. She was on a voyage from Hull, Yorkshire, United Kingdom to Copenhagen, Denmark. She was refloated and taken in to Cuxhaven.
13 December 1848	Anna Meta was driven ashore on Scharhörn. She was on a voyage from Hartlepool, County Durham, United Kingdom to Hamburg. She was refloated and taken in to Cuxhaven.
8 January 1849	The schooner Zwey Gebruder was driven ashore and wrecked on Scharhörn.
15 August 1849	The brig Friendship ran aground off Scharhörn and sank. Her crew were rescued. She was on a voyage from Liverpool, Lancashire to Hamburg.
8 November 1849	The schooner Rival was driven ashore on Scharhörn and was abandoned by her crew, who were subsequently rescued by Countess of Lonsdale (United Kingdom).
9 November 1849	Louise was driven ashore on Scharhörn. She was refloated and taken in to Cuxhaven.
6 December 1849	Clausine was wrecked on Scharhörn. Her crew were rescued.
9 March 1850	The brig Vertumno was driven ashore on Scharhörn. She was on a voyage from Messina, Sicily to Hamburg. She was refloated with assistance from the steamship Elbe (Hamburg) and taken in to Cuxhaven.
21 March 1850	Liberty ran aground off Scharhörn and was wrecked. Her crew were rescued. She was on a voyage from Seaham, County Durham to Hamburg.
21 March 1850	Romulus ran aground off Scharhörn and was wrecked. Her crew were rescued. She was on a voyage from Stockton-on-Tees, County Durham to Hamburg.
8 November 1850	Camilla ran aground off Scharhörn. Her crew were rescued by a Dutch koff. She was on a voyage from Sunderland, County Durham to Hamburg.
27 October 1851	The schooner Stella ran aground and capsized on Scharhörn and was abandoned. Her crew were rescued by the steamship North Star (United Kingdom). Stella floated off and was subsequently wrecked on Neuwark. She was on a voyage from Hammerfest to Cuxhaven.
5 November 1851	The schooner Sally was wrecked on Scharhörn. Her crew were rescued. She was on a voyage from Liverpool, Lancashire to Husum, Duchy of Holstein.
20 November 1851	Twendre Brodre ran aground off Scharhörn. She was refloated and put in to Cuxhaven in a leaky condition.
February 1852	Charles Kerr was driven ashore on Scharhörn. She was on a voyage from South Shields, County Durham to the East Indies. She was refloated on 8 February and assisted in to Cuxhaven in a sinking condition.
2 May 1852	Emanuel was driven ashore and wrecked on Scharhörn. Her crew were rescued. She was on a voyage from Trondheim, Norway to Altona.
2 March 1853	Christine Marie was driven ashore on Scharhörn. She was on a voyage from Middlesbrough, Yorkshire, United Kingdom to Hamburg. She was refloated on 4 March and taken in to Cuxhaven.
20 September 1853	Ada was wrecked on Scharhörn. Her crew were rescued. She was on a voyage from Newport, Monmouthshire to Harburg.
8 November 1853	Lawson ran aground off Scharhörn. She was on a voyage from Leith, Lothian to Hamburg. She was refloated the next day and taken in to the Elbe.
7 April 1854	Friendship was driven ashore on Scharhörn. She was on a voyage from an English port to Hamburg. She was refloated and taken in to Cuxhaven.
1 January 1855	George Canning was wrecked on Scharhörn/Großer Vogelsand with the loss of all 164 people on board - her crew and 135 passengers. She was on a voyage from Hamburg to New York.
25 April 1855	The brig Aberdeenshire ran aground off Scharhörn. She was on a voyage from Hartlepool, County Durham to Hamburg. She was refloated and taken in to Cuxhaven.
8 November 1856	Spring was driven ashore and wrecked on Scharhörn. Her crew were rescued. She was on a voyage from Middlesbrough, Yorkshire to Altona.
12 March 1857	The collier Atlas ran aground on Scharhörn. Her crew survived. She was on a voyage from Hartlepool, County Durham to Hamburg.
27 November 1857	Carl was wrecked on Scharhörn. She was on a voyage from London, United Kingdom to Königsberg.
14 January 1858	The barque Henrietta Brewis ran aground on Scharhörn. She was on a voyage from Madras, India to Bremen. She was refloated and taken in to Cuxhaven in a leaky condition.
10 November 1858	The brig Henry Bell was driven ashore on Scharhörn. She was a total loss.
21 March 1859	Anacreon was wrecked on Scharhörn. Her crew were rescued.
18 April 1859	Tjaretz Misr was driven ashore and wrecked on Scharhörn. Her crew were rescued. She was on a voyage from Caldera to Hamburg.
19 April 1859	The brig Midsummer was driven ashore on Scharhörn. Her crew survived. she was on a voyage from Cuxhaven to Sunderland, County Durham.
4 January 1860	The koff Thecla was driven ashore on Scharhörn. She was on a voyage from Newcastle upon Tyne, Northumberland, United Kingdom to Hamburg.
26 April 1861	The schooner Mary was wrecked on Scharhörn. Her crew were rescued. She was on a voyage from Portmadoc, Caernarfonshire to Hamburg.
12 April 1862	The barque Integrity ran aground on Scharhörn. She was on a voyage from Sunderland, County Durham to Hamburg. She was refloated and taken in to Cuxhaven in a sinking condition.
20 April 1862	The koff Armegina was driven ashore on Scharhörn. She was on a voyage from London, United Kingdom to Glückstadt, Duchy of Schleswig. She was refloated and taken in to Cuxhaven in a sinking condition.
5 April 1863	Virago was driven ashore on Scharhörn. She was on a voyage from Hartlepool, County Durham to Hamburg. She was refloated and later towed in to Hamburg in a leaky condition.
26 April 1863	An unnamed brig was driven ashore on Scharhörn.
5 October 1863	The barque Neptune was wrecked on Scharhörn. Her crew were rescued. She was on a voyage from Sunderland, County Durham to Hamburg.
3 April 1865	The brig Conrad was driven ashore on Scharhörn. She was on a voyage from Middlesbrough, Yorkshire to Hamburg. She was refloated.
11 July 1868	The brig Hylton Maid ran aground on Scharhörn and was wrecked. Her crew survived. She was on a voyage from Seaham, County Durham to Hamburg. The wreck was refloated on 18 July and towed in to Cuxhaven.
29 July 1869	The schooner Nicholaus was driven ashore on Scharhörn. She was on a voyage from an English port to Cuxhaven. She was refloated with assistance from the steamship Hercules and towed in to Cuxhaven.
25 July 1870	The barque Ben Muick Dhui ran aground and sank on Scharhörn. Her crew survived.
5 October 1870	Progress was driven ashore on Scharhörn. She was on a voyage from Philadelphia, Pennsylvania, United States to Hamburg.
15 October 1870	The barque Regina was driven ashore on Scharhörn. Her crew were rescued. She was on a voyage from New York to Hamburg.
1 November 1870	The steamship Lanoma ran aground and was wrecked on Scharhörn. Her crew were rescued. She was on a voyage from Sunderland, County Durham to Hamburg.
6 December 1870	The full-rigged ship Eastern Belle was driven ashore on Scharhörn. She was refloated and towed in to Cuxhaven.
27 December 1870	Paul and Marie was wrecked on Scharhörn. Her crew were rescued. She was on a voyage from Sunderland, County Durham to Stettin.
December 1870	John Gustav Cordis was driven ashore and wrecked on Scharhörn. She was on a voyage from Newcastle upon Tyne to Hamburg.
30 January 1871	The steamship Commodore was driven ashore on Scharhörn. She was on a voyage from Grimsby, Lincolnshire to Glückstadt, Germany.
April 1871	Albert was driven ashore on Scharhörn. She was on a voyage form Cuxhaven to Lagos, Africa. She was refloated.
25 September 1871	The schooner Catharinawas wrecked on Scharhörn. She was on a voyage from Puerto Plata, Dominican Republic to Hamburg. She was later refloated and taken in to Hamburg.
8 December 1871	The barque Esmeralda was driven ashore on Scharhörn, Germany by ice. She was refloated and taken in to Cuxhaven.
15 April 1873	The barque Isabelita was driven ashore on Scharhörn.
October 1877	The brig Saldanho was driven ashore on Scharhörn and capsized. Her crew were rescued. She was on a voyage from Hamburg to Laga.
24 September 1878	The brigantine Mercur ran aground off Scharhörn. She was on a voyyage from Hamburg, Germany to Saint Thomas, Virgin Islands. She was refloated.
16 May 1879	The barque Scythia ran aground on Scharhörn. She was refloated with assistance and taken in to Cuxhaven, Germany.
October 1882	Robert was driven ashore and wrecked on Scharhörn. She was on a voyage from Fraserburgh, Aberdeenshire to Harburg, Prussia.
1 September 1883	The steamship Europa was wrecked on the Wittsand, in the North Sea off Scharhörn.
April 1888	The steamship Thetford was driven ashore on Scharhörn, Germany. She was later refloated and resumed her voyage.
December 1888	The barque Giorgio Washington was driven ashore on Scharhörn. Her crew were rescued. She was on a voyage from Buenos Aires to Hamburg.
21 April 1903	The steamer Freia was wrecked near Scharhörn on her passage from Kristiana to Harlingen, Friesland, Netherlands.
9 November 1915	The S90-class torpedo boat SMS S129 ran aground and sank in the North Sea near the island of Scharhörn with no casualties.
21 October 1931	Peder Most ran aground and was refloated on 24 October.
29 March 1939	The cargo ship Adele Ohlrogge ran aground at Scharhörn in the Wadden Sea. Refloated the next day.
29 December 1940	The cargo ship PLM-23 (5,417 or 5,642 GRT, 1921) ran aground and was wrecked.
8 June 1942	Sperrbrecher 15 Taronga (7,003 or 7,064 GRT, 1934) was severely damaged off Scharhörn by Allied aircraft. She put into Hamburg where she was declared a constructive total loss and decommissioned.
4 January 1954	Traunstein ran aground. Traunstein was refloated on the same day but Leros was almost lost in many damaging attempts to save the coast from a huge oil spill. She was pulled off the reef and towed into Cuxhaven on early morning of Saturday 10 January.
4 January 1954	The tanker Leros ran aground. She was pulled off the reef and towed into Cuxhaven on early morning 10 January, after many failed attempts and heavy damage.
17 January 1955	The tanker Gerd Mærsk ran aground on Scharhörn, in the mouth of the Elbe, West Germany Gerd Mærsk, loaded with crude oil, leaked on the Scharhörn reef during a heavy snowstorm at hurricane force, while on a voyage to Hamburg. During the rescue operation, it was decided to pump part of the cargo overboard to keep the ship from breaking apart, releasing about 7000-8000 tons of crude oil. In the meantime, the oil slick covered an area of 1600 square kilometers and reached the islands of Amrum, Föhr, Sylt, Rømø and Fanø despite considerable attempts to combat it. As far away as Esbjerg, the spills drew widespread bird deaths.
25 November 1962	The Alstertor (2460 GRT) ran aground and could later be pulled off the reef.
8 December 1967	The freighter Emmanuel M (5400 GRT) ran aground off Scharhörn on and was looted by islanders from Neuwerk. She was salvaged in July 1970 and towed to Cuxhaven.
January 1969	The freighter Njandoma broke apart on Scharhörn with toxic chemicals on board while on voyage to England. The barrels could be salvaged from the halves of the ship.
28 October 1974	The turnaround of the freighter Great Luck (4300 GRT) failed after the auxiliary diesel failed in a storm. The ship was moored at Scharhörn until its salvage on 17 November.
