= List of shipwrecks in May 1838 =

The list of shipwrecks in May 1838 includes ships sunk, foundered, wrecked, grounded, or otherwise lost during May 1838.

== 1 May ==
List of shipwrecks: 1 May 1838
Ship	State	Description
Priscilla	United Kingdom	The ship was wrecked at Point-aux-Barques, Newfoundland, British North America. Her crew were rescued. She was on a voyage from London to Quebec City, Lower Canada, British North America.

== 2 May ==
List of shipwrecks: 2 May 1838
Ship	State	Description
Duke of Wellington	United Kingdom	The paddle steamer was run into by the schooner Fairy (United Kingdom) and was beached in the Humber. She was later refloated.

== 3 May ==
List of shipwrecks: 3 May 1838
Ship	State	Description
Alexandria	United States	The ship was wrecked whilst on a voyage from New York to Jamaica. Her crew were rescued.
Salt Rock	United Kingdom	The brig ran aground on the Ridge Sand, in the North Sea off the coast of Kent. She was later refloated.
Zaanstrom	Belgium	The ship foundered off the Cape of Good Hope. Her crew were rescued.

== 4 May ==
List of shipwrecks: 4 May 1838
Ship	State	Description
Durham	United Kingdom	The ship was driven ashore at Weymouth, Dorset. She was later refloated and taken into Weymouth.

== 5 May ==
List of shipwrecks: 5 May 1838
Ship	State	Description
Horace	United States	The barque was wrecked on rocks off Kennebunkport, Maine and then came ashore. She was on a voyage from New Orleans, Louisiana to Liverpool, Lancashire, United Kingdom.

== 6 May ==
List of shipwrecks: 6 May 1838
Ship	State	Description
Constant	Belgium	The ship ran aground in the Scheldt. She was on a voyage from Antwerp to Liverpool, Lancashire, United Kingdom.
Hope	United Kingdom	The ship was beached in the River Great Ouse 4 nautical miles (7.4 km) from King's Lynn, Norfolk.
Wilhelmine	Stettin	The brig was driven ashore at Sunderland, County Durham, United Kingdom. She was on a voyage from Stettin to Sunderland. Wilhelmine was refloated the next day.

== 7 May ==
List of shipwrecks: 7 May 1838
Ship	State	Description
Maria	Bremen	The ship was driven ashore on the Sandwich Flats. She was on a voyage from Bremen to San Sebastián, Spain. Mariawas refloated on 8 May and resumed her voyage.
Mary	United Kingdom	The ship struck the Sizewell Bank, in the North Sea off the coast of Suffolk and was consequently beached at Orford, Suffolk. She was on a voyage from Newcastle upon Tyne, Northumberland to Ipswich, Suffolk.
Rebecca	United Kingdom	The ship was wrecked on the Millevache Shoal, off the coast of Labrador, British North America. She was on a voyage from Quebec City, Lower Canada to the Clyde. Rebecca was refloated in late July and taken into Quebec City.

== 9 May ==
List of shipwrecks: 9 May 1838
Ship	State	Description
Brother	United Kingdom	The ship was driven ashore at Montrose, Forfarshire She was refloated and put back to Montrose.
Minerva	United Kingdom	The ship was driven ashore and damaged at Montrose. She was later refloated and put back to Montrose.
Phœnix	United Kingdom	The ship capsized at Jersey, Channel Islands.

== 10 May ==
List of shipwrecks: 10 May 1838
Ship	State	Description
Johanna	Hamburg	The ship was driven ashore on Scharhörn, Hamburg. She was on a voyage from Hamburg to Genoa, Kingdom of Sardinia.
Pauline	Hamburg	The ship ran aground on the Vogel Sand, in the North Sea. She was on a voyage from Hamburg to a Baltic port.
Thomas and Elizabeth	United Kingdom	The ship ran aground on the Platters Sand, in the North Sea off the coast of Essex. She was on a voyage from London to Althorpe, Lincolnshire. Thomas and Elizabeth was refloated and put into Harwich, Essex.

== 11 May ==
List of shipwrecks: 11 May 1838
Ship	State	Description
Elizabeth	United Kingdom	The ship foundered in Carnarvon Bay north of Aberdovey, Merionethshire with the loss of all hands.
Felix	France	The ship was driven ashore near Calais. Her crew were rescued. She was on a voyage from Sunderland, County Durham, United Kingdom to Rouen, Seine-Inférieure.
Kent	United Kingdom	The ship sprang a leak and foundered in the Atlantic Ocean (47°22′N 27°16′W). Her crew were rescued by Demerara Packet and Hobart (United Kingdom).
Salus	United Kingdom	The brig was driven into the New Cut Bridge, King's Lynn, Norfolk and sank.
Symmetry	United Kingdom	The schooner ran aground on the East Barrows Sand, in the North Sea off the coast of Essex. She was on a voyage from Newcastle upon Tyne, Northumberland to Bridport, Dorset. Symmetry was refloated the next day and put into Wivenhoe, Essex.

== 12 May ==
List of shipwrecks: 12 May 1838
Ship	State	Description
Commerce	United Kingdom	The ship was driven ashore and wrecked 10 nautical miles (19 km) south of Bridlington, Yorkshire.
Magnet	United Kingdom	The ship was sunk by ice off Riga, Russia. Her crew were rescued. She was on a voyage from Dundee, Forfarshire to Riga.
Mary Ann	United Kingdom	The schooner was wrecked on the Haisborough Sands, in the North Sea off the coast of Norfolk. She was on a voyage from Stockton-on-Tees, County Durham to Exmouth, Devon.
Monmouth	United Kingdom	The ship collided with Pomona and foundered off the Calf of Man, Isle of Man. Her crew were rescued. She was on a voyage from Whitehaven, Cumberland to Dublin.

== 13 May ==
List of shipwrecks: 13 May 1838
Ship	State	Description
Mary Ann	United Kingdom	The ship was driven ashore at Pictou, Nova Scotia, British North America.
Rebecca	United Kingdom	The ship was wrecked on the Millevaches Shoal. Her crew were rescued. She was on a voyage from Greenock, Renfrewshire to Quebec City, Lower Canada, British North America.

== 15 May ==
List of shipwrecks: 15 May 1838
Ship	State	Description
Diana	United Kingdom	The ship was wrecked on the Horn Reef, off Ringkøbing, Denmark. Her crew were rescued. She was on a voyage from Amsterdam, North Holland, Netherlands to Riga, Russia.

== 19 May ==
List of shipwrecks: 19 May 1838
Ship	State	Description
Agnes	(United Kingdom of Great Britain and Ireland) Guernsey	The ship was driven ashore at Sidmouth, Devon. She was refloated on 22 May at towed into Starcross.
Clarence	United Kingdom	The ship was driven ashore at Sidmouth.
Eclair	Norway	The ship foundered in the North Sea 20 nautical miles (37 km) off Whitby, Yorkshire, United Kingdom. Her crew were rescued. She was on a voyage from Antwerp, Belgium to Bergen.
Hope	United Kingdom	The ship was driven ashore and wrecked near the Orfordness Lighthouse, Suffolk. Her crew were rescued. She was on a voyage from London to Bridlington, Yorkshire.
John Cook	United Kingdom	The schooner capsized off Ryhope, County Durham. She subsequently drove ashore and was wrecked. Her crew were rescued.
Sybil	United Kingdom	The ship was abandoned off Poorhead, County Cork. Her crew were rescued.

== 20 May ==
List of shipwrecks: 20 May 1838
Ship	State	Description
X. Y. Z.	United Kingdom	The ship was driven ashore at South Shields, County Durham. Her crew were rescued. She was refloated on 26 May and taken into South Shields.

== 23 May ==
List of shipwrecks: 23 May 1838
Ship	State	Description
Harriet	United Kingdom	The ship was driven ashore at Crygill, Anglesey. She was on a voyage from Antwerp, Belgium to Liverpool, Lancashire. Harriet was refloated the next day and resumed her voyage.

== 24 May ==
List of shipwrecks: 24 May 1838
Ship	State	Description
Edlina Henriette	Hamburg	The ship foundered 5 nautical miles (9.3 km) off Stavanger, Norway. Her crew were rescued. She was on a voyage from Hamburg to Bergen, Norway.

== 27 May ==
List of shipwrecks: 27 May 1838
Ship	State	Description
Amelia	United Kingdom	The ship was wrecked on rocks in the Black Sea off "Foultcha" or "Trultcha". Her crew were rescued.
Beauty	United Kingdom	The ship was wrecked on Green Island. She was on a voyage from Halifax, Nova Scotia, British North America to Saint John's, Newfoundland and Fortune Bay.
George	United Kingdom	The ship was wrecked on St. Paul Island, Nova Scotia. She was on a voyage from Newfoundland to Waterford.
John	United Kingdom	The ship was driven ashore at Seaton Sluice, Northumberland. She was on a voyage from Aberdeen to Sunderland, County Durham. John was later refloated and taken into Seaton Sluice.

== 28 May ==
List of shipwrecks: 28 May 1838
Ship	State	Description
Isabella	United Kingdom	The ship struck the Sheringham Shoal, in the North Sea off the coast of Norfolk and foundered. Her crew were rescued. She was on a voyage from Hartlepool, County Durham to London.

== 29 May ==
List of shipwrecks: 29 May 1838
Ship	State	Description
Flèche	Belgium	The ship foundered in the Mediterranean Sea off Almería, Spain. Her crew were rescued. She was on a voyage from Ostend, West Flanders to Algiers, Algeria.
Sir Robert Peel	United Kingdom	Patriot War, Rebellions of 1837–1838: The paddle steamer was set afire and destroyed by Patriotes in the Saint Lawrence River at Mullet Creek Bay, Lower Canada. Her crew were rescued by Oneida ( (United Kingdom of Great Britain and Ireland) British North America).

== 30 May ==
List of shipwrecks: 30 May 1838
Ship	State	Description
Belzoni	United Kingdom	The ship was driven ashore on Saarenmaa, Russia. Her crew were rescued. She was on a voyage from Sunderland, County Durham to Kronstadt, Russia.
Bystro	Imperial Russian Navy	The tender was driven ashore at Tuapse.
Femistokl	Imperial Russian Navy	The brig was driven ashore at Tuapse with the loss of two of her 149 crew.
Frembengeren	Hamburg	The ship ran aground on the Oster Till with the loss of two of her crew. She was on a voyage from Livorno, Grand Duchy of Tuscany to Hamburg. Frembengeren was later refloated.
Gazelle	(United Kingdom of Great Britain and Ireland) British North America	The steamship ran aground on a reef and consequently sank. Her crew survived. She was on a voyage from Saint John, New Brunswick to Windsor, Upper Canada.
Langeron	Imperial Russian Navy	The transport ship was driven ashore at Tuapse. Her crew survived.
Luch	Imperial Russian Navy	The tender was driven ashore at Tuapse with the loss of three of her 48 crew.
Oderin	United Kingdom	The schooner was wrecked 12 nautical miles (22 km) north of Figueira da Foz, Portugal. Her crew were rescued. She was on a voyage from Newfoundland to Figueira da Foz.
Yazon	Imperial Russian Navy	The steamship was driven ashore at Tuapse with the loss of 41 of her 61 crew.
Eight unnamed vessels	Russia	The ships were driven ashore at Tuapse.

== 31 May ==
List of shipwrecks: 31 May 1838
Ship	State	Description
Frank	United Kingdom	The ship departed from Morant Bay, Jamaica for Liverpool, Lancashire. No further trace, presumed foundered in the Atlantic Ocean with the loss of all hands.
Messemvriya	Imperial Russian Navy	The corvette was abandoned 2 versts (1.15 nautical miles (2.13 km) off Sochi with the loss of seven of her crew and six reported missing. She came ashore and was wrecked.
Nicholas I	Russia	The steamship caught fire and was beached at Gross Klütz, Prussia, where she was destroyed. Of her 33 crew and 132 passengers, three crew and two passengers were killed. Nicholas I was on a voyage from Saint Petersburgh, Russia to Travemünde, Lübeck.
Varna	Imperial Russian Navy	The Tenedos-class frigate was driven ashore and wrecked at Sochi with the loss of seventeen of her 334 crew.
Six unnamed vessels	Russia	The ships were driven ashore at Sochi. Their crews survived.

== Unknown date ==
List of shipwrecks: Unknown date in May 1838
Ship	State	Description
Ambassador	United Kingdom	The ship ran aground on the Cat Key. She was on a voyage from New Orleans, Louisiana, United States to Liverpool, Lancashire. Ambassador was later refloated and taken into Nassau, Bahamas.
Amedée	France	The ship foundered in the Atlantic Ocean. Her crew were rescued by Trois Monts Bouges Magnique (France). Amedée was on a voyage from Laguna to Havre de Grâce, Seine-Inférieure.
Brilliant	United Kingdom	The full-rigged ship was driven ashore on Red Island, Newfoundland, British North America before 8 May. She was later refloated and towed into Quebec City, Lower Canada by British America ( (United Kingdom of Great Britain and Ireland) British North America), arriving on 14 June.
Canadian	United Kingdom	The barque was wrecked at Bic, Lower Canada, British North America before 26 May. She was on a voyage from London to Quebec City.
Caroline	United Kingdom	The barque sprang a leak and was abandoned in the Atlantic Ocean off Cape Ann, Massachusetts, United States before 8 May. All on board were rescued by Heroine (United Kingdom).
Cora	United Kingdom	The ship was abandoned in the Grand Banks of Newfoundland.
Frau Catharina	Denmark	The ship was wrecked near Ebeltoft. Her crew were rescued. She was on a voyage from Newcastle upon Tyne, Northumberland, United Kingdom to Horsens.
General Graham	United Kingdom	The full-rigged ship was driven ashore at Cape Ray, Newfoundland before 8 May. She was later refloated and taken into Quebec City for repairs.
James Seyre	(United Kingdom of Great Britain and Ireland) British North America	The brig was abandoned in the Atlantic Ocean before 1 May.
Jean Bart	France	The whaler was burnt at Ocean Bay on Chatham Island in early May. Her crew were murdered by the local inhabitants.
Jonge Ranger	Netherlands	The ship was abandoned in the North Sea. She was subsequently taken into Mundesley, Norfolk, United Kingdom.
Lord Sidmouth	United Kingdom	The ship was driven ashore between Carrabas Point and Trinity Cove before 14 May.
Lord Wellington	United Kingdom	The brig was wrecked on Cape Breton Island, Nova Scotia, British North America. There were at least eleven survivors.
Mangerton	United Kingdom	The schooner ran aground on the Kentish Knock before 7 May. She was on a voyage from London to Arkhangelsk, Russia. Mangerton was later refloated and resumed her voyage.
Margaret and Graham	United Kingdom	The ship was driven ashore and damaged near Margate, Kent. She was later refloated and repaired.
Marquis Wellington	United Kingdom	The ship was sunk by ice. Her crew were rescued by Arabian.
Michael	United Kingdom	The ship was holed by ice and foundered before 14 May. She was on a voyage from Dundee, Forfarshire to Riga, Russia.
Providentia	United Kingdom	The ship ran aground and sank at Wells-next-the-Sea, Norfolk.
Ross	United Kingdom	The ship ran aground on a reef off Cape Ray and was damaged.
Syllerley	United Kingdom	The full-rigged ship was wrecked 6 nautical miles (11 km) east of Cape Ray. She was on a voyage from Liverpool to Quebec City.
Unity	(United Kingdom of Great Britain and Ireland) British North America	The brig was abandoned in the Atlantic Ocean before 17 May.
