= List of shipwrecks in June 1842 =

The list of shipwrecks in June 1842 includes ships sunk, foundered, wrecked, grounded, or otherwise lost during June 1842.

== 1 June ==
List of shipwrecks: 1 June 1842
| Ship | State | Description |
|---|---|---|
| Gipsy | United Kingdom | The ship was wrecked in the Caicos Islands. Her crew were rescued. She was on a voyage from Halifax, Nova Scotia, British North America to Jamaica. |
| Swiss Boy | Belgium | The ship ran aground in the Terneuse Channel. She was on a voyage from Havana, Cuba to Ghent, East Flanders. |

== 2 June ==
List of shipwrecks: 2 June 1842
| Ship | State | Description |
|---|---|---|
| Castor | France | The ship capsized at Saint-Malo, Ille-et-Vilaine and was severely damaged. |
| Sir George Arthur | United Kingdom | The transport ship was wrecked at Bermuda with the loss of two of her crew. |
| Washington | United Kingdom | The ship was abandoned off the Horn Reef, in the Baltic Sea. She was on a voyage from Goole, Yorkshire to Pillau, Prussia. Washington was taken into Hjerting, Denmark on 9 June. |

== 3 June ==
List of shipwrecks: 3 June 1842
| Ship | State | Description |
|---|---|---|
| Agnes Ewing | United Kingdom | The ship was driven ashore and severely damaged in a typhoon at Calcutta, India. |
| Albatros | United Kingdom | The ship was damaged in a typhoon at Calcutta. |
| Annunchunder | United Kingdom | The ship was severely damaged in a typhoon at Calcutta. |
| Assam | United Kingdom | The steamship was reported missing after a typhoon at Calcutta. |
| Bengal Packet | United Kingdom | The ship was severely damaged in a typhoon at Calcutta. |
| Betsey & Sarah | United Kingdom | The ship was severely damaged in a typhoon at Calcutta. |
| Bhangaratee | United Kingdom | The flat sank in a typhoon at Calcutta. |
| Bhomanjee Hormanjee | United Kingdom | The ship was damaged in a typhoon in the Hooghly River. |
| Brothers | United Kingdom | The ship was damaged in a typhoon at Calcutta. |
| Buccaneer | United Kingdom | The ship was severely damaged in a typhoon at Calcutta. |
| Canopus | United Kingdom | The ship was driven ashore in a typhoon at Calcutta. |
| Cashmere Merchant | United Kingdom | The ship was damaged in a typhoon at Calcutta. |
| Cavendish Bentinck | United Kingdom | The ship was driven ashore in the Hooghly River downstream of Cossipore, India. |
| Child | United Kingdom | The ship was severely damaged in a typhoon at Calcutta. |
| Chiloe | United States | The ship was driven ashore and damaged in a typhoon in the Hooghly River at Barripore, India. |
| Colombine | United Kingdom | The ship was driven ashore in a typhoon at Calcutta. |
| Colonel Newall | United Kingdom | The ship was damaged in a typhoon in the Hooghly River. |
| Coringo Packet, and Resolution | United Kingdom; United Kingdom | The Coringo Packet, Resolution and another vessel were driven into each other and damaged in a typhoon at Calcutta. Resolution was severely damaged. |
| Courrier de Bourbon | France | The ship sank in a typhoon at Calcutta. |
| Currency | United Kingdom | The ship was severely damaged in a typhoon at Calcutta. |
| David Malcolm | United Kingdom | The ship was damaged in a typhoon at Calcutta. |
| Diana | United Kingdom | The hulk sank in a typhoon at Calcutta. |
| Eleanor Lancaster | United Kingdom | The ship ran aground and was wrecked in a typhoon in the Hooghly River at Calcutta. |
| Ewell Grove | United Kingdom | The ship was damaged in a typhoon at Calcutta. |
| Exmouth | United Kingdom | The ship was damaged in a typhoon in the Hooghly River. |
| Flora | Norway | The ship was driven ashore and wrecked on Ameland, Friesland, Netherlands. Her crew were rescued. She was on a voyage from Frederickshald to Calais, France. |
| Fort Gloucester | United Kingdom | The ship was severely damaged in a typhoon at Calcutta. |
| Futtal Curreem | United Kingdom | The ship was severely damaged in a typhoon at Calcutta. |
| Gelinghee | United Kingdom | The flat was severely damaged at Calcutta. |
| George McLeod | United Kingdom | The ship was wrecked in a typhoon at Calcutta. |
| Gipsey | United Kingdom | The ship was damaged in a typhoon at Calcutta. |
| Globe | United Kingdom | The ship foundered off Kedgeree India in a typhoon with loss of life. |
| Guisachan | United Kingdom | The ship was damaged in a typhoon in the Hooghly River. |
| Gundevek or Gundemunck | United Kingdom | The steamship sank in a typhoon at Calcutta. |
| Hannah | United Kingdom | The ship was severely damaged in a typhoon at Calcutta. |
| Helen | United Kingdom | The ship was damaged in a typhoon in the Hooghly River. |
| Hero | United Kingdom | The ship was damaged in a typhoon at Calcutta. |
| Jalinghee | United Kingdom | The flat was severely damaged in a typhoon at Calcutta. |
| James Turcand | United Kingdom | The ship was driven ashore and severely damaged in a typhoon at Calcutta. |
| John Adam | United Kingdom | The ship was driven ashore and severely damaged in a typhoon at Calcutta. |
| Julia | United Kingdom | The ship was severely damaged in a typhoon at Calcutta. |
| Kandiana | United Kingdom | The ship was severely damaged in a typhoon at Calcutta. |
| Lady Clifford | United Kingdom | The ship was driven ashore in a typhoon at Calcutta. |
| Lord Althorp | United Kingdom | The ship was damaged in a typhoon at Calcutta. |
| Lord Western | United Kingdom | The troopship was driven ashore at Mud Point, Calcutta. She was consequently condemned. |
| Lord William Bentinck | United Kingdom | The steamship sank in a typhoon at Calcutta. |
| Maria | United Kingdom | The ship was severely damaged in a typhoon at Calcutta. |
| Mars | United Kingdom | The ship was severely damaged in a typhoon at Calcutta. |
| Mary Ann | United Kingdom | The ship was severely damaged in a typhoon at Calcutta. |
| Meg Meldon | United Kingdom | The ship was driven ashore and severely damaged in a typhoon at Calcutta. |
| Monarch | Stettin | The ship was driven ashore and wrecked on Læsø, Denmark. She was on a voyage from Çeşme, Ottoman Empire to Stettin. |
| Mount Stewart | United Kingdom | The ship was damaged in a typhoon in the Hooghly River. |
| New Jersey | United States | The ship was severely damaged in a typhoon at Calcutta. |
| Norval | United Kingdom | The ship was severely damaged in a typhoon at Calcutta. |
| Old England | United Kingdom | The ship was severely damaged in a typhoon at Calcutta. |
| Patriot King | United Kingdom | The ship was damaged in a typhoon in the Hooghly River. |
| Persia or Persian | United Kingdom | The ship was severely damaged in a typhoon at Calcutta. |
| Potomac | United States | The ship was driven ashore and severely damaged in a typhoon at Cassipore. |
| Prince Albert | United Kingdom | The ship was driven ashore in a typhoon at Calcutta. |
| Regina | United Kingdom | The ship was severely damaged in a typhoon at Calcutta. |
| Resolucion | Spain | The ship was wrecked near Lemvig, Norway. She was on a voyage from "Leyo" to Riga, Russia. |
| Resolution | United Kingdom | The ship was driven ashore and severely damaged in a typhoon at Calcutta. |
| Roseana | United Kingdom | The ship was severely damaged in a typhoon at Calcutta. |
| Royal Sovereign | United Kingdom | The ship was severely damaged in a typhoon at Calcutta. |
| Santon | United Kingdom | The ship was severely damaged in a typhoon at Calcutta. |
| Satellite | United Kingdom | The steamship was driven ashore in a typhoon at Calcutta. |
| Selma | United Kingdom | The ship was damaged in a typhoon at Calcutta. |
| Senator | United States | The ship was driven ashore and wrecked in a typhoon at Cassipore. |
| Stalhart | United Kingdom | The ship was severely damaged in a typhoon at Calcutta. She was on a voyage from Calcutta to Bombay. |
| Soorina or Soorma | United Kingdom | The flat sank in a typhoon at Calcutta. |
| Sumatra | United Kingdom | The ship was damaged in a typhoon in the Hooghly River. |
| Symmetry | United Kingdom | The ship foundered off Kedgeree in a typhoon with loss of life. |
| Tigris | United Kingdom | The ship was damaged in a typhoon in the Hooghly River. |
| Union | United Kingdom | The ship was severely damaged in a typhoon at Calcutta. |
| Vansittart | United Kingdom | The East Indiaman was in the harbour at Bombay, India ready for a voyage to China. At 2 a.m. a fire was discovered. Despite every assistance from steam and other vessels, "this fine ship was destroyed under very suspicious circumstances." Several lives were lost. |
| Warrior | United Kingdom | The ship was severely damaged in a typhoon at Calcutta. |
| Waterwitch | United Kingdom | The ship sank in a typhoon at Calcutta. She was on a voyage from Calcutt to China. |

== 4 June ==
List of shipwrecks: 4 June 1842
| Ship | State | Description |
|---|---|---|
| Skelton Castle | United Kingdom | The ship was wrecked on the Weser Till. Her crew were rescued. She was on a voyage from Stockton-on-Tees, County Durham to Hamburg. |
| Trio | Sweden | The ship was wrecked on Scharhörn. Her crew were rescued. She was on a voyage from Gothenburg to Hamburg. |

== 5 June ==
List of shipwrecks: 6 June 1842
| Ship | State | Description |
|---|---|---|
| Magnet | United Kingdom | The ship was driven ashore near Montreal, Province of Canada, British North America. She was on a voyage from Montreal to Liverpool, Lancashire. She was later refloated. |

== 6 June ==
List of shipwrecks: 6 June 1842
| Ship | State | Description |
|---|---|---|
| Barbara | United Kingdom | The sloop was destroyed by fire in the North Sea 4 nautical miles (7.4 km) off Montrose, Forfarshire. All eleven people on board survived. She was on a voyage from Leith, Lothian to Wick, Caithness. |

== 7 June ==
List of shipwrecks: 7 June 1842
| Ship | State | Description |
|---|---|---|
| Carib | United Kingdom | The ship departed from Demerara, British Honduras for London. Presumed subsequently foundered in the Atlantic Ocean with the loss of all hands. A boat washed up at Saint Gilles, on the French coast in February 1843. |
| Orontes | United Kingdom | The ship was wrecked on the Grampuses, off the south east coast of Grenada. Her crew were rescued. She was on a voyage from Dundee, Forfarshire to Grenada. |

== 8 June ==
List of shipwrecks: 8 June 1842
| Ship | State | Description |
|---|---|---|
| Brougham | United Kingdom | The ship ran aground on a reef in the Cook Strait. She was refloated and proceeded on her voyage from New Zealand to South America. |
| Columbine | United Kingdom | The ship was driven ashore at Calcutta, India. |
| Courrier de Bourbon | France | The ship sank at Calcutta. |
| George McLevel | United Kingdom | The ship was wrecked at Calcutta. |
| James Turcan | United Kingdom | The ship was driven ashore at Calcutta. |
| John Adams | United Kingdom | The ship was driven ashore at Calcutta. |
| Stalhart | United Kingdom | The ship was severely damaged at Calcutta. |

== 9 June ==
List of shipwrecks: 9 June 1842
| Ship | State | Description |
|---|---|---|
| Angerona | United Kingdom | The ship ran aground at Maryport, Cumberland. She was on a voyage from Sierra Leone to Maryport. |
| Ardgowan | United Kingdom | The ship was abandoned in the Atlantic Ocean. Her crew were rescued by James Harris (United Kingdom). |
| Beccles | United Kingdom | The ship was driven ashore near "St. James's Castle", in the Gulf of Smyrna. She was on a voyage from Smyrna, Ottoman Empire to Odesa. Beccles was refloated with assistance from HMS Aigle (Royal Navy) and resumed her voyage. |
| Lavinia | United Kingdom | The ship ran aground on the Gunfleet Sand, in the North Sea off the coast of Essex. She was on a voyage from Danzig to London. She was refloated and taken into the River Colne. |
| Leopoldine Ross | France | The barque was driven ashore and wrecked at Castillos, Uruguay. Her crew, officers excepted, saved themselves, leaving the rest to their fate. She was carrying 303 passengers, of whom 231 perished. Her captain also died. Leopoldina Ross was on a voyage from Bayonne, Loire-Inférieure to Montevideo, Uruguay. |

== 10 June ==
List of shipwrecks: 10 June 1842
| Ship | State | Description |
|---|---|---|
| Cornwallis | United Kingdom | The East Indiaman was destroyed by fire at Bombay, India. |
| Nesbitt | United Kingdom | The barque was wrecked in the Caicos Passage. All on board were rescued by Oldo (United States). Nesbitt was on a voyage from Port Morant, Jamaica to London. |

== 11 June ==
List of shipwrecks: 11 June 1842
| Ship | State | Description |
|---|---|---|
| Commerce | France | The brig foundered in the North Sea off the Newarp Lightship ( Trinity House). Her crew were rescued. She was on a voyage from Sunderland, County Durham, United Kingdom to Rouen, Seine-Inférieure. |
| Everthorpe | United Kingdom | The ship sprang a leak and was beached at Grimsby, Lincolnshire. She was on a voyage from Newcastle upon Tyne, Northumberland to Constantinople, Ottoman Empire. |
| Vesta | United Kingdom | The ship was driven ashore in the Dardanelles. She had been refloated by 14 June. |

== 12 June ==
List of shipwrecks: 12 June 1842
| Ship | State | Description |
|---|---|---|
| Look-in | (United Kingdom of Great Britain and Ireland) New Zealand | The schooner was wrecked in the Waimea River near Nelson. Her crew were rescued. She was later taken into Nelson for repairs. |
| Washington | United Kingdom | The ship struck the Horn Reef, in the Baltic Sea and was abandoned with the loss of a crew member. She was on a voyage from Goole, Yorkshire to Pillau, Prussia. |

== 13 June ==
List of shipwrecks: 13 June 1842
| Ship | State | Description |
|---|---|---|
| Reindeer | United States | The fishing schooner was lost in the lost at Newport, Rhode Island. Crew saved. |

== 15 June ==
List of shipwrecks: 15 June 1842
| Ship | State | Description |
|---|---|---|
| Ann | United Kingdom | The ship ran aground on a reef in the Brazilian Straits. She was on a voyage from Canton, China to London. She was refloated the next day and taken into Samboangan, Spanish East Indies. |
| Bloom | United Kingdom | The ship was wrecked near Lemvig, Denmark with the loss of two of her crew. She was on a voyage from Pillau, Prussia to Plymouth, Devon. |
| Louisa | United States | The ship was damaged by fire at Marseille, Bouches-du-Rhône, France. |

== 16 June ==
List of shipwrecks: 16 June 1842
| Ship | State | Description |
|---|---|---|
| Betty | United Kingdom | The ship was driven ashore and damaged on Anholt, Denmark. She was on a voyage from Wismar to London. Betty was refloated and put into Copenhagen, Denmark. |
| Bloom | United Kingdom | The ship was wrecked near Lemvig, Denmark with the loss of two of her crew. She was on a voyage from Pillau, Prussia to Plymouth, Devon. |
| Brown | United Kingdom | The ship was driven ashore and wrecked at Faial Island, Azores. Her crew were rescued. |

== 17 June ==
List of shipwrecks: 17 June 1842
| Ship | State | Description |
|---|---|---|
| Jean and Mary | United Kingdom | The ship was driven ashore and damaged at Kirkcudbright. She was refloated on 16 July and taken into Kirkcudbright for repairs. |
| Maid of the Mist | United Kingdom | The steamship was driven ashore on Campobello Island, New Brunswick, British North America. She was on a voyage from Saint John, New Brunswick to Eastport, Maine, United States. She was refloated and completed her voyage. |
| Maria Johanna | Netherlands | The ship was driven ashore on Læsø, Denmark. She was on a voyage from Narva, Russia to Amsterdam, North Holland. Maria Johanna was refloated and put into Helsingør, Denmark. |

== 18 June ==
List of shipwrecks: 18 June 1842
| Ship | State | Description |
|---|---|---|
| Adelaide | United Kingdom | The ship was destroyed by fire at Bombay, India. |
| Farmer | United Kingdom | The sloop was severely damaged by fire at Eyemouth, Berwickshire. She was on a voyage from Sunderland, County Durham to Stonehaven, Aberdeenshire. |
| Jane | United Kingdom | The ship was wrecked on the Morant Keys. She was on a voyage from India to Kingston, Jamaica. |
| Simpson | United Kingdom | The ship was driven ashore in the Dardanelles. She was on a voyage from Kertch, Russia to Falmouth, Cornwall or Cork. She was refloated and resumed her voyage. |
| Tiger | (United Kingdom of Great Britain and Ireland) Isle of Man | The schooner departed from Newcastle upon Tyne, Northumberland for Ramsey. No further trace, presumed foundered with the loss of all hands. |

== 19 June ==
List of shipwrecks: 19 June 1842
| Ship | State | Description |
|---|---|---|
| Ontario | United Kingdom | The brig was wrecked on a reef in the Mediterranean Sea 30 nautical miles (56 km) west of the Arab's Tower, Alexandria, Egypt. Her crew survived. She was on a voyage from Alexandria to Falmouth, Cornwall or Hull, Yorkshire. |

== 20 June ==
List of shipwrecks: 20 June 1842
| Ship | State | Description |
|---|---|---|
| Eleonore | Russia | The ship departed from Riga for Helsingør, Denmark and Antwerp, Belgium. No further trace, presumed foundered in the Baltic Sea with the loss of all hands. |
| Margaret Hogg | United Kingdom | The ship ran aground on the Gingerbread Ground, off the Bahamas and was severely damaged. She was on a voyage from Montevideo, Uruguay to Havana, Cuba. She was refloated and put into Nassau, Bahamas. |

== 21 June ==
List of shipwrecks: 21 June 1842
| Ship | State | Description |
|---|---|---|
| Courier | United Kingdom | The ship was driven ashore at Métis, Province of Canada, British North America. She was on a voyage from Montreal, Province of Canada to Liverpool, Lancashire. She was refloated on 25 July and taken into Quebec City, Province of Canada. |
| Marianne | United Kingdom | The ship was sighted in the Øresund whilst on a voyage from Stettin to London. No further trace, presumed foundered with the loss of all hands. |
| Sarah | United Kingdom | The ship was driven ashore and wrecked near The Lizard, Cornwall. Her crew were rescued. She was on a voyage from Falmouth, Cornwall to Newport, Monmouthshire. |

== 22 June ==
List of shipwrecks: 22 June 1842
| Ship | State | Description |
|---|---|---|
| Jefferson | United States | The 377-ton Nantucket ship was lost on Atooi, with 2,480 barrels of sperm oil and 80 barrels of whale oil. |
| Pilot | United Kingdom | The brig sank in the Atlantic Ocean 60 nautical miles (110 km) west of Tory Island, County Donegal. Twelve crew survived. She was on a voyage from Cardiff, Glamorgan to Havana, Cuba |

== 23 June ==
List of shipwrecks: 23 June 1842
| Ship | State | Description |
|---|---|---|
| Carrington | (United Kingdom of Great Britain and Ireland) New South Wales | The coaster was wrecked at Port Stephen. |
| Good Intention | United Kingdom | The ship was driven onto the North Tail, in the Bristol Channel. She was on a voyage from Barnstaple, Devon to Swansea, Glamorgan. She was refloated on 9 July. |
| Penrhyn | United Kingdom | The ship was driven ashore at Walney Island, Lancashire. |

== 24 June ==
List of shipwrecks: 24 June 1842
| Ship | State | Description |
|---|---|---|
| Africano | Portugal | The ship was driven ashore and wrecked at Pernambuco, Brazil. She was on a voyage from Pernambuco to Lisbon. |
| Blossom | (United Kingdom of Great Britain and Ireland) New Zealand | The whaling ship was driven onto rocks and wrecked by a squall in the Chatham Islands. All hands were saved. |
| Jean and Mary | United Kingdom | The ship was driven ashore and wrecked at Kirkcudbright. |
| Phoenix | (United Kingdom of Great Britain and Ireland) Cape Colony | The paddle steamer ran aground on Bonavista, Cape Verde Islands. She was refloated and put into Porto Praia for repairs. |
| Renown | United Kingdom | The ship was severely damaged by fire whilst on a voyage from Sydney, New South Wales to Liverpool, Lancashire. The fire was extinguished on 28 June. |

== 25 June ==
List of shipwrecks: 25 June 1842
| Ship | State | Description |
|---|---|---|
| Psyche | United Kingdom | The barque was driven ashore at Corkbeg, County Cork. She was refloated. |

== 26 June ==
List of shipwrecks: 26 June 1842
| Ship | State | Description |
|---|---|---|
| Caroline | United Kingdom | The ship was driven ashore at Havre de Grâce, Seine-Inférieure, France. She was on a voyage from Truro, Cornwall to Havre de Grâce. |
| John and Jane | United Kingdom | The ship ran aground on the Thorpe Rocks, off the coast of Suffolk. She was on a voyage from Sunderland, County Durham to London. She was refloated and resumed her voyage. |
| Mary and Ann | United Kingdom | The ship was driven ashore and wrecked on the coast of Denmark with the loss of one of her six crew. She was on a voyage from Hartlepool, County Durham to Pillau, Prussia. |

== 27 June ==
List of shipwrecks: 27 June 1842
| Ship | State | Description |
|---|---|---|
| Borea | United Kingdom | The ship was wrecked at Helsingør, Denmark. She was on a voyage from Hull, Yorkshire to Christianstadt, Sweden. |
| Copeland | United Kingdom | The ship struck the Stroom Rock and was consequently beached on "Thwart-the-way Island" with assistance from Peruvian (United Kingdom). She floated off, capsized and sank in the Strait of Sunda. Copeland was on a voyage from Liverpool, Lancashire to China. |
| Sophia | Denmark | The ship was driven ashore on Dragør. She was refloated on 3 July. |

== 28 June ==
List of shipwrecks: 28 June 1842
| Ship | State | Description |
|---|---|---|
| Amelia | United Kingdom | The ship ran aground off the Rabbit Islands, Ottoman Empire. She was refloated with assistance from HMS Vanguard (Royal Navy). |

== 29 June ==
List of shipwrecks: 29 June 1842
| Ship | State | Description |
|---|---|---|
| Elizabeth | United Kingdom | The ship was wrecked in the Magdalen Island, Nova Scotia, British North America. |
| Pactolus | France | The ship ran aground at the mouth of the Mississippi River. She was on a voyage from New Orleans, Louisiana, United States to Havre de Grâce, Seine-Inférieure, France. |
| Slaters | United Kingdom | The ship was driven ashore near the Domesnes Lighthouse, Norway. She was on a voyage from Hull, Yorkshire to Libava, Courland Governorate. She was refloated on 2 July and resumed her voyage. |

== 30 June ==
List of shipwrecks: 30 June 1842
| Ship | State | Description |
|---|---|---|
| Good Design | United Kingdom | The schooner ran aground on the Buxey Sand, in the North Sea off the coast of Essex. She was refloated but consequently sank. Good Design was on a voyage from Königsberg, Prussia or Danzig to London. She was refloated and on 5 July taken into Harwich, Essex. |
| Kate | United Kingdom | The ship was driven ashore at Thisted, Denmark. Her crew were rescued. She was on a voyage from Sunderland, County Durham to Swinemünde, Prussia. She had become a wreck by 21 July. |
| Mary Ann | United Kingdom | The ship was driven ashore and wrecked near Lemvig, Denmark with the loss of a crew member. She was on a voyage from Hartlepool, County Durham to Pillau, Prussia. |

== Unknown date ==
List of shipwrecks: Unknown date in June 1842
| Ship | State | Description |
|---|---|---|
| Aerolite | United Kingdom | The ship was wrecked at "Muñoz", Spain. Her crew were rescued. She was on a voyage from A Coruña, Spain to Lisbon, Portugal. |
| Ann Liffey | United Kingdom | The barque struck an iceberg in the Atlantic Ocean and was abandoned. All on board were rescued by the barque Oscar (United Kingdom). |
| Ariel | (United Kingdom of Great Britain and Ireland) New Zealand | The schooner was driven ashore in Hawke Bay before 11 June. Her crew were rescued. She was later refloated. |
| Assam | India | The steamship was reported missing, presumed foundered before 8 June. |
| Caroline | United Kingdom | The ship was driven ashore at Havre de Grâce, Seine-Inférieure, France. She was refloated on 1 July. |
| Devonshire | (United Kingdom of Great Britain and Ireland) Swan River Colony | The schooner was wrecked on or before 18 June with some loss of life. She was on a voyage from Perth to Bunbury, Swan River Colony. |
| Edward | United Kingdom | The ship was abandoned in the Atlantic Ocean. Her crew were rescued by Aurelian (United Kingdom). |
| Ellen | United Kingdom | The ship was driven ashore on "Cross Island". She was later refloated and taken into Helsingør, where she arrived on 15 June. |
| Enterprise (or Enterprize) | (United Kingdom of Great Britain and Ireland) Van Diemen's Land | In mid-June, the schooner ran aground during a trip from Wellington to Wanganui, New Zealand, at the mouth of the Wangahiahu (i.e., Whangaehu River), which the captain had mistaken for the larger Whanganui River, several miles to the northwest. |
| Herald | (Ottoman Empire) Egypt | The steamship sprang a leak and was run ashore 30 nautical miles (56 km) east of Cape Finisterre, Spain. Her crew were rescued. she was on a voyage from London, United Kingdom to Alexandria. |
| Kate | United Kingdom | The ship was damaged by fire at Bombay, India on 3 or 10 June. |
| Marquis of Douro | United Kingdom | The ship was driven ashore on "Cross Island". She was later refloated and taken into Helsingør, where she arrived on 15 June. |
| Stephen | United Kingdom | The brig was abandoned in ice in the Atlantic Ocean. Her crew were rescued by John Romilly (United Kingdom). Stephen was on a voyage from Newcastle upon Tyne, Northumberland to Pictou, Nova Scotia, British North America. |
| Thomas and Robert | United Kingdom | The ship was driven ashore on Saaremaa, Russia. She was on a voyage from Newcastle upon Tyne to Saint Petersburg. She was refloated and resumed her voyage, arriving at Saint Petersburg on 16 June. |
| Time | United Kingdom | The ship sank at Bristol, Gloucestershire. She was refloated on 10 June. |
| Waterwitch | United Kingdom | The ship was lost whilst on a voyage from Calcutta, India to Chian. |
