= List of shipwrecks in April 1823 =

The list of shipwrecks in April 1823 includes all ships sunk, foundered, grounded, or otherwise lost during April 1823.

== 1 April ==
List of shipwrecks: 1 April 1823
Ship	State	Description
Mary	United Kingdom	The ship was wrecked south of "Burral Island". She was on a voyage from Sicily to Belfast, County Antrim.
HNLMS Zeepaard	Netherlands Navy	The corvette was wrecked in Algoa Bay or Saldanha Bay, Africa, with the loss of at least seven of her 180 crew. Tiger (United Kingdom) rescued 156 survivors.

== 2 April ==
List of shipwrecks: 2 April 1823
Ship	State	Description
Agatha	France	The ship was driven ashore near Sahurs, Seine-Inférieure.
Barbara	United Kingdom	The ship was driven ashore at Troon, Ayrshire. She was on a voyage from Troon to Dumfries. Barbara was refloated in late April.
George	United Kingdom	The ship was driven ashore at Southport, Lancashire. Her crew were rescued. She was on a voyage from Youghal, County Cork, to Liverpool, Lancashire.
Kinloch	United Kingdom	The ship was in collision with a brig off Lamlash, Isle of Arran and foundered. Her crew were rescued by Vine (United Kingdom).
Lively	United Kingdom	The ship was driven ashore near Peel, Isle of Man. Her crew were rescued. She was on a voyage from an Irish port to Preston, Lancashire.
Phillippa	United Kingdom	The ship ran aground at the Birling Gap, Sussex. Her crew were rescued. She was on a voyage from Bristol, Gloucestershire, to London. Philippa broke up the next day.
Vriendschap	Netherlands	The ship was wrecked on the west coast of Bermuda.
William and James	United Kingdom	The ship was driven ashore and wrecked at Ayr. Her crew were rescued. She was on a voyage from Glasgow, Renfrewshire, to Waterford.

== 3 April ==
List of shipwrecks: 3 April 1823
Ship	State	Description
HMS Cockburn	Royal Navy	The schooner was driven ashore and wrecked in Simon's Bay, Cape Colony. Her crew survived.
Marie Josephine	France	The ship was driven ashore near Bardouville, Seine-Inférieure. She was on a voyage from Bordeaux, Gironde, to Rouen, Seine-Inférieure.

== 4 April ==
List of shipwrecks: 4 April 1823
Ship	State	Description
Andate	United Kingdom	The ship was wrecked in the Farne Islands, Northumberland. Her crew were rescued. She was on a voyage from Montrose, Forfarshire, to South Shields, County Durham.
Benjamin	France	The ship was driven ashore near Bardouville, Seine-Inférieure. She was on a voyage from Marennes, Charente-Maritime to Rouen, Seine-Inférieure.
Chumco	Spain	The ship was destroyed by fire at Veracruz, Mexico.
Hunter	United Kingdom	The ship struck the Chevrier Bank and was abandoned by her crew. She was on a voyage from Bristol, Gloucestershire, to Bordeaux, Gironde, France. Hunter subsequently came ashore near Royan, Charente-Maritime, France. She was later refloated and taken in to Bordeaux.
Nary Ann	(United Kingdom of Great Britain and Ireland) British North America	The schooner was wrecked on Brier Island, Nova Scotia. Her crew were rescued.
William and Mary	United Kingdom	The ship struck a sunken wreck in the North Sea off Aldeburgh, Suffolk, and foundered. Her crew were rescued by Jane. She was on a voyage from Sunderland, County Durham, to Margate, Kent.

== 5 April ==
List of shipwrecks: 5 April 1823
Ship	State	Description
Clarence	United Kingdom	The ship was lost near Thisted, Denmark. her crew were rescued. She was on a voyage from Copenhagen, Denmark, to London.
Mary	United Kingdom	The ship foundered in St Bride's Bay.

== 7 April ==
List of shipwrecks: 7 April 1823
Ship	State	Description
Ulysses	United Kingdom	The ship was wrecked on the coast of County Kerry.
Zephyr	United States	The schooner was driven ashore near Cape Cod, Massachusetts.

== 8 April ==
List of shipwrecks: 8 April 1823
Ship	State	Description
Commerce	United Kingdom	The ship ran aground in the Savannah River. She was on a voyage from Savannah, Georgia, United States, to Greenock, Renfrewshire.
Courier	United Kingdom	The ship capsized at Liverpool, Lancashire. She was on a voyage from Rio de Janeiro, Brazil, to Liverpool. Courier was later refloated and beached.
Dolphin	United Kingdom	The ship was wrecked at Dieppe, Seine-Inférieure, France. She was on a voyage from Sunderland, County Durham, to Dieppe.
Faith	United Kingdom	The ship ran aground in the Savannah River. She was on a voyage from Savannah to Jamaica.
Maria	United Kingdom	The ship was wrecked on the Shipwash Sand, in the North Sea. Her crew were rescued. She was on a voyage from Aberdeen to London.

== 9 April ==
List of shipwrecks: 9 April 1823
Ship	State	Description
Margaret	United Kingdom	The ship was destroyed by fire in the North Sea off Hamburg. She was on a voyage from Hamburg to London.
St. Etienne	France	The ship was lost off Saint-Vaast-la-Hougue, Manche. She was on a voyage from Weymouth, Dorset, United Kingdom, to Rouen, Seine Maritime.
Suspicious	United Kingdom	The ship was wrecked near Ilfracombe, Devon.

== 11 April ==
List of shipwrecks: 11 April 1823
Ship	State	Description
Warre	United Kingdom	The ship was driven ashore at Memel, Prussia.

== 12 April ==
List of shipwrecks: 12 April 1823
Ship	State	Description
Bicton	United Kingdom	The ship was in collision with USS Constitution (United States Navy) in the Mediterranean Sea and sank with the loss of her captain. She was on a voyage from Livorno. Grand Duchy of Tuscany to Plymouth, Devon.
Dromo	United States	The ship ran aground and capsized in the River Liffey. She was on a voyage from New York to Dublin, United Kingdom.
Graciosa	Spain	The schooner was lost on the "New Shoal". Her crew were rescued by Ana (Netherlands). She was on a voyage from Cádiz to Truxillo.
Warre	United Kingdom	The ship was lost at Memel, Prussia.

== 14 April ==
List of shipwrecks: 14 April 1823
Ship	State	Description
Pomona	United Kingdom	The ship foundered in the Atlantic Ocean. Her crew were rescued by Solon (United Kingdom). She was on a voyage from London to Pará, Brazil.

== 15 April ==
List of shipwrecks: 15 April 1823
Ship	State	Description
New Hope	United Kingdom	The ship was driven ashore and damaged at Memel, Prussia. She was on a voyage from Scarborough, Yorkshire, to Memel. New Hope was later refloated. She arrived at Memel on 9 May.

== 16 April ==
List of shipwrecks: 16 April 1823
Ship	State	Description
Apollo	United Kingdom	The ship was wrecked at Green Point, Cape of Good Hope with the loss of a crew member. She was on a voyage from Bengal and Madras, India, to London.
Venus	United Kingdom	The ship was in collision with Union (United Kingdom) in the North Sea off Mundesley, Norfolk, and sank with the loss of two of her five crew. Union rescued the survivors.

== 17 April ==
List of shipwrecks: 17 April 1823
Ship	State	Description
Biene	Prussia	The ship was driven ashore north of "Toreko". She was on a voyage from Stettin to London, United Kingdom.
Hastings	United Kingdom	The brig was destroyed by fire off Padang, Netherlands East Indies.
Janet	United Kingdom	The ship was run down and sunk in the North Sea by Charles (United Kingdom) with the loss of her captain. She was on a voyage from Perth to London.
Martha	United Kingdom	The ship was driven ashore and wrecked at Memel, Prussia. Her crew were rescued. She was on a voyage from South Shields, County Durham, to Memel.

== 19 April ==
List of shipwrecks: 19 April 1823
Ship	State	Description
Ant	United Kingdom	The ship was wrecked on Mort Point, Devon. She was on a voyage from Youghal, County Cork, to Cardiff, Glamorgan.
Mary & Kitty	United Kingdom	The sloop was run down and sunk by Tiger (United Kingdom). Her crew were rescued.
Scipio	United Kingdom	The ship was lost near Cherbourg, Seine-Inférieure. Her crew were rescued. She was on a voyage from London to Virginia, United States.

== 20 April ==
List of shipwrecks: 20 April 1823
Ship	State	Description
Gambler	United Kingdom	The ship was wrecked on the Heaps Sand, in the North Sea off Wivenhoe, Essex.

== 22 April ==
List of shipwrecks: 22 April 1823
Ship	State	Description
Maria Francisca	Netherlands	The ship was wrecked on the Hinder Sandbank, in the North Sea off the coast of South Holland. Her crew survived. She was on a voyage from Hull, Yorkshire, United Kingdom, to Rotterdam, South Holland.

== 23 April ==
List of shipwrecks: 23 April 1823
Ship	State	Description
Anthony Sterry	United Kingdom	The ship was wrecked on the Shivering Sand, in the North Sea off Margate, Kent. She was on a voyage from the South Seas to London.
Berentina Maria	Prussia	The ship was driven ashore and wrecked at Memel. Her crew were rescued. She was on a voyage from Stavanger, Norway, to Memel.
Fame	United Kingdom	The whaler was destroyed by fire in Deer Sound, Orkney Islands. Her crew survived.
Smart	United Kingdom	The schooner was sunk by ice 10 nautical miles (19 km) off Domesnes, Norway. Her crew survived. She was on a voyage from Liverpool, Lancashire, to Riga, Russia.

== 24 April ==
List of shipwrecks: 24 April 1823
Ship	State	Description
Lively	United Kingdom	The ship was driven ashore and wrecked at Deal, Kent. Her crew were rescued.

== 25 April ==
List of shipwrecks: 25 April 1823
Ship	State	Description
Vriendschap	Netherlands	The ship ran aground off Domesnes, Norway, and was wrecked. Her crew survived. She was on a voyage from Amsterdam, North Holland, to Riga, Russian Empire.

== 26 April ==
List of shipwrecks: 26 April 1823
Ship	State	Description
Avon	United Kingdom	The schooner foundered in the Atlantic Ocean 3 leagues (9 nautical miles (17 km)) off Padstow, Cornwall. Her four crew were rescued by Richmond (United Kingdom). She was on a voyage from Neath, Glamorgan, to Dartmouth, Devon.
Berentina Maria	Norway	The ship was driven ashore and wrecked at Memel, Prussia.
Eliza	United Kingdom	The yacht was driven ashore and wrecked at Mizen Head, County Cork. Her crew were rescued.
Hero	United Kingdom	The ship was driven ashore at Cartmel, Cumberland.

== 27 April ==
List of shipwrecks: 27 April 1823
Ship	State	Description
Betsey	(United Kingdom of Great Britain and Ireland) Jersey	The ship was lost at St. Mary's, Gambia.
Cossack	United States	The schooner was wrecked on the west coast of New Zealand. The ship had called in at the Hokianga Harbour for provisions, but embarked at low tide when the ship was barely able to navigate the channel and unable to cope with an incoming tide. The ship hit a sandbar and went ashore stern first. The crew were all saved with the help of local Hokianga Māori. Some referenced place the wreck in Sumatra rather than New Zealand.

== 29 April ==
List of shipwrecks: 29 April 1823
Ship	State	Description
Fremling	Hamburg	The ship was wrecked on Scharhörn. She was on a voyage from Cette, Hérault, France, to Hamburg.
Isabella	United Kingdom	The sloop collided with Mary (United Kingdom) in the River Mersey at Liverpool, Lancashire, and sank. Her crew were rescued. She was on a voyage from Newry, County Down, to Liverpool.

== Unknown date ==
List of shipwrecks: Unknown date in April 1823
Ship	State	Description
Churruca	Spain	The ship was destroyed by fire at Morro Castle, Cuba, in early April. She was on a voyage from Cádiz to Veracruz, Mexico.
Courier	United Kingdom	The ship ran aground near Antwerp, Netherlands. She was on a voyage from Rio de Janeiro, Brazil, to Antwerp.
Courier du Fort Dauphin	France	The ship foundered off Madagascar.
Dromo	United States	The ship ran aground in the River Liffey at Dublin, United Kingdom, and was wrecked. She was on a voyage from New York to Dublin.
Elizabeth Joanna	United Kingdom	The ship was wrecked near Port Isaac before 21 April. She was on a voyage from Batavia, Netherlands East Indies, to Rotterdam, South Holland, Netherlands.
Elizabeth & Jane	United States	The ship was severely damaged on a reef off the Fox Islands, Maine, on or before 12 April. She was later taken in to Harpswell, Maine, by Merritt (United States).
George IV	United Kingdom	The ship departed from Constantinople, Ottoman Empire, for Syra, Greece. No further trace, presumed foundered in the Mediterranean Sea with the loss of all hands.
Jane	United States	The ship was wrecked near Barcelona, Spain, in early April with the loss of all but three of her crew. She was on a voyage from Gibraltar to Barcelona.
Kekke	Norway	The ship was lost near the Faroe Islands. She was on a voyage from Trondheim to Barcelona, Spain.
Palermo	France	The ship foundered in the Bay of Biscay of the mouth of the Gironde.
Scipio	United Kingdom	The ship was lost near Cherbourg, Seine-Inférieure, France. Her crew were rescued. She was on a voyage from London to Virginia, United States.
