= List of shipwrecks in September 1837 =

The list of shipwrecks in September 1837 includes ships sunk, foundered, wrecked, grounded, or otherwise lost during September 1837.

== 1 September ==
List of shipwrecks: 1 September 1837
Ship	State	Description
Cyrus	United States	The barque was driven ashore and sank in the Hillsborough Inlet. Her crew survived. She was on a voyage from New Orleans, Louisiana to Liverpool, Lancashire, United Kingdom.
Eliza	United Kingdom	The ship was wrecked at Port Natal, Africa. Her crew were rescued
George Henry	United Kingdom	The ship ran aground on Pickle's Reef. She was on a voyage from Jamaica to Saint John, New Brunswick, British North America.

== 2 September ==
List of shipwrecks: 2 September 1837
Ship	State	Description
Agnes	United Kingdom	The ship was driven ashore at Donaghadee, County Down.
Briton	United Kingdom	The collier, a brig, was holed by an anchor and sank in the River Thames at Deptford, Kent.
Eagle	United Kingdom	The ship was driven ashore in the River Ythan.

== 3 September ==
List of shipwrecks: 3 September 1837
Ship	State	Description
Jane	United Kingdom	The ship was driven ashore at Mockbeggar, Cheshire. She was on a voyage from Liverpool, Lancashire to Amsterdam, North Holland, Netherlands.
Janet	United Kingdom	The ship, which had capsized on 21 August with the loss of two of her crew, was abandoned in the Atlantic Ocean. Her eleven surviving crew were rescued by Emigrant (United States). She was on a voyage from British Honduras to London.

== 4 September ==
List of shipwrecks: 4 September 1837
Ship	State	Description
Eleanora	France	The ship foundered in the North Sea. Her crew were rescued. She was on a voyage from Brest, Finistère to Memel, Prussia.
Hope	United Kingdom	The ship was driven ashore 5 nautical miles (9.3 km) west of Boulogne-sur-Mer, Pas-de-Calais, France. She was later refloated and resumed her voyage.
Nymph	United Kingdom	The ship was driven ashore on the Abertay Sands. She was on a voyage from Newcastle upon Tyne to Dundee, Forfarshire. She was refloated the next day.
Padang	Netherlands	The brig was wrecked on the Goodwin Sands, Kent, United Kingdom with the loss of five of the fifteen people on board. She was on a voyage from Amsterdam, North Holland to Batavia, Netherlands East Indies.

== 5 September ==
List of shipwrecks: 5 September 1837
Ship	State	Description
Apollo	United Kingdom	The steamship was in collision with Monarch (United Kingdom) and sank in the River Thames at Gravesend, Kent with the loss of three lives. She was on a voyage from Great Yarmouth, Norfolk to London.
Ida	Hamburg	The ship was run down and sunk in the English Channel off Start Point, Devon, United Kingdom by Mary Ann (United Kingdom) with the loss of four of her crew. Ida was on a voyage from Rio de Janeiro, Brazil to Hamburg.
Mary	United Kingdom	The ship was abandoned in the Atlantic Ocean. Her crew were rescued. She was on a voyage from New Orleans, Louisiana to Barbados.

== 6 September ==
List of shipwrecks: 6 September 1837
Ship	State	Description
Amelia Hopper	United Kingdom	The ship was wrecked on South Bimini, Bahamas. She was on a voyage from Cuba to Nassau, Bahamas and Liverpool, Lancashire.
Placidia	United Kingdom	The brig ran aground on the Maplin Sand, in the North Sea off the coast of Essex. She was on a voyage from Newcastle upon Tyne, Northumberland to London. Placidia was refloated on 8 September and resumed her voyage.

== 7 September ==
List of shipwrecks: 7 September 1837
Ship	State	Description
Augusta	United States	The ship was abandoned in the Atlantic Ocean. She was on a voyage from Cádiz, Spain to Boston, Massachusetts.
Equity	United Kingdom	The ship was wrecked near Stornoway, Isle of Lewis, Outer Hebrides. She was on a voyage from Arkhangelsk, Russia to Bristol, Gloucestershire.
Thomas and Ann	United Kingdom	The ship was driven ashore and wrecked near Hoylake, Lancashire. Her crew were rescued. She was on a voyage from Poole, Dorset to Runcorn, Cheshire.

== 8 September ==
List of shipwrecks: 8 September 1837
Ship	State	Description
Eleanora	France	The ship sprang a leak and foundered. Her crew were rescued. She was on a voyage from Brest, Finistère to Memel, Prussia.

== 9 September ==
List of shipwrecks: 9 September 1837
Ship	State	Description
Belize	United Kingdom	The ship was driven on the south west point of Anticosti Island, Lower Canada, British North America. She was on a voyage from Quebec City, Lower Canada to Sligo. Belize was later refloated and put back to Quebec City in a very leaky condition.
Harmonie	United Kingdom	The ship was severely damaged at Newport, Monmouthshire.

== 10 September ==
List of shipwrecks: 10 September 1837
Ship	State	Description
Cœur de Lion	United Kingdom	The ship was driven ashore and damaged in Dundrum Bay with the loss of five of her crew and two rescuers. She was on a voyage from Liverpool, Lancashire to Quebec City, Lower Canada, British North America.Cœur de Lion was later refloated and taken into Killough Bay.

== 11 September ==
List of shipwrecks: 11 September 1837
Ship	State	Description
John George Elphinstone	United Kingdom	The schooner foundered off Ballycotton, County Cork. She was on a voyage from Newcastle upon Tyne, Northumberland to Cork.

== 12 September ==
List of shipwrecks: 12 September 1837
Ship	State	Description
Charlotte	United Kingdom	The ship was driven ashore in Bootle Bay. She was on a voyage from Quebec City, Lower Canada, British North America to Liverpool, Lancashire.
Grecian	United Kingdom	The ship was driven ashore in Tramore Bay. She was on a voyage from Nevis to Liverpool, Lancashire. Grecian was refloated on 15 September and towed into Waterford.

== 13 September ==
List of shipwrecks: 13 September 1837
Ship	State	Description
General Gascoyne	United Kingdom	The ship was wrecked on Burbo Point with the loss of a passenger. Survivors were rescued by the steam tug Eleanor (United Kingdom). General Gascoyne was on a voyage from Quebec City, Lower Canada, British North America to Liverpool, Lancashire.
Gustave	Danzig	The ship foundered off Domesnes, Norway. Her crew survived. She was on a voyage from Danzig to Hull, Yorkshire, United Kingdom.
Mayflower	United Kingdom	The sloop was wrecked at the mouth of the Voryd River, Wales. At least one crew member survived.

== 14 September ==
List of shipwrecks: 14 September 1837
Ship	State	Description
Cambrian	United Kingdom	The ship was driven ashore in Chappel Bay. She was later refloated and taken into Milford Haven, Pembrokeshire.
Marshall Blucher	United Kingdom	The ship capsized at Newport, Monmouthshire.
Welcome	United Kingdom	The ship was driven ashore and wrecked at Thisted, Denmark. Her crew were rescued. She was on a voyage from Saint Petersburg, Russia to Devonport, Devon.

== 15 September ==
List of shipwrecks: 15 September 1837
Ship	State	Description
Don Juan	United Kingdom	The P&O paddle steamer ran aground at Tarifa Point and was wrecked. All on board were rescued. She was on a voyage from Gibraltar to London.

== 16 September ==
List of shipwrecks: 16 September 1837
Ship	State	Description
Cecilia	Stettin	The ship sank off Ameland, Friesland, Netherlands. Her crew were rescued. She was on a voyage from Stettin to Koog aan de Zaan, North Holland, Netherlands.
Pennsylvania	United States	The schooner capsized in the Atlantic Ocean with the loss of 25 of the 27 people on board. The survivors were rescued on 20 September by Amelia (United Kingdom).
Twist	United Kingdom	The ship was driven ashore and damaged at Hull, Yorkshire. She was on a voyage from Saint Petersburg, Russia to Hull. Twist was later refloated and taken into Hull.

== 17 September ==
List of shipwrecks: 17 September 1837
Ship	State	Description
Carolina	Brazil	The ship struck rocks at Montevideo, with the loss of six of her crew and several passengers. She was on a voyage from Rio de Janeiro to Buenos Aires, Argentina.
Cumberland	United Kingdom	The schooner was driven ashore and wrecked at the Pile Lighthouse, Lancashire with the loss of three lives. She was on a voyage from Saint Petersburg, Russia to Lancaster, Lancashire. The wreck was towed into the Belfast Lough on 29 September by HMRC Diligence ( Board of Customs).
Pera	United Kingdom	The ship was driven ashore near Pelican Point, in the Gulf of Smyrna. She was on a voyage from London to Smyrna, Ottoman Empire. Pera was refloated the next day with assistance from HMS Tribune (Royal Navy).
Soloman	United Kingdom	The ship was driven ashore near Wells-next-the-Sea, Norfolk. She was on a voyage from Sunderland, County Durham to Wells-next-the-Sea. Soloman was later refloated and taken in to port.
Spartan	United Kingdom	The ship was lost near Pacasmayo, Peru.

== 19 September ==
List of shipwrecks: 19 September 1837
Ship	State	Description
Adventure	United Kingdom	The ship was lost off Lobos Island, Canary Islands. Her crew were rescued. She was on a voyage from Cádiz, Spain to Montevideo, Uruguay.
Laurel	United Kingdom	The ship was driven ashore and wrecked at Robert's Head, County Cork. Her crew were rescued. She was on a voyage from Kinsale to Cork.

== 20 September ==
List of shipwrecks: 20 September 1837
Ship	State	Description
Liverpool	United Kingdom	The ship sank at Scharhörn. She was on a voyage from Rio de Janeiro, Brazil to Hamburg. She was later refloated and resumed her voyage.
Lord Russel, Two Brothers	United Kingdom	Lord Russel collided with the smack Two Brothers off Aberavon, Glamorgan. Both vessels were beached. Lord Russel was later refloated and resumed her voyage.
Maria	United Kingdom	The ship was abandoned in the Atlantic Ocean. She was on a voyage from British Honduras to Hull, Yorkshire.

== 21 September ==
List of shipwrecks: 21 September 1837
Ship	State	Description
Emerald	United Kingdom	The ship sprang a leak and foundered. Her crew were rescued. She was on a voyage from Havana, Cuba to London.
Juliana Wilhelmine	Stettin	The ship foundered off Belle Île, Morbihan, France. Her crew were rescued. She was on a voyage from Nantes, Loire-Inférieure, France to Stettin.
Tennant	United Kingdom	The ship was driven ashore at Redcar, Yorkshire. She was on a voyage from Stockton-on-Tees, County Durham to London.
HMS Terror	Royal Navy	The research ship, a converted Vesuvius-class bomb vessel, was beached on the coast of Ireland.

== 23 September ==
List of shipwrecks: 23 September 1837
Ship	State	Description
Grasshopper	United States	The ship was wrecked on Cape Henelopen, Delaware. She was on a voyage from Philadelphia, Pennsylvania to Halifax, Nova Scotia, British North America.

== 24 September ==
List of shipwrecks: 24 September 1837
Ship	State	Description
Jeune Estelle	France	The ship was driven ashore at Guernsey, Channel Islands. She was on a voyage from Buenos Aires, Argentina to Bordeaux, Gironde. Jeune Estelle was refloated and taken into Guernsey.
Koning der Nederlander	Netherlands	The brig was wrecked on the Goodwin Sands, Kent, United Kingdom with the loss of four of her crew. She was on a voyage from Amsterdam, North Holland to Batavia, Netherlands East Indies.
Provens Minde	Sweden	The ship was driven ashore at Harwich, Essex, United Kingdom. She was on a voyage from Sundsvall to Cherbourg, Seine-Inférieure, France.
Supply	United Kingdom	The ship was driven ashore and wrecked on the Nore. She was on a voyage from Saint Petersburg, Russia to London.

== 25 September ==
List of shipwrecks: 25 September 1837
Ship	State	Description
Bristol Packet	United Kingdom	The ship was beached at Fowey, Cornwall.
Germ	United Kingdom	The ship was abandoned in the Atlantic Ocean off Cape Hatteras, North Carolina. Four of her crew were rescued. She was on a voyage from Jamaica to Saint John, New Brunswick, British North America.
Medora	United Kingdom	The ship was lost at the Río Real, Brazil. All on board were rescued. She was on a voyage from Sydney, New South Wales to London.
Supply	United Kingdom	The ship ran aground on the Nore. She was on a voyage from Saint Petersburg, Russia to London.

== 26 September ==
List of shipwrecks: 26 September 1837
Ship	State	Description
Idris	United Kingdom	The ship capsized and sank at Berbice, British Guiana. She was refloated on 2 October with assistance from Thistle (United Kingdom).

== 27 September ==
List of shipwrecks: 27 September 1837
Ship	State	Description
Cephalonia	United Kingdom	The schooner was wrecked between Figueira da Foz and Aveiro, Portugal. Her crew were rescued. She was on a voyage from Dartmouth, Devon to Cephalonia, United States of the Ionian Islands. The wreck was later burnt by the local inhabitants.
John and Grace	United Kingdom	The ship was in collision with HMS Lucifer (Royal Navy) at Dublin and was beached. She was on a voyage from Dublin to Runcorn, Cheshire.

== 28 September ==
List of shipwrecks: 28 September 1837
Ship	State	Description
Cephalonia	United Kingdom	The schooner was wrecked at Aveiro, Portugal. Her crew were rescued. She was on a voyage from Dartmouth, Devon to Cephalonia, United States of the Ionian Islands. The vessel was plundered and burnt by the local inhabitants.
Fame	United Kingdom	The ship sprang a leak and foundered off Bideford, Devon.

== 30 September ==
List of shipwrecks: 30 September 1837
Ship	State	Description
Le Landais	France	The brig was wrecked at St. Just, Cornwall, United Kingdom. All seventeen people on board were rescued.
Palladium	United Kingdom	The ship was wrecked on the east coast of Gotland, Sweden. Her crew were rescued. She was on a voyage from Narva, Russia to Dundee, Forfarshire.
Ranger	United Kingdom	The ship was discovered abandoned off Worms Head, Pembrokeshire. She was taken into the Gwendraeth Fawr.

== Unknown date ==
List of shipwrecks: Unknown date in September 1837
Ship	State	Description
Appleton	United Kingdom	The ship ran aground on Coconut Key and was damaged. She was on a voyage from Montego Bay, Jamaica to Manzanillo, Cuba.
Clarinda	(United Kingdom of Great Britain and Ireland) British North America	The ship was driven ashore and wrecked at Kingston, Jamaica between 25 and 30 September.
James	United States	The barque was abandoned in the Atlantic Ocean before 11 September. She came ashore and was wrecked on Cape Sable Island, Nova Scotia, British North America before 29 September.
Jane	United Kingdom	The ship was driven ashore and sank at Mockbeggar, Cheshire. She was on a voyage from Liverpool, Lancashire to Amsterdam, North Holland, Netherlands.
Jane	United Kingdom	The ship was driven ashore on Fish Island, British North America and was abandoned by her crew. She was on a voyage from Miramichi, New Brunswick, British North America to Cardiff, Glamorgan. Jane was later refloated and anchored in Richmond Bay.
Jessie	United Kingdom	The ship was driven ashore and wrecked at Sizewell, Suffolk before 6 September.
Kronon	Stralsund	The ship was driven ashore and severely damaged at "Farmunde". She was later refloated and taken in to Copenhagen, Denmark.
Lyra	United Kingdom	The ship was driven ashore and wrecked at Drogheda, County Louth. She was on a voyage from Liverpool to Galway.
Prince of Wales	United Kingdom	The ship was driven ashore at Wainfleet, Lincolnshire. She was later refloated and taken into Wainfleet.
Two Sisters	United Kingdom	The ship was run down by a steamship and sunk off Dungeness, Kent with the loss of three of her crew. She was on a voyage from Porto, Portugal to King's Lynn, Norfolk.
