= List of shipwrecks in August 1830 =

The list of shipwrecks in August 1830 includes ships sunk, foundered, grounded, or otherwise lost during August 1830.

== 1 August ==
List of shipwrecks: 1 August 1830
| Ship | State | Description |
|---|---|---|
| Sarah | United Kingdom | The ship departed from Jamaica for London. No further trace, presumed foundered with the loss of all hands. |
| Vittoria | United Kingdom | The ship departed from British Honduras for London. No further trace, presumed foundered with the loss of all hands. |

== 2 August ==
List of shipwrecks: 2 August 1830
| Ship | State | Description |
|---|---|---|
| Margaret | United Kingdom | The ship foundered in the Arctic Ocean (60°12′N 37°15′E). Her crew were rescued. She was on a voyage from Arkhangelsk, Russia to Liverpool, Lancashire. |

== 3 August ==
List of shipwrecks: 3 August 1830
| Ship | State | Description |
|---|---|---|
| Smirny (Смирный, 'Humble') | Imperial Russian Navy | The sloop-of-war ran aground off the Swedish coast north of sv:Tylön, in the Kattegat. She was abandoned the next day, thirteen of her crew were lost in a boat capsize. Smirny was on a voyage from Arkhangelsk to Kronstadt. She was subsequently refloated and sold. |
| Trusty | United Kingdom | The ship foundered in the Kattegat. Her crew were rescued. |

== 4 August ==
List of shipwrecks: 4 August 1830
| Ship | State | Description |
|---|---|---|
| Bee | United Kingdom | The ship foundered in the North Sea. |

== 5 August ==
List of shipwrecks: 5 August 1830
| Ship | State | Description |
|---|---|---|
| Margaretha Elizabeth | Hamburg | The ship was wrecked on the Goodwin Sands, Kent, United Kingdom. Her crew were rescued. She was on a voyage from Hamburg to Bristol, Gloucestershire, United Kingdom. |

== 6 August ==
List of shipwrecks: 6 August 1830
| Ship | State | Description |
|---|---|---|
| Mary and Ann | United Kingdom | The ship was driven ashore and wrecked at Whitby, Yorkshire. Her crew were rescued. |

== 8 August ==
List of shipwrecks: 8 August 1830
| Ship | State | Description |
|---|---|---|
| Active | United Kingdom | The ship was wrecked near Cape Canso, Nova Scotia, British North America. All on board were rescued. She was on a voyage from Demerara to Quebec City, Lower Canada, British North America. |

== 9 August ==
List of shipwrecks: 9 August 1830
| Ship | State | Description |
|---|---|---|
| Sir William Ashton | United Kingdom | The ship was wrecked in Fortune Bay, Newfoundland, British North America. |

== 11 August ==
List of shipwrecks: 11 August 1830
| Ship | State | Description |
|---|---|---|
| Dispatch | United Kingdom | The ship was sighted in the Skagerrak whilst on a voyage from Danzig, Prussia to London. No further trace, presumed foundered with the loss of all hands. |

== 12 August ==
List of shipwrecks: 12 August 1830
| Ship | State | Description |
|---|---|---|
| Cornelia | United Kingdom | The ship was driven ashore in a hurricane at St. John's, Antigua. |
| Fabricia | Spain | The ship was wrecked at Tortola. She was on a voyage from Cádiz to Havana, Cuba. |
| St. Jago | United Kingdom | The schooner was driven ashore in a hurricane at St. John's. |

== 14 August ==
List of shipwrecks: 14 August 1830
| Ship | State | Description |
|---|---|---|
| Hector | United Kingdom | The ship capsized and sank in the North Sea off Sizewell, Suffolk with the loss of two of her crew. |
| Helen | United Kingdom | The brig was sighted in the Skaggerak whilst on her maiden voyage, from Dundee, Forfarshire to Riga, Russia. No further trace, presumed foundered with the loss of all hands. |
| Hope | United Kingdom | The ship was wrecked on the Swine Bottoms, in the North Sea off Helsingør, Denmark. |
| Kleine Lidia | Kingdom of Hanover | The ship was wrecked at Thisted, Denmark. She was on a voyage from Emden to Saint Petersburg, Russia. |

== 15 August ==
List of shipwrecks: 15 August 1830
| Ship | State | Description |
|---|---|---|
| Amity | United Kingdom | The ship was wrecked on the coast of Florida, United States. |
| Cosmopolite | France | The ship was wrecked near "Graverne", Sweden. Her crew were rescued. She was on a voyage from Dunkirk, Nord to a Russian port. |
| Earl Wellington | United Kingdom | The ship was driven onto the Thistle Rocks, off the coast of Sweden, and wrecked. Her crew were rescued. She was on a voyage from Riga, Russia to Hull, Yorkshire. |

== 16 August ==
List of shipwrecks: 16 August 1830
| Ship | State | Description |
|---|---|---|
| Lady Canning | United Kingdom | The ship was werecked on the coast of Florida, United States with the loss of all hands. She was on a voyage from Jamaica to Liverpool, Lancashire. |

== 17 August ==
List of shipwrecks: 17 August 1830
| Ship | State | Description |
|---|---|---|
| Harriet | Sweden | The ship was driven ashore on Texel, North Holland, Netherlands. She was on a voyage from Gothenburg to Guernsey. |
| Mary Ann | United Kingdom | The ship was wrecked at Cap-Haïtien, Haiti. Her crew were rescued. She was on a voyage from Halifax, Nova Scotia, British North America to Jamaica. |

== 18 August ==
List of shipwrecks: 18 August 1830
| Ship | State | Description |
|---|---|---|
| Boyne | United Kingdom | The ship was abandoned in the Atlantic Ocean. She was on a voyage from Jamaica to London. |
| Gina | United Kingdom | The ship was wrecked on Norderney, Kingdom of Hanover with the loss of all but her captain. She was on a voyage from Aalborg, Denmark to Ipswich, Suffolk. |
| Union | United Kingdom | The ship was wrecked on the Scroby Sands, Norfolk. Her crew were rescued. She was on a voyage from Newcastle upon Tyne, Northumberland to Rye, Sussex. |
| Victory | United Kingdom | The ship foundered in the North Sea off Vlieland, Friesland, Netherlands with the loss of all hands. She was on a voyage from Newcastle upon Tyne, Northumberland to Harlingen, Friesland. |

== 19 August ==
List of shipwrecks: 19 August 1830
| Ship | State | Description |
|---|---|---|
| Cupido | Sweden | The ship was driven ashore on Juist, Kingdom of Hanover. She was on a voyage from Hamburg to Stockholm. |
| Freund George | Hamburg | The ship was driven ashore on Juist She was on a voyage from Altona to Hull, Yorkshire, United Kingdom. |
| Katherine | Denmark | The ship was abandoned in the North Sea. She was on a voyage from Hull to Sunderland, County Durham. The wreck later came ashore at Cley-next-the-Sea, Norfolk. |

== 20 August ==
List of shipwrecks: 20 August 1830
| Ship | State | Description |
|---|---|---|
| Amaryllis | United Kingdom | The ship was wrecked at Dominica. Her crew were rescued. |
| Eusebia | United Kingdom | The ship was driven ashore and wrecked at Scheveningen, South Holland, Netherlands. She was on a voyage from Riga, Russia to Barbados. |

== 21 August ==
List of shipwrecks: 21 August 1830
| Ship | State | Description |
|---|---|---|
| Augusta | Hamburg | The ship was wrecked on the Vogel Sand, in the North Sea. Her crew were rescued. She was on a voyage from Arkhangelsk, Russia to Hamburg. |

== 24 August ==
List of shipwrecks: 24 August 1830
| Ship | State | Description |
|---|---|---|
| Aurora | United Kingdom | The ship foundered in the English Channel off Egypt Point, Isle of Wight with the loss of her captain. |
| Matchless | (United Kingdom of Great Britain and Ireland) Demerara | The ship was wrecked in the Atlantic Ocean with the loss of four of her seven crew. Survivors were rescued by St. Croix (United Kingdom). Matchless was on a voyage from Demerara to Halifax, Nova Scotia, British North America. |
| Unternehmung | Hamburg | The ship was lost off Scharhörn. |

== 25 August ==
List of shipwrecks: 25 August 1830
| Ship | State | Description |
|---|---|---|
| Aurora | United Kingdom | The ship was driven ashore at Penteivan, Cornwall. |
| Royal Charlotte | United Kingdom | The ship was wrecked at sea. Her crew were rescued by Susannah (United States). Royal Charlotte was on a voyage from Jamaica to Dublin. |

== 27 August ==
List of shipwrecks: 27 August 1830
| Ship | State | Description |
|---|---|---|
| Commerce | United Kingdom | The sloop was driven ashore and wrecked at Pendle-mawr. Her crew were rescued. |
| Henry | United Kingdom | The ship was wrecked at sea and abandoned. Her twelve crew were rescued by Intrepid (United Kingdom). |
| Hornet | United Kingdom | The sloop was driven ashore and wrecked at Pendle-mawr. Her crew survived. |
| Mary | United Kingdom | The schooner was driven ashore and wrecked on Borkum, Kingdom of Hanover. |
| May | United Kingdom | The flat was driven ashore and wrecked at Pendle-mawr. Her four crew were rescued. |
| Stag | United Kingdom | The sloop was driven ashore and wrecked at Pendle-mawr. |

== 28 August ==
List of shipwrecks: 28 August 1830
| Ship | State | Description |
|---|---|---|
| Caroline | United Kingdom | The ship was driven ashore and wrecked near Dunbar, Lothian. Her eight crew were rescued, but her captain subsequently died. She was on a voyage from Hull, Yorkshire to Leith, Lothian. |
| David | United Kingdom | The ship was driven ashore and wrecked near Dunbar. Her crew were rescued. |
| Peggy | United Kingdom | The sloop was driven ashore and wrecked near Dunbar. Her four crew were rescued by rocket apparatus. |
| Saturnus | (Russian Empire) Grand Duchy of Finland | The schooner was wrecked at Peterhead, Aberdeenshire, United Kingdom. Her crew were rescued. She was on a voyage from Kusko to Peterhead. |
| Thomas and Dorothy | United Kingdom | The ship foundered in The Solent off St Helens, Isle of Wight. Her crew were rescued. |
| Wellington | United Kingdom | The ship foundered in the North Sea off the Koll Sandbank. Her crew were rescued. She was on a voyage from Danzig, Prussia to Liverpool, Lancashire. |

== 31 August ==
List of shipwrecks: 31 August 1830
| Ship | State | Description |
|---|---|---|
| Boode | United Kingdom | The ship was sighted off Barbados whilst on a voyage from Demerara to Liverpool, Lancashire. No further trace, presumed foundered with the loss of all hands. |

== Unknown date ==
List of shipwrecks: Unknown date 1830
| Ship | State | Description |
|---|---|---|
| Jamaica | United Kingdom | The ship was lost on Sable Island, Nova Scotia, British North America before 9 August. |
| Olive | United States | The fishing schooner was lost while Mackerel fishing. All 7 crew were killed. |
