= List of shipwrecks in March 1939 =

The list of shipwrecks in March 1939 includes ships sunk, foundered, grounded, or otherwise lost during March 1939.

== 2 March ==
List of shipwrecks: 2 March 1939
Ship	State	Description
Amizade Segundo	Portugal	The schooner was wrecked in the Tagus.
Gemlock	United Kingdom	The cargo ship ran aground in the South China Sea (38°56′N 12°07′E). Although she was declared a total loss, she was refloated on 29 July and towed to Shanghai, China. Subsequently repaired and returned to service.
Juniata	United Kingdom	Juniata The tanker was scuttled at Inganess Bay, Orkney Islands. The wreck is still in situ as of November 2008.
Prudent de Moraes	Brazil	The passenger ship ran aground on Punta Carrera, Chile.

== 4 March ==
List of shipwrecks: 4 March 1939
Ship	State	Description
Kung Lee	China	The passenger ship struck Round Rock, Wei Hai Wei and sank. All passengers and crew were rescued.
Matilda	Denmark	The schooner ran aground on Falsterbo Reef, Sweden. She was a total loss.

== 5 March ==
List of shipwrecks: 5 March 1939
Ship	State	Description
Orm Jarl	Norway	The cargo ship collided with D'Entrecasteaux (France) in the Scheldt and sank on the Kettelplaat.

== 7 March ==
List of shipwrecks: 7 March 1939
Ship	State	Description
Castillo de Olite	Spanish Navy	Spanish Civil War: The troopship was shelled and sunk off Cartagena, Spain by a 15 in (381 mm) coast artillery battery with the loss of 1,476 sailors/soldiers, 342 wounded and 294 taken as prisoners of war.

== 8 March ==
List of shipwrecks: 8 March 1939
Ship	State	Description
Saint Prosper	France	Spanish Civil War: The 4,330 GRT cargo ship on a passage from Algiers for Marseille in ballast, struck a mine off Roses, Spain and sank with the loss of all 27 crew.

== 9 March ==
List of shipwrecks: 9 March 1939
Ship	State	Description
Gannet	United Kingdom	The Thames barge sank off Brightlingsea, Essex. All of her crew were rescued.
Malini	Thailand	The 1,278 GRT cargo ship on a passage from Singapore for Bangkok in ballast, sank off Pulau Tioman, 30 miles (48 km) northeast of Mersing, Malaya after an air compressor exploded in her engine room. One of her 61 crew was killed by the explosion.
Maria Ignez	Portugal	The sailing ship was abandoned off Cabo Raso in a waterlogged condition. She was taken into Lisbon the next day.

== 10 March ==
List of shipwrecks: 10 March 1939
Ship	State	Description
Chepo	Panama	The cargo ship ran aground at Cape Sidero, Crete, Greece.
Egeran	Germany	The cargo ship foundered in the North Sea after passing the Elbe Lighthouse. She was on a voyage from Hamburg to Rotterdam, South Holland, Netherlands.
Sontay	France	The cargo liner ran aground on the Meteor Reef, French Somaliland.

== 13 March ==
List of shipwrecks: 13 March 1939
Ship	State	Description
Ham 107	Union of South Africa	The dredger dredged up an anchor which pierced her bottom. She capsized and sank at Cape Town.

== 14 March ==
List of shipwrecks: 14 March 1939
Ship	State	Description
Dorothy M	United States	After the fishing vessel's engine backfired at Meyers Chuck, Territory of Alaska, and ignited a fire that threatened to burn out of control, a crewman scuttled her as a means of extinguishing the fire by blowing a hole in her hull with a shotgun. The two men aboard survived unharmed, and she later was salvaged.
Shelbrit 4	United Kingdom	The tanker ran aground on the Campbell Rock, off Ardrossan, Ayrshire.
Spes Nostra	Netherlands	The cargo ship collided with Gertrud Fritzen (Germany) at Emden, Germany, and sank.

== 15 March ==
List of shipwrecks: 15 March 1939
Ship	State	Description
Soriano	United Kingdom	World War II: The Admiralty-requisitioned cargo ship was scuttled as a block ship in Kirk Sound, Scapa Flow, Orkney Islands. She was salvaged in 1948.

== 16 March ==
List of shipwrecks: 16 March 1939
Ship	State	Description
Carthage	(France) Tunisia	The cargo ship came ashore near Kelibia.
Dunleary	United Kingdom	The cargo ship ran aground at Troon, Ayrshire. She was refloated later that day.
HMAS Tasmania	Royal Australian Navy	The S-class destroyer was scuttled in the Pacific Ocean off the coast of New South Wales.

== 17 March ==
List of shipwrecks: 17 March 1939
Ship	State	Description
Alabama	France	The cargo ship ran aground in the Scheldt at Hansweert, Zeeland, Netherlands. She was refloated the next day.

== 19 March ==
List of shipwrecks: 19 March 1939
Ship	State	Description
Orion	Estonia	The cargo ship ran aground at Skælskør, Denmark.
Shinai	United Kingdom	The cargo ship struck an uncharted rock at Chaunchow, China and was holed. She was taken to Amoy to be beached for temporary repairs to be made.
Vassilios T.	Greece	The cargo ship struck a rock in the Adriatic Sea off Vis and sank. All of her crew were rescued.

== 21 March ==
List of shipwrecks: 21 March 1939
Ship	State	Description
HMS Aberdeen	Royal Navy	The Grimsby-class sloop ran aground at St Tropez, Var, France. She was refloated on 23 March.
Fort de Souville	France	The cargo ship came ashore near the Nieuwe Sluis Lighthouse, Netherlands. She was refloated on 23 March.
Frode	France	The cargo ship ran aground at Danzig, Germany. She was refloated later that day.

== 22 March ==
List of shipwrecks: 22 March 1939
Ship	State	Description
Abukir	Egypt	The cargo ship ran aground at Larnaca, Cyprus. She was refloated on 28 March.
Camro	Australia	The ketch was scuttled in the Pacific Ocean off Sydney, New South Wales.
Gianni Paolo	Italy	The cargo ship ran aground at Zlarin, Yugoslavia. She was refloated the next day.
Grangemouth	United Kingdom	The cargo liner collided with the fishing trawler Sudanese (United Kingdom) in the North Sea off Hornsea, Yorkshire and was damaged. She was taken in tow but sank the next day.
Sphene	United Kingdom	The cargo ship ran aground off Lindisfarne, Northumberland and was holed. She was later refloated and entered the harbour flooded at the forepeak.

== 23 March ==
List of shipwrecks: 23 March 1939
Ship	State	Description
Spartan	United Kingdom	The steam lighter sprang a leak off Islay and was beached at Port Ellen, Argyllshire.

== 24 March ==
List of shipwrecks: 24 March 1939
Ship	State	Description
Limpopo	Portugal	The cargo liner ran aground in the Limpopo. She was refloated on 30 April having lost a propeller.
Wolfsburg	Germany	The cargo ship ran aground on the Farasan Islands in the Red Sea and was holed. She was later refloated and proceeded to Basrah, Iraq for inspection.

== 26 March ==
List of shipwrecks: 26 March 1939
Ship	State	Description
Point Vincente	United States	The cargo ship ran aground on Bona Island, 25 nautical miles (46 km) south of Balboa, Panama and was holed. She was scuttled off the coast of Panama in June 1939.
Stanmount	United Kingdom	The tanker ran aground in the Dardanelles at Soğanlıdere, Turkey. She was refloated on 30 March and taken in to Chanak.

== 27 March ==
List of shipwrecks: 27 March 1939
Ship	State	Description
Cite D'Athenes	France	The cargo ship foundered off Psara, Greece with the loss of all hands.
Frixos	Greece	The cargo ship foundered off Levitha with the loss of all but one of the crew.

== 28 March ==
List of shipwrecks: 28 March 1939
Ship	State	Description
Chelyuskinets	Soviet Union	The cargo ship ran aground on the Revelstein Reef in the Baltic Sea. She broke in two and was declared a total loss. The stern section was refloated on 7 April and towed to Tallinn, Estonia. It was then towed to Leningrad. The bow section was refloated on 11 May and towed to Leningrad.

== 29 March ==
List of shipwrecks: 29 March 1939
Ship	State	Description
Adele Ohlrogge	Germany	The cargo ship ran aground at Scharhörn in the Wadden Sea. She was refloated the next day.
Apu	Finland	The icebreaker ran aground at Ekenäs. She was refloated on 1 April.
Sirenes	Norway	The cargo ship ran aground off Danzig, Germany.

== Unknown date ==
List of shipwrecks: Unknown Date March 1939
Ship	State	Description
Margaret Rose	Spain	Spanish Civil War:The 140.4-foot (42.8 m) cargo ship, a former trawler, was bombed and sunk at Almeria Spain sometime in March. Raised, repaired and retuned to service.
V-20 Urllobo	Spanish Navy	Spanish Civil War: The auxiliary patrol ship was lost.
V-29 Aturuxo	Spanish Navy	Spanish Civil War: The auxiliary patrol ship was lost.
