= List of shipwrecks in August 1826 =

The list of shipwrecks in August 1826 includes ships sunk, foundered, grounded, or otherwise lost during August 1826.

== 1 August ==
List of shipwrecks: 1 August 1826
Ship	State	Description
Iris	United Kingdom	The ship was driven ashore and wrecked at "Polangin", Prussia.
Louisa	United Kingdom	The ship foundered in the Pacific Ocean. She was on a voyage from Mazatlán, Mexico to Valparaíso, Chile.
Mère aux Huit Enfans	France	The ship was wrecked on South Caicos. All on board were rescued. She was on a voyage from Cap-Haïtien, Haiti to Havre de Grâce, Seine-Inférieure.

== 5 August ==
List of shipwrecks: 5 August 1826
Ship	State	Description
Sceptre	United Kingdom	The ship was lost in the Turks Islands. She was on a voyage from Halifax, Nova Scotia, British North America to Jamaica.

== 6 August ==
List of shipwrecks: 6 August 1826
Ship	State	Description
Eliza	(United Kingdom of Great Britain and Ireland) Antigua	The drogher was wrecked at Antigua.
Josephine	(United Kingdom of Great Britain and Ireland) Jersey	The ship ran aground and sank at Jersey. She was on a voyage from Gothenburg, Sweden to Jersey.

== 7 August ==
List of shipwrecks: 7 August 1826
Ship	State	Description
Mariner	(United Kingdom of Great Britain and Ireland) British North America	The schooner was wrecked at St. Shotts, Nova Scotia. Her crew were rescued. She was on a voyage from Manchester, Nova Scotia to Saint John, New Brunswick.

== 8 August ==
List of shipwrecks: 8 August 1826
Ship	State	Description
Valiant	United Kingdom	The ship was driven ashore at Whitby, Yorkshire. She was on a voyage from Quebec City, Lower Canada, British North America to Whitby.

== 10 August ==
List of shipwrecks: 10 August 1826
Ship	State	Description
Trelawney	United Kingdom	The ship departed from Jamaica for London. No further trace, presumed foundered with the loss of all hands.

== 12 August ==
List of shipwrecks: 12 August 1826
Ship	State	Description
James	United Kingdom	The ship was wrecked in the Magdalen Islands, Lower Canada, British North America. Her crew were rescued.

== 14 August ==
List of shipwrecks: 14 August 1826
Ship	State	Description
Jane	United Kingdom	The ship ran run down and sunk off the Tuskar Rock. A crew member was rescued by the other vessel, the rest by Montezuma (United States). Jane was on a voyage from Swansea to "Festhard".
Segar	United Kingdom	The ship was lost on Great Heneaga, Bahamas. Her crew were rescued. She was on a voyage from Jamaica to London.

== 15 August ==
List of shipwrecks: 15 August 1826
Ship	State	Description
Arethusa	United States	The ship was wrecked on the Rocks Cruz de Reyes with the loss of eleven of her crew. She was on a voyage from Baltimore, Maryland to Rio de Janeiro, Brazil.
Bardsea	United Kingdom	The ship was driven ashore near Maryport, Cumberland. She was refloated the next day.
Kitty	United Kingdom	The ship sank at Harrington, Cumberland.
Lark	United Kingdom	The ship was driven ashore and severely damaged at Maryport. She was later refloated and taken in to Maryport.
Nancy	United Kingdom	The ship was driven ashore at Skinburness, Cumberland.
Philip	United Kingdom	The ship departed from Jamaica for London. No further trace, presumed foundered with the loss of all hands.

== 20 August ==
List of shipwrecks: 20 August 1826
Ship	State	Description
Hope	United Kingdom	The ship was driven ashore on Scharhörn. She was on a voyage from London to Hamburg. Hope was later refloated and taken in to Hamburg.

== 22 August ==
List of shipwrecks: 22 August 1826
Ship	State	Description
Mary	United Kingdom	The brig departed from Port-au-Prince, Haiti for London. No further trace, presumed foundered with the loss of all hands.

== 24 August ==
List of shipwrecks: 24 August 1826
Ship	State	Description
Caroline	(United Kingdom of Great Britain and Ireland) Jamaica	The ship was discovered abandoned in the Atlantic Ocean (20°23′N 80°00′W).
Ceres	United Kingdom	The ship was holed by an anchor and sank at Ramsgate, Kent. She was on a voyage from Sunderland, County Durham to Ramsgate.

== 25 August ==
List of shipwrecks: 25 August 1826
Ship	State	Description
Cherub	United Kingdom	The ship was driven ashore and severely damaged at St. Mary's, Isles of Scilly. She was on a voyage from Penzance, Cornwall to St. Mary's. Cherub was later refloated and taken in to St. Mary's.

== 26 August ==
List of shipwrecks: 26 August 1826
Ship	State	Description
Alert	United Kingdom	The ship struck the Briggs and sank. She was on a voyage from Liverpool, Lancashire to Newry, County Antrim. Alert was refloated and taken in to Groomsport, County Antrim, where she was condemned.
Larkins	United Kingdom	The ship departed from Havana, Cuba for London. No further trace, presumed foundered with the loss of all hands.

== 27 August ==
List of shipwrecks: 27 August 1826
Ship	State	Description
HMS Magpie	Royal Navy	The schooner capsized and sank in a squall 10 leagues (30 nautical miles (56 km)) west of "Murial", Cuba with the loss of all but two of her crew.
Mezen (Мезень)	Imperial Russian Navy	The transport ship ran aground and was wrecked in the skerries 6 nautical miles (11 km) north of Sommers in the Gulf of Finland. Her crew were rescued by a British merchant vessel. She was on a voyage from Kronstadt to Reval.

== 28 August ==
List of shipwrecks: 28 August 1826
Ship	State	Description
Isabella	United Kingdom	The ship ran aground on the Florida Reef. She was on a voyage from Jamaica to Glasgow, Renfrewshire. Isabella was refloated the next day and put into Charleston, South Carolina, United States.
Mary	United Kingdom	The ship was discovered abandoned off the Lemon and Ore Sand, in the North Sea. She was on a voyage from Saint Petersburg, Russia to London. Mary was towed in to Cromer, Norfolk, where she arrived on 17 September.
Progress	United Kingdom	The brig was driven ashore on Little Saltee, County Wexford. She was on a voyage from "Nipsiguit" to Dublin.
Woodburne	United Kingdom	The schooner was wrecked in Table Bay. Her crew were rescued.

== 30 August ==
List of shipwrecks: 30 August 1826
Ship	State	Description
Archduke	United Kingdom	The sloop was driven ashore crewless east of Dunbar, Lothian.
Myrtle	United Kingdom	The ship capsized in a squall in the North Sea off Sunderland, County Durham with the loss of two of her crew. She was on a voyage from Memel, Prussia to London.
Toujours le Meme	France	The ship was wrecked on the coast of Senegal.

== Unknown date ==
List of shipwrecks: Unknown date 1826
Ship	State	Description
Arethusa	United Kingdom	The ship was lost in the Strait of Torres before 18 August.
Fulgon	France	The full-rigged ship was driven ashore in the Boqueron Passage, Peru. She was refloated with assistance from HMS Blanche and HMS Cambridge (both Royal Navy).
Manilla	United Kingdom	The ship was lost in the Strait of Torres before 18 August.
Newcastle	(United Kingdom of Great Britain and Ireland) New South Wales	The ship departed from Newcastle in late August. No further trace, presumed foundered with the loss of all nine people on board.
Seagar	United Kingdom	The ship was driven ashore on Great Heneaga before 15 August. She was on a voyage from Jamaica to London.
Susannah	(United Kingdom of Great Britain and Ireland) Tobago	The drogher was lost at Tobago in early August.
