= List of shipwrecks in December 1849 =

The list of shipwrecks in December 1849 includes ships sunk, foundered, wrecked, grounded, or otherwise lost during December 1849.

== 1 December ==
List of shipwrecks: 1 December 1849
Ship	State	Description
Alexander	United Kingdom	The ship ran aground on the Wittsand, in the North Sea and was abandoned by her crew. She was on a voyage from Wick, Caithness to Hamburg. She was refloated and taken in to Hamburg.
Fatima	United Kingdom	The ship ran aground in the Weser. She was on a voyage from Hamburg to Liverpool, Lancashire. She was refloated.
Invoice	United Kingdom	The ship capsized at Swansea, Glamorgan.
Japea	Prussia	The ship was driven ashore at Great Yarmouth, Norfolk, United Kingdom. Her crew were rescued. She was on a voyage from Königsberg to London, United Kingdom. She was refloated on 17 December.
Mayflower	United Kingdom	The ship was wrecked on River Island, in the Bay of Fundy. She was on a voyage from Boston, Massachusetts, United States to Cornwallis, Nova Scotia, British North America. Also reported as occurring on 21 December.
Thomas Henry	United Kingdom	The ship was wrecked at How Point, Newfoundland, British North America. Her crew were rescued. She was on a voyage from Pugwash, Nova Scotia, British North America to London.

== 2 December ==
List of shipwrecks: 2 December 1849
Ship	State	Description
Elizabeth Reed	United Kingdom	The schooner was driven ashore by ice at Reval, Russia.
Fleur de Marée	France	The ship was drvem ashore at Great Yarmouth, Norfolk, United Kingdom. She was on a voyage from Newcastle upon Tyne, Northumberland, United Kingdom to Cette, Hérault. She was refloated on 17 December.
Galena	United States	The ship was in collision with Charles (United Kingdom) and foundered in the Atlantic Ocean with the loss of five of her seven crew. Survivors were rescued by Charles. Galena was on a voyage from New Orleans, Louisiana to New York.
Mount Etna	United Kingdom	The ship was driven ashore and wrecked on Swona, Orkney Islands. Her crew were rescued. She was on a voyage from Sunderland, County Durham to Quebec City, Province of Canada, British North America.
Rio Grande	United Kingdom	The ship was driven ashore on Pictou Island, Nova Scotia, British North America, where she was destroyed by fire. She was on a voyage from Pugwash, Nova Scotia to Liverpool, Lancashire.
Roeld Cuzen	Netherlands	The ship ran aground on the Goodwin Sands, Kent, United Kingdom. She was on a voyage from Amsterdam, North Holland to Naples, Kingdom of the Two Sicilies. She was refloated and taken in to Dover, Kent in a leay condition.
Sisters	United Kingdom	The schooner was wrecked north of the Upgang Rock, off Whitby, Yorkshire. Her crew survived.
Versuch	Stettin	The ship was driven ashore near Wolgast, Prussia. Her crew were rescued. She was on a voyage from Stettin to Königsberg, Prussia.
Victoria	United Kingdom	The brig was wrecked north of Whitby. Her crew survived.
White	United Kingdom	The ship was abandoned in the North Sea off the coast of Yorkshire. Her crew were rescued by the Whitby Lifeboate. She was subsequently wrecked on the Upgang Rock.

== 3 December ==
List of shipwrecks: 3 December 1849
Ship	State	Description
Agnes	United Kingdom	The ship was driven ashore at Lowestoft, Suffolk. She was on a voyage from Dover, Kent to South Shields, County Durham. She was refloated.
Alert	United Kingdom	The ship sprang a leak and was abandoned off the Inner Dowsing Sandbank, in the North Sea. She was on a voyage from South Shields to London.
Amelia and Mary	United Kingdom	The ship was driven ashore and wrecked at Hartlepool, County Durham. Her crew were rescued.
Cosmopolitan	United Kingdom	The ship was driven ashore at Hartlepool. Her crew were rescued.
Dalrymple	United Kingdom	The ship ran aground on the Sheringham Shoal, in the North Sea off the coast on Norfolk and was abandoned by her crew. She was on a voyage from North Shields, County Durham to London.
Dauntless	United Kingdom	The ship was driven ashore at Hartlepool. Her crew were rescued. She was on a voyage from Sunderland to London. She was refloated on 17 December.
Doubtful	United Kingdom	The ship was driven ashore and wrecked at Runswick, Yorkshire. Her crew were rescued.
Friendship	United Kingdom	The sloop was wrecked at Warkworth, Northumberland.
Garland	United Kingdom	The ship was driven ashore and wrecked at Hartlepool. Her crew were rescued.
Gipsey	United Kingdom	The ship was driven ashore at Lowestoft. She was on a voyage from Exeter, Devon to Hartlepool.
Good Design	United Kingdom	The brig was run down and sunk in the North Sea about 7 nautical miles (13 km) north east of Flamborough Head, Yorkshire. Two of her crew were rescued by Apollo (United Kingdom).
Henrietta	United Kingdom	The ship was driven ashore and wrecked at Hartlepool. Her crew were rescued.
Jeanette	France	The ship was driven ashore. She was on a voyage from London to Cherbourg, Seine-Inférieure. She was refloated and put in to Folkestone, Kent, United Kingdom in a leaky condition.
Johannssen	Greifswald	The ship was driven ashore and wrecked at Warkworth, Northumberland.
John	United Kingdom	The barque was driven ashore at Sunderland, County Durham with the loss of two of her crew.
Leeds	United Kingdom	The ship was wrecked at Sunderland. Her crew were rescued.
Lotus	United Kingdom	The ship was driven ashore and wrecked at Hartlepool. Her crew were rescued.
Louise Elizabeth	United Kingdom	The ship was driven ashore and sank at Scarborough, Yorkshire. She was on a voyage from South Shields to Maldon, Essex. She was refloated on 16 December.
Margaret	United Kingdom	The brig sprang a leak. She was run ashore and wrecked at Cambois, Northumberland. Her crew were rescued by a coble, apart from one who was rescued by rocket apparatus.
Mary	United Kingdom	The ship foundered in the North Sea off the Inner Dowsing Lightship ( Trinity House). Her crew were rescued. She was on a voyage from South Shields to London.
Mary Ann	United Kingdom	The schooner was wrecked off Burnham Overy Staithe, Norfolk. Her crew were rescued on 6 December by the schooner Minstrel (United Kingdom). Mary Ann was on a voyage from Selby, Yorkshire to Dieppe, Seine-Inférieure, France.
Nelson	United Kingdom	The ship ran aground at South Shields. She was on a voyage from Charlestown, Cornwall to Middlesbrough, Yorkshire.
Nereid	United Kingdom	The ship was driven ashore near Montrose, Forfarshire. Her crew were rescued by the Montrose Lifeboat. She was on a voyage from Saint Petersburg, Russia to Newcastle upon Tyne, Northumberland. She had become a wreck by 6 December.
Nimble	United Kingdom	The ship sank in the North Sea off Huntcliffe Foot, County Durham. Her crew were rescued.
Patterson	United Kingdom	The ship was driven ashore at Hartlepool. Her crew were rescued. She was on a voyage from Sunderland to London.
Pedestrian	United Kingdom	The brig was wrecked on the Pan Bush Rock, off the coast of Northumberland. Her crew were rescued by cobles from Low Hauxley. She was on a voyage from South Shields to London.
Pelion	United Kingdom	The ship was driven ashore at Hartlepool. Her crew were rescued.
Phoenix	United Kingdom	The ship ran aground at Kingstown, County Dublin. She was on a voyage from Antwerp, Belgium to Liverpool. She was refloated on 6 December and taken in to Dublin for repairs.
Ranger	United Kingdom	The ship was driven ashore near Carrickfergus, County Antrim. She was on a voyage from Sligo to Liverpool, Lancashire. She was refloated on 6 December and towed in to Belfast, County Antrim.
Riaston	United Kingdom	The ship was driven ashore and wrecked at Scarborough. She was on a voyage from Stockton-on-Tees, County Durham to Ipswich, Suffolk.
Rosetta	United Kingdom	The ship was driven ashore at Hartlepool. Her crew were rescued.
Rye	United Kingdom	The ship was driven ashore and sank at Scarborough. She was refloated on 12 December.
Sarah	United Kingdom	The ship was driven ashore and wrecked at Scarborough. She was on a voyage from Seaham, County Durham to Wisbech, Cambridgeshire.
Sceptre	United Kingdom	The ship was driven ashore at Hartlepool. Her crew were rescued. She was on a voyage from Sunderland to London.
Thyatira	United Kingdom	The ship was driven ashore and damaged at Hartlepool. Her crew were rescued. She was on a voyage from Seaham, County Durham to King's Lynn, Norfolk. She was refloated on 17 December.
Victoria	United Kingdom	The ship sank at Hartlepool. Her crew were rescued.
Victoria	United Kingdom	The ship was wrecked at Whitby, Yorkshire.
William and Nancy	United Kingdom	The ship was driven ashore at Bridlington, East Riding of Yorkshire. Her crew were rescued. She was on a voyage from London to Whitby, Yorkshire. She was refloated on 15 December and taken in to Bridlington.
William Thompson	United Kingdom	The ship was driven ashore and wrecked at Hartlepool. Her crew were rescued.
Wright	United Kingdom	The ship was wrecked at Whitby.

== 4 December ==
List of shipwrecks: 4 December 1849
Ship	State	Description
Aurora	Denmark	The sloop ran aground on the Herd Sand, in the North Sea off the coast of County Durham, United Kingdom. Her crew were rescued. She was refloated and taken in to South Shields, County Durham.
Betsey	United Kingdom	The brig ran aground and was wrecked on the Herd Sand. Her crew were rescued.
Bolivar	United Kingdom	The brig foundered in the North Sea off Berwick upon Tweed, Northumberland. Her crew were rescued. She was on a voyage from South Shields to London.
Colon	Spain	The ship ran aground off Dunkirk, Nord, France. She was on a voyage from Hamburg to Santander.
Copernicus	Danzig	The ship was abandoned in the North Sea. Her crew were rescued. She came ashore on "Sandoen Island", Denmark on 24 December.
Doris	United Kingdom	The ship was abandoned in the North Sea. She was subsequently taken in to Lowestoft, Suffolk, where she arrived on 6 December.
Dos Hirmaos	Portugal	The ship ran aground on Scroby Sands, Norfolk, United Kingdom. Her crew were rescued. She was on a voyage from Hamburg to Lisbon. She was taken in to Lowestoft, Suffolk, United Kingdom on 6 December.
Emma	United Kingdom	The ship was driven ashore at Hartlepool, County Durham. Her crew were rescued.
Governor McLeon	United Kingdom	The ship was presumed to have foundered on this date whilst on a voyage from Cape Coast Castle to London. Her logbook was discovered off Start Point, Devon in late February 1850, last entry dated 4 December 1849. All hands lost.
Pathfinder	United Kingdom	The ship was driven ashore at Montevideo, Uruguay.
South Shields Lifeboat	United Kingdom	The lifeboat capsized whilst going to the aid of Aurora (Denmark) and Betsey (United Kingdom) with the loss of 20 lives. There were three survivors.
Sultan	United Kingdom	The ship ran aground and was wrecked at Sunderland with the loss of two of her crew. She was on a voyage from South Shields to London.
Victoria	United Kingdom	The ship sank at Hartlepool. Her crew were rescued.

== 5 December ==
List of shipwrecks: 5 December 1849
Ship	State	Description
Barbara Erika	Sweden	The ship ran aground on the Kraksand. She was on a voyage from Västerås to Härnösand. She was refloated on 10 December and taken in to Hudiksvall.
Cambria	United Kingdom	The ship was driven ashore at the Mumbles, Glamorgan.
Emerald	United Kingdom	The ship ran aground north of Skagen, Denmark and was subsequently severely damaged by fire. She was on a voyage from Riga, Russia to Belfast, County Antrim.
Gazelle	United Kingdom	The brig ran aground on the Blackwater Bank, in the Irish Sea. She was refloated and driven ashore 18 nautical miles (33 km) north of Wexford, where she was wrecked. She was on a voyage from Demerara, British Guiana to Workington, Cumberland.
Hope	United Kingdom	The ship was driven ashore and severely damaged at the Mumbles.
Ivy	United Kingdom	The ship sank in the River Wear upstream of Stanhope, County Durham. She was refloated on 11 December.
Johann George	Hamburg	The ship was holed by ice in the Weser. She was on a voyage from Hamburg to San Francisco, Alta California. She put in to Cuxhaven for repairs.
Mary	United Kingdom	The ship was driven ashore at the Mumbles.
McRigotte	United Kingdom	The ship was driven ashore and severely damaged at Greenock, Renfrewshire. She was on a voyage from Liverpool, Lancashire to Glasgow, Renfrewshire. She was refloated on 23 December and taken in to "Adrapan".
Monica	United Kingdom	The ship ran aground at Bridlington, Yorkshire. She was on a voyage from Sunderland, County Durham to London. She was refloated the next day and taken in to Bridlington in a waterlogged condition.
Mount Etna	United Kingdom	The brig was driven ashore and wrecked on Swona, Orkney Islands She was on a voyage from Quebec City, Province of Canada, British North America to Sunderland.
Rigolette	United Kingdom	The ship was driven ashore and severely damaged on the Isle of Arran. She was on a voyage from Liverpool, Lancashire to Glasgow, Renfrewshire. She was refloated on 21 December and towed in to Ardrossan, Ayrshire.
William and Isabella	United Kingdom	The ship ran aground on the Scroby Sands, Norfolk She was on a voyage from Sunderland to London. She was refloated and resumed her voyage in a leaky condition with extra hands.

== 6 December ==
List of shipwrecks: 16 August 1849
Ship	State	Description
Andrew and Kitty	United Kingdom	The ship sank off the Copeland Islands, County Down. Her crew were rescued. She was on a voyage from Troon, Ayrshire to Fleetwood, Lancashire.
Clausine	Hamburg	The ship was wrecked on Scharhörn. Her crew were rescued.
Johanna Cornelia	Belgium	The ship was lost off Nieuwpoort, West Flanders. Her crew were rescued. She was on a voyage from London, United Kingdom to Ghent, West Flanders.
Kincardineshire	United Kingdom	The ship ran aground on Hellesholms Shallows, off the coast of Denmark. She was on a voyage from "Nestved", Denmark to an English port. She had been refloated by 17 December and resumed her voyage.
Lord Hill	United Kingdom	The ship was driven ashore and severely damaged at Hastings, Sussex.
Mars	United Kingdom	The ship ran aground on the Rose Sand, in the North Sea. She was consequently beached at Grimsby, Lincolnshire. She was on a voyage from South Shields, County Durham to London.
HMS Sappho	Royal Navy	HMS Sappho. The Racer-class brig-sloop ran aground in the Gulf of Honduras. She was later refloated.
Teazer	United Kingdom	The ship was wrecked on the Gunfleet Sand, in the North Sea off the coast of Essex.
William and Jane	United Kingdom	The ship was driven ashore at Hubberstone Point, Pembrokeshire. She was on a voyage from Liverpool, Lancashire to Havre de Grâce, Seine-Inférieure, France.

== 7 December ==
List of shipwrecks: 7 December 1849
Ship	State	Description
Angenora	United Kingdom	The ship was driven ashore at Popes Harbour, Nova Scotia, British North America. Her crew were rescued. She was on a voyage from Scotland to Halifax, Nova Scotia.
Ann Gales	United Kingdom	The barque was driven ashore and wrecked in Creden Bay, County Waterford with the loss of all but one of those on board. She was on a voyage from Waterford to London.
Brothers	United Kingdom	The ship sprang a leak and was abandoned in the North Sea off the coast of Lincolnshire. She was on a voyage from Glasgow, Renfrewshire to London. She subsequently came ashore on the Lincolnshire coast. Brothers was refloated the next day and taken in to Grimsby.
Cambria	United Kingdom	The ship was driven ashore and damaged at the Mumbles, Glamorgan.
Carl and Therese	Hamburg	The ship was wrecked near Cap-Haïtien, Haiti. Her crew were rescued. She was on a voyage from Hamburg to Cap-Haïtien.
Charlotte and Maria	United Kingdom	The ship was driven ashore at the Mumbles. She was refloated on 17 December.
Diadem	United Kingdom	The ship ran aground on the Oyster Bank, in the Belfast Lough and was damaged. She was on a voyage from Maryport, Cumberland to Belfast, County Antrim.
Diana	United Kingdom	The ship struck rocks and sank in Lough Foyle. Her crew were rescued. She was on a voyage from Maryport, Cumberland to Londonderry.
Digby	United Kingdom	The ship was wrecked on the Pan Sand, in the North Sea off the coast of Kent.
Effort	United Kingdom	The sailing barge was driven ashore and damaged at the Mumbles. She was refloated on 17 December.
Erin	United Kingdom	The ship was driven ashore at the Mumbles.
George Hood	(United Kingdom of Great Britain and Ireland) British North America	The ship was driven ashore on "Cariboo Island". She was on a voyage from Pugwash to Saint John's, Newfoundland.
Grace Darling	United Kingdom	The ship departed from Manila, Spanish East Indies for Singapore. No further trace, presumed foundered with the loss of all hands.
Heroine	United Kingdom	The ship was driven ashore at the Mumbles. She was refloated on 17 December.
John	United Kingdom	The brig was driven ashore west of Shoreham-by-Sea, Sussex.
John and Peter	United Kingdom	The ship was wrecked on the Falsterbo Reef, in the Baltic Sea. She was on a voyage from Rostock to an English port.
Lord Willoughby	United Kingdom	The ship was driven ashore at the Mumbles.
Málaga	Spain	The ship was lost at Adra. Her crew were rescued.
Mary	United Kingdom	The ship was driven ashore between Pendennis Castle and "Gillan Vase", Cornwall. Her crew survived. She was on a voyage from Accra, Africa to London. She was refloated on 30 December.
Potentate	United Kingdom	The ship was driven ashore at Kingsdown, Kent. She was on a voyage from London to Launceston, Van Diemen's Land.
Pursuit	United Kingdom	The ship ran aground on the North Rock, in the Irish Sea and was damaged. She was consequently beached at Ballyhalbert, County Down. Pursuit was on a voyage from Liverpool, Lancashire to Sligo. She was refloated on 1 January and taken in to Belfast, County Antrim for repairs.
Shepherdess	United Kingdom	The barque was driven ashore and wrecked at Polperro, Cornwall with the loss of two of the 23 people on board. She was on a voyage from Penang, Malaya to London.
St. Francisco	United Kingdom	The ship was driven ashore at Gallipoli, Ottoman Empire. She was on a voyage from Odesa to a British port. She was refloated on 27 December.
Sussex Lass	United Kingdom	The ship was driven ashore at Penarth, Glamorgan. She was on a voyage from Bristol, Gloucestershire to Cardiff, Glamorgan.
Theresine	France	The ship was wrecked at Seaton, Devon, United Kingdom. She was on a voyage from Rouen, Seine-Inférieure to Algiers, Algeria.
Tredegar	United Kingdom	The ship was driven ashore at the Mumbles. She was refloated on 17 December.
Verdant	United Kingdom	The ship was wrecked on the Falsterbo Reef. She was on a voyage from Memel, Prussia to an English port.
Whitehaven	United Kingdom	The steamship was driven ashore at Belfast. She was on a voyage from Belfast to Whitehaven, Cumberland.

== 8 December ==
List of shipwrecks: 10 December 1849
Ship	State	Description
Active	Russia	The ship ran aground on the Lemon and Ower Sand, in the North Sea. She was refloated but drove ashore at Sea Palling, Norfolk, United Kingdom.
Adjutor	Spain	The ship foundered 8 leagues (24 nautical miles (44 km) off Cartagena. Her crew were rescued. She was on a voyage from Torrevieja to Arendal, Norway.
Beta	United Kingdom	The collier, a brig, was wrecked on the Gunfleet Sand, in the North Sea off the coast of Essex. Her crew were rescued by Petrel (United Kingdom). She was on a voyage from Sunderland, County Durham to London.
Buona Rachale	Kingdom of the Two Sicilies	The ship ran aground on the Holm Sand, in the North Sea off the coast of Yorkshire, United Kingdom. She was on a voyage from Ragusa to Hull, Yorkshire. She was refloated and taken in to Hull.
Cadmus	United Kingdom	The brig was wrecked on the Amble Pan Rock, in the North sea off the coast of Northumberland. Her crew were rescued. She was on a voyage from London to Sunderland.
Chester	United Kingdom	The ship was driven ashore and wrecked at Kearney Point, County Antrim. She was on a voyage from Quebec City, Province of Canada, British North America to Liverpool, Lancashire. She was refloated on 14 December and towed in to Belfast, County Antrim.
Endeavour	United Kingdom	The collier, a brig, ran aground on the Gunfleet Sand. Her crew were rescued by HMRC Scout ( Board of Customs). She was on a voyage from Sunderland to London.
Frithjof	Norway	The ship ran aground at Stavanger. She was on a voyage from Cagliari, Sardinia to Stavanger. She was refloated and taken in to Stavanger.
Nestor	United Kingdom	The ship was driven ashore at wrecked at Sea Palling with the loss of four of her ten crew. Survivors were rescued by a lifeboat. She was on a voyage from Sunderland to Portsmouth, Hampshire.
Nisus	United Kingdom	The ship was driven ashore at Spittal Point, Northumberland. Her crew were rescued. She was on a voyage from Hull to Berwick upon Tweed, Northumberland. She was refloated on 10 December and taken in to Berwick upon Tweed.
Olive Branch	United Kingdom	The ship was driven ashore at Westport, County Mayo. She was on a voyage from Sunderland to Lisbon, Portugal.
Pheasant	United Kingdom	The ship was driven ashore on Bullagar Point, County Antrim. She was on a voyage from Fleetwood, Lancashire to Dundalk, County Louth. She was refloated on 9 December and taken in to Warrenpoint, County Antrim.
Rapid	United Kingdom	The collier, a brig, ran aground on the Gunfleet Sand. She was refloated but consequently sank off the West Rocks. Her crew were rescued by HMRC Scout ( Board of Customs).
Søgutton	Denmark	The sloop ran aground on the Gunfleet Sand. She was on a voyage from Nyköping to London, United Kingdom.
Unity	United Kingdom	The ship was driven ashore and wrecked at Belfast. Her crew were rescued. She was on a voyage from Liverpool to Newcastle upon Tyne, Northumberland.
Wanderer	Prussia	The ship was driven ashore at Greystones, County Wicklow, United Kingdom. She was on a voyage from Liverpool to Stettin.
William	United Kingdom	The collier ran aground on the Gunfleet Sand. Her crew were rescued by HMRC Scout ( Board of Customs). She was on a voyage from Whitstable, Kent to Seaham, County Durham.
Xerxes	United Kingdom	The brigantine was driven ashore at Beaumaris, Anglesey. She was on a voyage from Beaumaris to Liverpool. She was refloated.

== 9 December ==
List of shipwrecks: 9 December 1849
Ship	State	Description
Axel	Sweden	The ship ran aground on the Holm Sand, in the North Sea off the coast of Suffolk, United Kingdom. She was on a voyage from Gothenburg to Bristol, Gloucestershire, United Kingdom.
Ophelia	United Kingdom	The ship ran aground on the Newcombe Sand, in the North Sea off the coast of Suffolk.

== 10 December ==
List of shipwrecks: 10 December 1849
Ship	State	Description
Forsoget	Sweden	The ship was driven ashore on Copinsay, Orkney Islands in a capsized condition.
Franklin	United Kingdom	The schooner was driven ashore at Newburyport, Massachusetts, United States.
Industry	United Kingdom	The barque was wrecked near "Munsoorcottah", India with loss of life.
Lion	United Kingdom	The ship was driven ashore at Glückstadt, Duchy of Schleswig.

== 11 December ==
List of shipwrecks: 11 December 1849
Ship	State	Description
Canopus	United Kingdom	The barque was destroyed by fire in the Hooghly River Her crew survived. She was on a voyage from Calcutta, India to London.
David Henri	France	The ship was driven ashore at Djijelli, Algeria.
Helena	Sweden	The ship was wrecked on the Cork Sand, in the North Sea off the coast of Suffolk, United Kingdom. Her crew were rescued. She was on a voyage from Stockholm to Lisbon, Portugal.
Isabella	United Kingdom	The ship was driven ashore and wrecked at Cacouna, Province of Canada, British North America. She was on a voyage from Quebec City, Province of Canada to London. She floated off on 14 December and drifted down the Saint Lawrence River. She came ashore on 17 December on Apple Island, floated off and came ashore on Basque Island.
Lion	United Kingdom	The steamship ran aground at Glückstadt, Duchy of Holstein.
Princess Royal	United Kingdom	The full-rigged ship was wrecked at "Munscoorcottah", India with the loss of all but one of her crew.
Shamrock	United Kingdom	The schooner was wrecked on the Nash Sand, in the Bristol Channel. Her crew were rescued. She was on a voyage from Port Talbot, Glamorgan to Bridgwater, Somerset.
Thetis	(United Kingdom of Great Britain and Ireland) Saint Kitts	The sloop sank off Brimstone Hill with the loss of a crew member.

== 12 December ==
List of shipwrecks: 12 December 1849
Ship	State	Description
Birgithe	Norway	The ship foundered with the loss of two of her crew. Survivors were rescued by Oberon (Sweden). She was on a voyage from Newcastle upon Tyne, Northumberland, United Kingdom to Christiana.
Ellen Evans	United Kingdom	The schooner sank off Moelfre, Anglesey. She was refloated on 19 June 1850 and taken in to Liverpool, Lancashire.
Gipsey	United Kingdom	The ship was driven ashore and wrecked at Malignant Cove, Nova Scotia, British North America. She was on a voyage from Prince Edward Island, British North America to London.
Hamburg	Hamburg	The steamship ran aground on the Rhinplate. She was refloated on 14 December and taken in to Glückstadt, Duchy of Holstein.
Medora	United Kingdom	The schooner was wrecked at the mouth of the Voltar. She was on a voyage from British Accra to "Ahquy".
Sarah	Denmark	The brig was driven ashore at Cuxhaven. She was on a voyage from Çeşme, Ottoman Empire to Hamburg.
Zeffiro	Kingdom of the Two Sicilies	The brig was driven ashore at Cuxhaven. She was on a voyage from Constantinople, Ottoman Empire to Hamburg.

== 13 December ==
List of shipwrecks: 13 December 1849
Ship	State	Description
Aberfoyle	United Kingdom	The ship was run into in The Downs and was consequently beached at Deal, Kent. She was on a voyage from Calcutta, India to London. She was refloated on 16 December and taken in to Ramsgate, Kent.
Agapemone Adelphi	Greece	The ship was driven ashore near Queenstown, County Cork. She was on a voyage from Falmouth, Cornwall to Queenstown.
Iceni	United Kingdom	The ship was driven ashore at Tavira, Spain. She was on a voyage from Cádiz, Spain to Newfoundland, British North America. She had been refloated by 16 December and was taken in to Faro, Portugal for repairs, arriving on 17 December.
Lively	United Kingdom	The smack sank off Newport, Monmouthshire. Her crew were rescued.
Maria	Russia	The brig was wrecked on Islay, Outer Hebrides, United Kingdom. She was on a voyage from Sunderland, County Durham, United Kingdom to Bordeaux, Gironde, France.
Sophia	United Kingdom	The brig was abandoned at sea. All on board were rescued by Armide (United Kingdom.
Venus	(United Kingdom of Great Britain and Ireland) Guernsey	The brig was wrecked on the Manacles. Her crew were rescued by the pilot cutter Nicholas Jenking (United Kingdom). Venus was on a voyage from Guernsey to Newport, Monmouthshire.

== 14 December ==
List of shipwrecks: 14 December 1849
Ship	State	Description
Happy Jane	United Kingdom	The ship was wrecked on the Tynewater Rocks, on the coast of Northumberland. Her crew were rescued. She was on a voyage from Port Dundas, Renfrewshire to Sunderland, County Durham.
Hilda Charlotta	Sweden	The ship was in collision with Chebar (United Kingdom) and was abandoned in the Atlantic Ocean with the loss of her captain. Survivors were rescued by Chebar. Hilda Charlotta was on a voyage from Stockholm to Rio de Janeiro, Brazil.
Isabella	United Kingdom	The smack was driven ashore at Ardrossan, Ayrshire.
Jane	United Kingdom	The brig was in collision with an American vessel in the Atlantic Ocean (49°00′N 7°21′W). She consequently foundered two hours later. Her crew were rescued by Dygden (Russia). She was on a voyage from Cardiff, Glamorgan to Wilmington, North Carolina, United States.
John	United Kingdom	The ship was driven ashore and wrecked at Breaksea Point, Glamorgan. She was on a voyage from Whitehaven, Cumberland to Cardiff, Glamorgan.
John and Mary	United Kingdom	The sloop ran aground on the Corton Sand, in the North Sea off the coast of Suffolk. She was on a voyage from Antwerp, Belgium to London. She was refloated and taken in to Lowestoft, Suffolk.
Joseph and Mary	United Kingdom	The ship was wrecked on Inchkeith. She was on a voyage from Leith, Lothian to Stockton on Tees, County Durham.
Joseph Brown	United Kingdom	The ship was wrecked on Inchkeith. Her crew were rescued. She was on a voyage from Leith, Lothian to Stockton-on-Tees, County Durham.
Louisa	Russia	The schooner ran aground off Bornholm, Denmark. She was on a voyage from Lisbon, Portugal to Riga. She was refloated and taken in to Rønne.
Mary Jones	(United Kingdom of Great Britain and Ireland) British North America	The brig was driven ashore and wrecked between Port Eynon and Paviland, Glamorgan. She was on a voyage from Pugwash, Nova Scotia to Liverpool, Lancashire, United Kingdom.
Patapsco	United States	The brig was wrecked on the reef outside Honolulu harbour, Hawaiian Islands.
Père Chauvelon	France	The ship was wrecked near Saint-Nazaire, Loire-Inférieure. Her crew were rescued. She was on a voyage from Cardiff, Glamorgan to Nantes, Loire-Inférieure.
Robert Henry	United Kingdom	The ship was driven ashore at Barassie, Ayrshire.
Santa Trinidada	Greece	The ship was wrecked at Kinsale, County Cork, United Kingdom. She was on a voyage from Queenstown, County Cork to Dublin.
Venus	(United Kingdom of Great Britain and Ireland) Guernsey	The ship ran aground on The Manacles and sank. Her crew were rescued. She was on a voyage from Guernsey to Newport, Monmouthshire and Havana, Cuba.

== 15 December ==
List of shipwrecks: 15 December 1849
Ship	State	Description
Betsey	United Kingdom	The ship was driven ashore at Killarney, County Kerry. She was later refloated and towed in to Dublin, where she arrived on 15 February.
Emilie	Russia	The schooner foundered in the North Sea 10 nautical miles (19 km) off Huntcliffe, County Durham, United Kingdom. Her crew were rescued by Faithful (United Kingdom). Emilie was on a voyage from Windau to Hull, Yorkshire, United Kingdom.
Henry Betsy	Kingdom of Hanover	The ship was wrecked on Juist, Duchy of Holstein. Her crew were rescued. She was on a voyage from Hull to Brake.
Little Briton	United Kingdom	The ship struck a rock and sank in Lancresse Bay, Guernsey, Channel Islands. Her crew were rescued. She was on a voyage from São Miguel Island, Azores to London.
Little Brown	United Kingdom	The ship struck a sunken rock and foundered off the coast of Lincolnshire. Her crew were rescued.
Mary Campbell	United Kingdom	The ship was driven ashore near Gourock, Renfrewshire. She was on a voyage from Greenock, Renfrewshire to Berbice, British Guiana. She was refloated on 18 December.
Neptunus	(Denmark) Duchy of Holstein	The schooner was driven ashore at the Leasowe Lighthouse, Cheshire. Her crew were rescued. She was on a voyage from Neustadt in Holstein to Liverpool, Lancashire, United Kingdom.
Racer	United Kingdom	The ship was driven ashore at Gibraltar. She was consequently condemned.{
Saint Vincent	United Kingdom	The ship departed from South Shields, County Durham for Exeter, Devon. Presumed subsequently run down and sunk with the loss of all hands.
William Henry	United Kingdom	The ship ran aground on the Bannassee Sand, off the coast of Ayrshire.

== 16 December ==
List of shipwrecks: 16 December 1849
Ship	State	Description
Anna Maria	United Kingdom	The ship ran aground and was consequently beached at Exmouth, Devon.
Caroline Amalia	Prussia	The ship was in collision with To Brodre (Norway) and foundered in the Kattegat off Frederikshavn, Denmark. Her crew were rescued. She was on a voyage from Seaham, County Durham, United Kingdom to Kiel.
Good Intent	United Kingdom	The Sunderland-registered brig ran aground on the Scroby Sands, Norfolk. She was on a voyage from Sunderland, County Durham to London. She was refloated and taken in to Great Yarmouth.
Good Intent	United Kingdom	The Whitby-registered ship ran aground on the Scroby Sands. She was refloated and taken in to Great Yarmouth.
Helen Mills	United Kingdom	The ship struck a rock about 20 nautical miles (37 km) off Christiansand, Norway and was wrecked. Her crew were rescued. She was on a voyage from Assens, Denmark to London.
Hermanna Jacoba	Netherlands	The ship departed from Seaham for Amsterdam, North Holland. No further trace, presumed foundered with the loss of all hands.
Mary Dick	United Kingdom	The ship was in collision with the barque Camœna (United Kingdom) and foundered in the North Sea off Bridlington, Yorkshire. Her crew were rescued by Camœna (United Kingdom). Mary Dick was on a voyage from Hartlepool, County Durham to London.
Minerva	United Kingdom	The ship ran aground and was damaged on Scroby Sands. She was on a voyage from Hartlepool to London. She was refloated.
Providence	United Kingdom	The ship was in collision with Kezia (United Kingdom) and sank in the North Sea 7 nautical miles (13 km) off Whitby, Yorkshire. Her crew were rescued by Kezia
Thomas H. Benton	United States	The ship was wrecked on Angel Island, California.

== 17 December ==
List of shipwrecks: 17 December 1849
Ship	State	Description
Emilie	Belgium	The ship was driven ashore and wrecked at Mariakerke, West Flanders with the loss of all hands. She was on a voyage from London, United Kingdom to Antwerp.
Fame	United Kingdom	The ship was driven ashore at Cantic Point, Orkney Islands. She was refloated on 24 December.
Growler	(United Kingdom of Great Britain and Ireland) British North America	The ship was wrecked on Cape Sable Island, Nova Scotia. Her crew were rescued. She was on a voyage from Baltimore, Maryland to Saint John's, Newfoundland.
Rose	United Kingdom	The ship was driven ashore near "Roberts Knude", Denmark. She was on a voyage from Hull, Yorkshire to Marstrand, Sweden.
Sainte Anne	France	The chasse-marée was driven ashore in Rocquaine Bay, Guernsey, Channel Islands. Her crew survived. She was on a voyage from Brest, Finistère to Saint-Malo, Ille-et-Vilaine.
Sophie	(United Kingdom of Great Britain and Ireland) Guernsey	The ship was driven ashore and wrecked at Mount Brazil, Terceira Island, Azores. Her crew were rescued.

== 18 December ==
List of shipwrecks: 18 December 1849
Ship	State	Description
Adelaide	Hamburg	The ship struck a sunken rock and was damaged at Vega de Navia, Spain.
Colonel Smith	United Kingdom	The ship was driven ashore at Porthdinllaen, Caernarfonshire. She was refloated on 1 January 1850 and taken in to Porthdinllaen.
Grindon	United Kingdom	The brig ran aground on the Sizewell Bank, in the North Sea off the coast of Suffolk and was abandoned by her crew. She was presumed to have foundered. She was on a voyage from Sunderland, County Durham to Southampton, Hampshire.
Heinrich	Hamburg	The ship was driven ashore at Rottum, Groningen, Netherlands. She was on a voyage from Hull, Yorkshire, United Kingdom to Hamburg. She was refloated and taken in to Delfzijl, Groningen.
Isabella Collings	United Kingdom	The ship was in collision with Virgil (United Kingdom) and sank at Lowestoft, Suffolk with the loss of two of her crew. Survivors were rescued by Roxana (United Kingdom)
Istock	Trieste	The ship sank at Cardiff, Glamorgan, United Kingdom.
James	United Kingdom	The ship was in collision with Kezia (United Kingdom) and was abandoned in the North Sea. Her crew were rescued. She was on a voyage from Hartlepool, County Durham to London.
John Fox	United Kingdom	The ship ran aground on the Haisborough Sands, in the North Sea off the coast of Norfolk. She was on a voyage from Saint Petersburg, Russia to London. She was refloated and taken in to Great Yarmouth.

== 19 December ==
List of shipwrecks: 19 December 1849
Ship	State	Description
Agnes	Bremen	The ship was wrecked on Texel, North Holland, Netherlands with the loss of 44 of the 63 people on board. She was on a voyage from New York City to Bremen.
Antelope	United Kingdom	The ship ran aground on the Sizewell Bank, in the North Sea off the coast of Suffolk. She was refloated and put in to Aldeburgh for extra hands before resuming her voyage to London.
Britannia	United Kingdom	The ship was driven ashore and wrecked at "Peak", Yorkshire. Her crew were rescued.
Caroline	United Kingdom	The smack was in collision with the sloop William and Mary (United Kingdom) and foundered off Trusthorpe, Lincolnshire with the loss of one of her three crew. She was on a voyage from King's Lynn, Norfolk to Hull, Yorkshire. She came ashore and was wrecked at Ingoldmells, Lincolnshire.
Clio	United Kingdom	The schooner was wrecked near Rosehearty, Aberdeenshire with the loss of all hands. She was on a voyage from Aberdeen to Cromarty.
Flora MacDonald	United Kingdom	The ship ran aground on the Hats and Bands, in the Irish Sea. She was on a voyage from Liverpool, Lancashire to Bombay, India. She was refloated and put in to Milford Haven, Pembrokeshire in a leaky condition.
Garland	United Kingdom	The ship was destroyed by fire at Killough, County Down. Her crew were rescued. She was on a voyage from Belfast, County Antrim to Venice, Kingdom of Lombardy–Venetia.
Hebe	United Kingdom	The ship was driven ashore near Pasewalk, Prussia. She was on a voyage from Danzig to Grimsby, Lincolnshire.
Matthew Plummer	United Kingdom	The ship was wrecked near Mağara, Ottoman Empire with the loss of eight of her thirteen crew. She was on a voyage from Alexandria, Egypt to London.
Oneida	United States	The ship ran aground off the north west coast of Guernsey, Channel Islands and was wrecked. All 40 people on board were rescued. She was on a voyage from New York to Havre de Grâce, Seine-Inférieure, France.
Redesdale	United Kingdom	The ship ran aground on the Kentish Knock and was abandoned by her crew, who were rescued. She was on a voyage from Newcastle upon Tyne, Northumberland to Savannah, Georgia, United States.
Resolution	United Kingdom	The barque was driven ashore and severely damaged at Whitby, Yorkshire.
Slaney	United Kingdom	The ship ran aground and was damaged at Havre de Grâce, Seine-Inférieure, France. She was on a voyage from the Clyde to Rouen, Seine-Inférieure.
Tutalinta	United Kingdom	The ship was driven ashore and severely damaged at Whitby.

== 20 December ==
List of shipwrecks: 20 December 1849
Ship	State	Description
Caroline	United Kingdom	The ship was driven ashore and wrecked at Ingoldmells, Lincolnshire.
Charlotte	Russia	The ship was driven ashore and severely damaged at Gravelines, Nord, France. She was refloated and taken in to Dunkirk, Nord.
Dolphin	United Kingdom	The ship was wrecked near Nexø, Denmark. She was on a voyage from Danzig to Leith, Lothian.
Duke of Wellington	United Kingdom	The ship was driven ashore at Liverpool, Lancashire. She was refloated.
Flora	United Kingdom	The sloop was driven ashore 2 nautical miles (3.7 km) south of Filey, Yorkshire.
Fortunatus	Kingdom of Hanover	The barque was driven ashore on Spijkeroog. She was on a voyage from London, United Kingdom to the Ems. She was refloated on 28 December and taken in to Cuxhaven.
Harmony	United Kingdom	The ship was wrecked on the East Barrow Sand, in the North Sea off the coast of Essex. Her crew were rescued. She was on a voyage from South Shields, County Durham to London.
Io	United Kingdom	The ship ran aground off Malta. She was on a voyage from Alexandria, Egypt to Cork. She was refloated and taken in to Malta.
Nicholas and Elizabeth	United Kingdom	The schooner ran aground on the Stilsand, in the North Sea.
Pearsons	United Kingdom	The brig was in collision with the brig Weatherley (United Kingdom) and foundered in the Swin, off the coast of Essex. She was on a voyage from Middlesbrough, Yorkshire to London.
Souter Johnny	United Kingdom	The ship ran aground on the Burbo Bank, in Liverpool Bay. Her crew survived. She was on a voyage from Liverpool to Rio de Janeiro, Brazil. She was towed back to Liverpool on 1 January 1850.
Tweed	United Kingdom	The ship ran aground on the Wedge Sand, in the North Sea off the coast of Kent. She was on a voyage from London to Calais, France.

== 21 December ==
List of shipwrecks: 21 December 1849
Ship	State	Description
Amanda	United Kingdom	The ship ran aground on the Lichfield Flat, off Berbice, British Guiana. She was on a voyage from the Clyde to Berbice. She was abandoned on 2 January 1850.
Endeavour	United Kingdom	The sloop ran aground and was damaged on the Tilney Sand, in the North Sea off the coast of Lincolnshire. She was refloated and assisted in to Grimsby in a leaky condition by the pilot boat № 8 (United Kingdom).
Friendship	United Kingdom	The schooner ran aground on the Pan Sand, off the north Kent coast. She was on a voyage from Antwerp, Belgium to London. She was refloated and beached at Sheerness, Kent.
Margaretta	Denmark	The ship sank in the English Channel off New Romney, Kent. Her crew were rescued. She was on a voyage from Køge to Jersey, Channel Islands.
Nicholas and Elizabeth	United Kingdom	The schooner ran aground on the Steilsand. She was refloated on 23 December and resumed her voyage.
Ocean Queen	United Kingdom	The ship caught fire and was abandoned by her crew off the Cape of Good Hope, Cape Colony. Fourteen of her 29 crew were rescued by Jacques Gabriel (France), the others were reported missing. Ocean Queen was on a voyage from London to Suez, Egypt.
Thalia	United States	The ship was driven ashore and wrecked on Sunday Point, Nova Scotia, British North America. She was on a voyage from Boston, Massachusetts to Yarmouth, Nova Scotia.

== 22 December ==
List of shipwrecks: 22 December 1849
Ship	State	Description
Alexander	Hamburg	The ship ran aground in the Elbe. She was on a voyage from Hamburg to New York, United States.
Atlantic Ocean	Hamburg	The schooner ran aground on the Pagensand, in the North Sea. She was refloated and towed in to Cuxhaven.
Corsica	United Kingdom	The ship was damaged by fire at New Orleans, Louisiana, United States.
Howard	Hamburg	The ship was driven ashore at "Brunchausen".
Sophia	(United Kingdom of Great Britain and Ireland) Jersey	The ship was driven ashore east of Cape St. Mary's, Portugal. She was on a voyage from Seville, Spain to Falmouth, Cornwall. She was refloated and taken in to Faro, Portugal.
William Prowse	United Kingdom	The ship was wrecked near Valparaíso, Chile. She was on a voyage from San Antonio to San Francisco, California, United States.

== 23 December ==
List of shipwrecks: 23 December 1850
Ship	State	Description
Belle	United Kingdom	The ship was wrecked on Brier Island, Nova Scotia, British North America. She was on a voyage from Saint John, New Brunswick, British North America to Liverpool, Lancashire.
Fortuna	Duchy of Holstein	The ship ran aground on the Pattgardener Reef. She was on a voyage from an English port to Travemünde. She was refloated and resumed her voyage.
Lady Maxwell	United Kingdom	The ship was driven ashore at Owl's Head, Nova Scotia. She was on a voyage from Yarmouth, Nova Scotia to Fortune Bay.
Margaretta Sibeana	Flag unknown	The ship was wrecked at New Romney, Kent, United Kingdom. Her crew were rescued by the Coast Guard.
Mary Frances	(United Kingdom of Great Britain and Ireland) Saint Kitts	The sloop was wrecked on Sandy Island. She was on a voyage from Saint Thomas, Virgin Islands to Antigua.

== 24 December ==
List of shipwrecks: 24 December 1849
Ship	State	Description
Aafina	Prussia	The brig ran aground and sank in the Scheldt. She was on a voyage from Königsberg to Antwerp, Belgium.
Brothers	United Kingdom	The ship was driven ashore at Montrose, Forfarshire. She was refloated.
Columbus	United Kingdom	The ship was driven ashore and wrecked 3 nautical miles (5.6 km) east of the Dungeness Lighthouse, Kent. She was on a voyage from London to Bombay, India.
Copernicus	Danzig	The ship was driven ashore crewless on "Sandon Island", Norway. She was on a voyage from Danzig to Hull, Yorkshire, United Kingdom.
Due Gebroeders	Netherlands	The ship was driven ashore at "Ouhahee", Sandwich Islands. She was on a voyage from San Francisco, California, United States to a port in China. She was refloated on 1 January 1850.
Giuseppina	Spain	The ship was wrecked on a reef off Maria Farinha, Brazil. She was on a voyage from Cádiz to Pernambuco, Brazil.
Hannah	United Kingdom	The schooner ran aground on the Whitby Rock. Her crew were rescued. She had become a wreck by 29 December.
Mary Ann	United Kingdom	The ship was wrecked on the Whitby Rock. Her crew were rescued.

== 25 December ==
List of shipwrecks: 25 December 1849
Ship	State	Description
Acadian	United Kingdom	The ship was driven ashore in Halfway Tree Bay, Basseterre, Saint Kitts. She was consequently condemned.
Lavinia	United Kingdom	The ship ran aground in the River Suir.
Maartje Cornelia	Belgium	The ship departed from Brielle, South Holland, Netherlands for Newcastle upon Tyne, Northumberland, United Kingdom. Presumed subsequently foundered in the North Sea before 7 January; Some of her cargo was discovered floating, as was her rudder.
Zephyr	United Kingdom	The ship struck the Pearl Rock, in the Strait of Gibraltar. She was on a voyage from Odesa to Queenstown, County Cork. She consequently put in to Gibraltar the next day in a leaky condition.

== 26 December ==
List of shipwrecks: 26 December 1850
Ship	State	Description
Alkanna Hendrika	Netherlands	The ship departed from Sunderland, County Durham, United Kingdom for Amsterdam, North Holland. No further trace, presumed foundered with the loss of all hands.
Magdalena	Kingdom of Hanover	The barque ran aground in the Elbe off the Grauerort fortress. She was refloated the next day and taken in to Twielenfleth.
Olaf	Bremen	The ship was driven ashore by ice near Geestendorf.
Samuel Hicks	(United Kingdom of Great Britain and Ireland) British North America	The ship was abandoned in the Atlantic Ocean. Her crew were rescued by Catherine (United Kingdom). She was on a voyage from Liverpool, Lancashire to Castine, Maine, United States.

== 27 December ==
List of shipwrecks: 27 December 1849
Ship	State	Description
Belize	United Kingdom	The ship ran aground and was damaged at Sunderland, County Durham.
Commercial Packet	United Kingdom	The ship was beached at North Berwick, Berwickshire. She was on a voyage from Saint Andrews, Fife to Cromarty.
Delphin	Norway	The schooner struck a rock and sank at Portør. Her crew were rescued.
Lady Caroline	United Kingdom	The ship ran aground and was damaged on the Haaks Bank, in the North Sea off the coast of the Netherlands. She came ashore at Den Helder, North Holland. Her crew were rescued. Lady Caroline was on a voyage from New Brunswick, British North America to Hull, Yorkshire. She was refloated and beached at Den Helder, North Holland, Netherlands. Her crew were rescued.
Patriot	United Kingdom	The brig was driven ashore and severely damaged at Sunderland. Her crew were rescued by Carte's rocket apparatus and breeches buoy. She was repaired in situ, relaunched on 19 April 1850 and taken in to Sunderland.
Pearl	United Kingdom	The ship was in collision with a tug and sank at Liverpool. She was on a voyage from Newry, County Antrim to liverpool.
Robert Burns	United Kingdom	The schooner ran aground on the Herd Sand, in the North Sea off the coast of County Durham. She was refloated and taken in to South Shields, County Durham.
Sarah	United Kingdom	The flat sank at Liverpool, Lancashire. Her crew were rescued.
Wave	(United Kingdom of Great Britain and Ireland) Guernsey	The cutter was wrecked on Herm, Channel Islands. Her crew were rescued. She was on a voyage from Guernsey to Cherbourg, Manche, France.

== 28 December ==
List of shipwrecks: 28 December 1849
Ship	State	Description
Ann Cubit	United Kingdom	The sailing barge sank off Dungeness, Kent. Her crew were rescued. She was on a voyage from London to Rye, Sussex.
Arab	United Kingdom	The ship foundered in the Farne Islands, Northumberland. Her crew were rescued. She was on a voyage from Newcastle upon Tyne, Northumberland to Pettycur, Fife.
Betsey	United Kingdom	The sloop was wrecked on Coquet Island, Northumberland. Her crew were rescued. She was on a voyage from the River Tyne to a Scottish port.
Brilliant	United Kingdom	The steamship ran aground at South Shields, County Durham. She was on a voyage from Hull, Yorkshire to Leith, Lothian. She was refloated and taken in to South Shields.
Carlotta and Amelia	Portugal	The ship was driven ashore and severely damaged at Figueira da Foz. She was on a voyage from Figueira da Foz to Bahia, Brazil. She was refloated on 30 December and taken in to Figueira da Foz.
Cato	United Kingdom	The ship sank at Hartlepool, County Durham. Her crew were rescued.
Deux Sœurs	France	The ship put in to Porto Praya, Cape Verde Islands in a leaky condition and was abandoned as irreparable. She was on a voyage from Senegal to Bordeaux, Gironde.
Dronning Caroline Amelie	Prussia	The ship was in collision with a Norwegian vessel and sank. Her crew were rescued.
Gipsey	United Kingdom	The schooner was driven ashore at Bacton, Norfolk.
Jane Avery	United Kingdom	The ship was driven ashore 9 nautical miles (17 km) east of Calais, France. Her crew were rescued. She was on a voyage from Portsmouth, Hampshire to South Shields, County Durham.
John	United Kingdom	The ship was driven ashore south of Grimsby, Lincolnshire and was abandoned by her crew. She was on a voyage from Goole, Yorkshire to King's Lynn, Norfolk. She was later refloated and towed in to Grimsby.
John	United Kingdom	The schooner foundered in the Farne Islands. Her crew were rescued. she was on a voyage from Newcastle upon Tyne to Dundee, Forfarshire.
Jupiter	United Kingdom	The ship ran aground on the Columbine Sand, off the north Kent coast. She was on a voyage from London to Whitby, Yorkshire. She was refloated and taken in to The Swale.
Liberty	United Kingdom	The sloop was in collision with the steamship Britannia (United Kingdom) and foundered in the Farne Islands. Her crew were rescued.
Marie	France	The ship was driven ashore near Cherbourg, Seine-Inférieure. She was on a voyage from Bordeaux, Gironde to Cherbourg.
Mary Sarah	United Kingdom	The brigantine was wrecked on the North Bank, in Liverpool Bay. Her crew were rescued. She was on a voyage from Saint John's, Newfoundland, British North America to Liverpool, Lancashire. She was refloated and beached at Rock Ferry, Cheshire on 30 December
Midge	United Kingdom	The ship was driven ashore and severely damaged at Whitstable, Kent. She was on a voyage from Sunderland, County Durham to Whitstable. She was refloated on 1 January 1850 and taken in to Whitstable.
Nelly	United Kingdom	The schooner foundered in the Farne Islands. She was on a voyage from Montrose, Forfarshire to Middlesbrough, Yorkshire.
Rob the Ranter	United Kingdom	The ship ran aground and was damaged at Ramsey, Isle of Man. She was on a voyage from Limerick to Preston, Lancashire.
Saghalien	United Kingdom	The ship was driven ashore at Rhyl, Denbighshire. She was on a voyage from Liverpool to Glasgow, Renfrewshire. She was refloated on 16 January 1850 and taken in to Liverpool.
Spinks	United Kingdom	The ship was wrecked at Filey, Yorkshire with the loss of all hands. She was on a voyage from Dundee, Forfarshire to Newcastle upon Tyne, Northumberland.
Valiant	United Kingdom	The ship was driven ashore at "Perrey", Seine-Inférieure, France. She was on a voyage from Newcastle upon Tyne to Dieppe, Seine-Inférieure. She was refloated the next day and taken in to Havre de Grâce, Seine-Inférieure.
Vivid	United Kingdom	The ship was driven ashore west of Dunkirk, Nord, France. Her crew were rescued. She was refloated on 29 January 1850 and taken in to Dunkirk.

== 29 December ==
List of shipwrecks: 29 December 1849
Ship	State	Description
Agapemini Adelphi	Greece	The ship ran aground and sank at Kinsale, County Cork, United Kingdom. She was refloated on 2 February 1850 and towed in to Queenstown, County Cork.
Alice	United Kingdom	The ship was driven ashore near Valencia, Spain. She was on a voyage from Valencia to Culleray, Spain. She was refloated on 3 January 1850 and put back to Valencia.
Aurora	Kingdom of Hanover	The ship was driven ashore on the Dutch coast. She was on a voyage from London to Newcastle upon Tyne, Northumberland, United Kingdom. She was declared a total loss.
Caledonia	United Kingdom	The ship was in collision with Æolus (United Kingdom). She was then driven ashore and sank at Pakefield, Suffolk. Her crew were rescued. She was on a voyage from Hull, Yorkshire to Dundee, Forfarshire. She was refloated on 1 January 1850 and beached at Lowestoft, Suffolk.
City of Adelaide	United Kingdom	The barque sprang a leak and put in to Saint Thomas, Virgin Islands. She was on a voyage from Demerara, British Guiana to Cork. She was consequently condemned.
Dorothy	United Kingdom	The ship foundered in the North Sea with the loss of all hands. She was on a voyage from South Shields, County Durham to London.
Emperor	United Kingdom	The ship struck the pier and was severely damaged at Bridlington Yorkshire. She was further damaged when two other vessels ran into her.
Granger	United Kingdom	The ship foundered in the North Sea with the loss of all hands. She was on a voyage from South Shields to London.
Jane	United Kingdom	The brig ran aground and was wrecked on the Snow Bank, off the coast of Nord, France. Her crew survived. She was on a voyage from South Shields, County Durham to Constantinople, Ottoman Empire.
Jens Monbergs Minde	Denmark	The ship was driven ashore near Rugaard with the loss of all hands. She was on a voyage from an English port to Horsens.
Jeune Paul	France	The ship was wrecked off "Rizzo", Kingdom of the Two Sicilies with the loss of five of her crew.
Johanna	Hamburg	The ship was driven ashore at Helsingør, Denmark. She was on a voyage from Morea, Greece to Stettin.
Lydia	United Kingdom	The ship ran aground off Dunkirk, Nord. She was on a voyage from Whitby, Yorkshire to Seaham, County Durham. She was refloated and taken in to Dunkirk.
Nancy and Betty	United Kingdom	The ship was driven ashore near Southport, Lancashire. She was on a voyage from Newry, County Antrim to Liverpool, Lancashire.
Phoebe	United Kingdom	The ship sank off Bridlington, Yorkshire with the loss of all hands.
San Spiridone	Ottoman Empire	The ship was driven ashore at Galway, United Kingdom. She was on a voyage from Galaţi to Queenstown, County Cork and Galway.
Temperance	United Kingdom	The ship was damaged whilst loading at Port Isaac, Cornwall. She was taken in to Padstow, Cornwall for repairs.
Vrouw Elizabeth	Kingdom of Hanover	The ship was driven ashore near Katwijk aan Zee, South Holland, Netherlands. Her crew were rescued. She was on a voyage from Emden to London, United Kingdom.
Vrouw Jacobina	United Kingdom	The ship was driven ashore near Katwijk aan Zee. Her crew were rescued. She was on a voyage from Hull, Yorkshire to Amsterdam, North Holland.
William	United Kingdom	The ship ran aground and was severely damaged at Scarborough, Yorkshire.

== 30 December ==
List of shipwrecks: 30 December 1849
Ship	State	Description
Albert	Belgium	The ship was wrecked at Papeiti, Society Islands. She was on a voyage from Valparaíso, Chile to Papeiti.
Anna Lucy	United Kingdom	The ship was wrecked at Fécamp, Seine-Inférieure, France.
Barbara Catharina	Belgium	The ship lost at the mouth of the Scheldt with the loss of all but one of those on board. She was on a voyage from Liverpool, Lancashire, United Kingdom to Antwerp.
Defence	United Kingdom	The ship was run into by the steamship Ville de Bruges (Belgium) off Dover, Kent and was abandoned by her crew, who were rescued by a tug. She was on a voyage from Portsmouth, Hampshire to London. Defence was subsequently taken in to Dover.
Effort	United Kingdom	The sailing barge was driven ashore and wrecked at Spurn Point, Yorkshire. Her crew were rescued.
Fame	United Kingdom	The ship ran aground on Scroby Sands, Norfolk. She was on a voyage from Liverpool to Newcastle upon Tyne, Northumberland. She was refloated and taken in to Great Yarmouth, Norfolk in a leaky condition.
John Myers	United Kingdom	The ship was driven ashore and wrecked near Skipsea, Yorkshire. Her crew survived.
Kent	United Kingdom	The ship was severely damaged by fire at Whitstable, Kent.
Nameless	United Kingdom	The brig was driven ashore and wrecked at Calais, France. She was on a voyage from London to Hartlepool, County Durham or vice versa.
Navarino	United Kingdom	The brig was wrecked on the Brake Sand, off the north coast of Kent. Her crew were rescued by a schooner. She was on a voyage from Seaham, County Durham to London.
Phin	United Kingdom	The smack ran aground on Scroby Sands. She was refloated and taken in to Great Yarmouth.
Planet	United Kingdom	The brig was wrecked at Fécamp. Her crew were rescued.
William and Ann	United Kingdom	The brig was wrecked on the Brake Sand with the loss of all hands.
Undaunted	United Kingdom	The brig was driven ashore 2 nautical miles (3.7 km) south of Bridlington. She broke up on 16 January 1850.

== 31 December ==
List of shipwrecks: 31 December 1850
Ship	State	Description
Barbara Ann	(United Kingdom of Great Britain and Ireland) British North America	The ship was wrecked on Isle Madame, Nova Scotia. All on board were rescued. She was on a voyage from Saint John's, Newfoundland to Charlottetown, Prince Edward Island.
George	United Kingdom	The ship ran aground and was beached at San Francisco, Alta California. She was consequently condemned.
Knud	Denmark	The yacht was driven ashore and wrecked on the Dutch coast. She was on a voyage from Amsterdam, North Holland, Netherlands to Ipswich, Suffolk, United Kingdom.
Thornley	United Kingdom	The brig ran aground on the Maplin Sand, in the North Sea off the coast of Essex.
Undaunted	United Kingdom	The ship was beached at Bridlington, Yorkshire. She broke up on 16 January 1850.
Wanarin	United Kingdom	The ship was wrecked on the Brake Sand, off the north Kent coast. She was on a voyage from Seaham, County Durham to London.

== Unknown date ==
List of shipwrecks: Unknown date December 1849
Ship	State	Description
Active	United Kingdom	The ship was lost in the North Sea off the coast of Suffolk before 4 December.
Aimable Sociètè	France	The ship was abandoned before 20 December. Her crew were rescued. She was on a voyage from Rouen, Seine-Inférieure to Brest, Finistère.
Albatros	France	The ship was wrecked at Île Bourbon. Her crew were rescued.
Albert	(United Kingdom of Great Britain and Ireland) New Zealand	The Government survey schooner was wrecked at Mercury Bay during a heavy gale. All hands were saved.
Anna and Maria	Belgium	The ship was lost off Brouwershaven, Zeeland, Netherlands. She was on a voyage from Riga, Russia to Antwerp.
Blossom	United Kingdom	The sloop departed from South Shields, County Durham for Aberdeen. No further trace, presumed foundered in the North Sea on or about 28 December with the loss of all hands.
Charles	United Kingdom	The ship departed from Arracan for Singapore. No further trace, presumed foundered with the loss of all hands.
City of Chester	United Kingdom	The flat was driven ashore at Queenstown, County Cork. She was refloated and towed in to Dublin for repairs, arriving on 27 December.
Conqueror	United Kingdom	The ship was wrecked on the Gunfleet Sand with the loss of all hands before 28 December.
Cumberland	United Kingdom	The ship foundered in the South China Sea off the Luconia Shoals before 20 December with the loss of seven of her crew. She was on a voyage from Bali, Spanish East Indies to Shanghai, China. Survivors reached shore, and were subsequently rescued by the brigantine Brillante (Spain).
Earl of Lisburne	United Kingdom	The ship was wrecked on the Kish Bank, in the Irish Sea on or before 12 December.
Esther	France	The schooner was wrecked on the Triangles before 10 December. She was on a voyage from Veracruz to Ciudad del Carmen, Mexico.
Flirt	United Kingdom	The ship was wrecked on the Gunfleet Sand before 4 December.
Grinder	United Kingdom	The ship ran aground whilst on a voyage from Sunderland to Southampton, Hampshire. She was abandoned by her crew and was presumed to have foundered.
Helena	Sweden	The ship ran aground on the Cork Sand, in the North Sea off the coast of Essex before 14 December.
Industry	United Kingdom	The brig was lost in Jungshun Bay before 8 December. Her crew were rescued. She was on a voyage from Amoy, China to Shanghai.
Louisa	United Kingdom	The brig was driven ashore on Neuwerk. She was refloated on 30 December.
Martiniquais	France	The ship was driven ashore and wrecked at Caballos Point, California, United States and was abandoned by her crew.
Mary	United Kingdom	The ship was wrecked in the Brass River before 31 December. Her crew were rescued.
Oxonian	United Kingdom	The schooner was driven ashore at "Leckrobbie", Sutherland. She was on a voyage from a Baltic port to Portsoy, Aberdeenshire. She was refloated and taken in to Brora, Sutherland for repairs.
Pandora	United Kingdom	The ship foundered off Ouessant, Finistère, France. Her crew survived.
Perla	Spain	The ship ran aground off Bimini, Bahamas before 11 December. She was on a voyage from Santander to Havana, Cuba. She was refloated and completed her voyage, arriving on 11 December.
Perseverance	United Kingdom	The ship was driven ashore at Maryport, Cumberland. She was on a voyage from Belfast, County Antrim to Maryport. She was refloated on 19 December.
Potentate	United Kingdom	The ship was driven ashore near Kingsdown, Kent. She was refloated on 16 December and taken in to Ramsgate.
Providence	(United Kingdom of Great Britain and Ireland) New Zealand	The schooner was wrecked near Tauranga, during the same gale that wrecked the Albert ( (United Kingdom of Great Britain and Ireland) New Zealand.
Relampago	Spain	The ship ran aground on the Romer Shoals, off the coast of New York, United States between 24 and 29 December. She was refloated and towed in to New York City.
Rienzi	United Kingdom	The ship was abandoned in the Atlantic Ocean (48°40′N 10°08′W). Her crew were rescued. She was on a voyage from Liverpool to Coquimbo, Chile.
Thames	United Kingdom	The ship ran aground at "Kwan Harbour", New Zealand. She was on a voyage from London to Wellington, New Zealand. She was refloated on 10 December and resumed her voyage.
Thetis	United Kingdom	The ship ran aground off Great Yarmouth, Norfolk. She was refloated and resumed her voyage to Constantinople, Ottoman Empire, but consequently put in to Portsmouth, Hampshire on 23 December in a leaky condition.
William and Mary	United Kingdom	The ship was driven ashore at Bridlington, Yorkshire. She was refloated on 15 December and taken in to Bridlington.
