= List of shipwrecks in October 1847 =

The list of shipwrecks in October 1847 includes ships sunk, foundered, wrecked, grounded, or otherwise lost during October 1847.

== 1 October ==
List of shipwrecks: 1 October 1847
Ship	State	Description
Friede	Stettin	The ship foundered in the North Sea. Her crew took to a boat; they were rescued on 14 October by Maria (United Kingdom). Friede was on a voyage from Grangemouth, Stirlingshire, United Kingdom to Stettin.
Vigilant	Russia	The schooner struck the Outer Gabbard Sand, in the North Sea off the coast of Kent, United Kingdom and capsized. Her crew were rescued. She was on a voyage from Stettin to Saint-Malo, Ille-et-Vilaine, France. Vigilant was subsequently taken in to Margate, Kent in a derelict condition.

== 2 October ==
List of shipwrecks: 2 October 1847
Ship	State	Description
Alliancen	Stettin	The ship was driven ashore and wrecked near Swinemünde, Prussia. She was on a voyage from Wick, Caithness, United Kingdom to Stettin. She was refloated between 9 and 14 October and taken in to Swinemünde in a severely damaged condition.
Elizabeth	United Kingdom	The smack was wrecked at Cley-next-the-Sea, Norfolk. She was on a voyage from Hartlepool, County Durham to Cley-next-the-Sea.
Harmonie	Denmark	The ship was driven ashore at "Niven".
Lord of the Isles	United Kingdom	The ship departed from Constantinople, Ottoman Empire for an English port. No further trace, presumed foundered with the loss of all hands.
Mary	United Kingdom	The ship was driven ashore at Helsingør, Denmark. She was on a voyage from Saint Petersburg, Russia to Cork.

== 3 October ==
List of shipwrecks: 3 October 1847
Ship	State	Description
Isabella	United Kingdom	The ship was driven ashore in the Sound of Mull. She was on a voyage from South Shields, County Durham to Dublin. She was refloated and put in to Tobermory, Isle of Mull.
William	United Kingdom	The schooner ran aground on the Long Sand, in the North Sea off the coast of Essex. She was on a voyage from London to Antwerp, Belgium. She floated off but consequently foundered. Her crew were rescued.

== 4 October ==
List of shipwrecks: 4 October 1847
Ship	State	Description
Blessing	United Kingdom	The ship was driven ashore and wrecked at Marsala, Sicily with the loss of a crew member. She was on a voyage from "Marianople" to Cork or Falmouth, Cornwall.
Countess of Airlie	United Kingdom	The brigantine was at Helsingør, Denmark whilst on a voyage from Riga, Russia to London. No further trace, presumed foundered with the loss of all hands.
Florens	Netherlands	The ship departed from Odesa for Amsterdam, North Holland. No further trace, presumed foundered with the loss of all hands.
Marie Antoinette	France	The schooner was wrecked on the Cornel Sand, in Carmarthen Bay. She was on a voyage from the Île du Nord to Neath, Glamorgan, United Kingdom.
Mariner	United Kingdom	The ship was driven ashore in Narva Bay. Her crew survived. She was on a voyage from Liverpool, Lancashire to Narva, Russia.
Viatka	United Kingdom	The ship departed from Arkhangelsk, Russia for Hull, Yorkshire. No further trace, presumed foundered with the loss of all hands.

== 5 October ==
List of shipwrecks: 5 October 1847
Ship	State	Description
Lord Wenlock	United Kingdom	The ship was abandoned in the Atlantic Ocean off the south coast of Ireland. Her crew were rescued. She was on a voyage from Bonny to Liverpool, Lancashire.
Princess Victoria	United Kingdom	The ship was damaged by fire at North Shields, County Durham.
Two Brothers	United Kingdom	The ship was wrecked off Ameland, Friesland, Netherlands. She was on a voyage from Kronstadt, Russia to Ipswich, Suffolk.

== 6 October ==
List of shipwrecks: 6 October 1847
Ship	State	Description
Active	United Kingdom	The schooner was in collision with Malta (United Kingdom) and sank in the North Sea off Flamborough Head, Yorkshire. Her crew were rescued by Malta.
Findlay	United Kingdom	The ship was driven ashore south of Hartlepool, County Durham. She was refloated on 8 October and towed in to Hartlepool.
Hoffnung	Hamburg	The tjalk foundered in the Vriesche Gat. Her crew were rescued. She was on a voyage from Hamburg to Amsterdam, North Holland, Netherlands. Hoffnung came ashore on Ameland, Friesland on 7 October and was wrecked.
Jeune Catherine	France	The ship was lost near Saint-Brieuc, Côtes-du-Nord.
Patriot	United Kingdom	The brig was wrecked off Montrose, Forfarshire. Her crew were rescued by the Montrose Lifeboat. She was on a voyage from Riga, Russia to Montrose. Patriot was refloated on 28 October and towed in to Montrose.
Prompt	United Kingdom	The brig was wrecked off Montrose. Her crew were rescued by the Montrose Lifeboat. She was on a voyage from Arkhangelsk, Russia to Newcastle upon Tyne, Northumberland. Prompt was refloated on 21 October and towed in to Montrose.
Western Isles	United Kingdom	The ship was wrecked near Manghold Head with the loss of a crew member. She was on a voyage from Inverness to the Isle of Skye.
Wave	United Kingdom	The ship was driven ashore at Seaton Carew, County Durham.
Yalk	Hamburg	The ship ran aground off Neuwerk. She was on a voyage from "Leir" to Hamburg.
29th of October	Prussia	The brig ran aground on the North Garr, in the North Sea off the mouth of the River Tees. She was refloated and taken in to Seaton Carew.

== 7 October ==
List of shipwrecks: 7 October 1847
Ship	State	Description
Duchess of Northumberland	United Kingdom	The ship was driven ashore and wrecked at Carling Nose, Fife.
Emma	Sweden	The ship was driven ashore at the entrance to the Agger Canal, Denmark.
Forsoget	Sweden	The ship was abandoned off the Galloper Sand, in the North Sea. She was on a voyage from Isigny-sur-Mer, Calvados, France to Gothenburg.
Hammond	United Kingdom	The ship was driven ashore at Narva, Russia. She was on a voyage from Narva to Belfast, County Antrim. She was refloated the next day and put back to Narva.
Indus	Indian Navy	The steamship ran ashore and sank at Diu.
Peace	United Kingdom	The ship was driven ashore and damaged at Hartlepool Heugh, County Durham. Her crew were rescued. She was refloated on 8 October and taken in to Hartlepool.
Unicornen	Sweden	The ship was driven ashore at the entrance to the Agger Canal.
Warrior	United Kingdom	The brig was wrecked near Keiss Castle, Caithness with the loss of a crew member. She was on a voyage from Riga, Russia to Liverpool, Lancashire.
Weardale	United Kingdom	The ship ran aground on the Sparrow Hawk Sand, in the North Sea off the coast of County Durham. She was refloated the next day and towed in to North Shields, County Durham.

== 8 October ==
List of shipwrecks: 8 October 1847
Ship	State	Description
Acadia	United Kingdom	The ship ran aground on the Point Pleasant Shoal.

== 9 October ==
List of shipwrecks: 9 October 1847
Ship	State	Description
Brothers	United Kingdom	The ship was driven ashore in Red Bay.
Copia	United Kingdom	The schooner ran aground at the mouth of the Guadalhorce. She was on a voyage from Smyrna, Ottoman Empire to Falmouth, Cornwall. She was refloated.
Especulation	France	The ship was in collision with Napoleon (Hamburg) and sank in the Atlantic Ocean. Her crew were rescued. Especulation was on a voyage from Havre de Grâce, Seine-Inférieure to St. Ubes, Portugal.
Fortuna	(Denmark) Duchy of Schleswig	The ship was wrecked on a reef south of Læsø, Denmark. Her crew were rescued. She was on a voyage from Saint Petersburg, Russia to Antwerp, Belgium.
Sabina	United Kingdom	The ship departed from Pabos, Province of Canada, British North America for Porto, Portugal. No further trace, presumed foundered with the loss of all hands.
Swift	United Kingdom	The schooner foundered in the English Channel off The Needles, Isle of Wight. Her crew were rescued.
Queen of the Isles	(United Kingdom of Great Britain and Ireland) British North America	The schooner was wrecked on Prince Edward Island with the loss of all hands. She was on a voyage from Miramichi, New Brunswick to Halifax, Nova Scotia.

== 10 October ==
List of shipwrecks: 10 October 1847
Ship	State	Description
Adventure	(United Kingdom of Great Britain and Ireland) Jersey	The schooner brig was wrecked on Green Island, British North America. All on board were rescued.
Caroline	United Kingdom	The schooner was wrecked on the Binks, off the mouth of the Humber. All on board surviveded. She was on a voyage from Cardiff, Glamorgan to Hull, Yorkshire.
Goshawk	United Kingdom	The ship foundered off Cape de Gatt, Spain. Her crew were rescued. She was on a voyage from the Danube to Cork.
Iris	(Russian Empire) Grand Duchy of Finland	The ship was driven ashore and wrecked between Gunwalloe and Mullion, Cornwall, United Kingdom with the loss of six of her twelve crew. She was on a voyage from Volo to Falmouth, Cornwall.
Killermont	United Kingdom	The ship was driven ashore in Algoa Bay. Her crew were rescued. She was refloated.
Magnet	United Kingdom	The ship was driven ashore at the Mumbles, Glamorgan.

== 11 October ==
List of shipwrecks: 11 October 1847
Ship	State	Description
Archangel	Netherlands	The ship departed from Arkhangelsk, Russia for Amsterdam, North Holland. No further trace, presumed foundered with the loss of all hands.
Clarence	(United Kingdom of Great Britain and Ireland) Van Diemen's Land	The schooner was driven ashore near Warrnambool, New South Wales. She was refloated on 17 November.
James	(United Kingdom of Great Britain and Ireland) Barbados	The sloop was driven ashore in a hurricane and wrecked on Trinidad.
Lady of the Lake	(United Kingdom of Great Britain and Ireland) Barbados	The ketch was driven ashore in a hurricane and wrecked on Trinidad.
Norma	(United Kingdom of Great Britain and Ireland) Barbados	The schooner was driven ashore in a hurricane on Trinidad. She was later refloated.
Princess Charlotte	United Kingdom	The ship was abandoned in the Gulf of Saint Lawrence. Her crew were rescued by Promise (United Kingdom). Princess Charlotte was on a voyage from Quebec City, Province of Canada, British North America to London.
Richard	United Kingdom	The ship was driven ashore in the River Boyne. She was on a voyage from Wick, Caithness to Bristol, Gloucestershire. She was refloated that day, and resumed her voyage on 17 October.
Sugar Bird	(United Kingdom of Great Britain and Ireland) Barbados	The sloop was driven ashore in a hurricane and wrecked on Trinidad.
Vincent	United Kingdom	The brigantine was driven ashore in a hurricane and wrecked on Trinidad.
Warren Hastings	United Kingdom	The ship was abandoned in the Atlantic Ocean. She was on a voyage from Miramichi, New Brunswick, British North America to London.
Wave	(United Kingdom of Great Britain and Ireland) Barbados	The ship, a drogher or sloop, was driven ashore in a hurricane and wrecked on Trinidad.

== 12 October ==
List of shipwrecks: 12 October 1847
Ship	State	Description
Ann	United States	The ship was wrecked in the Bay of Fundy. Her crew were rescued. She was on a voyage from Boston, Massachusetts to Westport, Nova Scotia.
Bom Successo	Portugal	The ship was wrecked near Cabo Branco, Brazil. All on board were rescued. She was on a voyage from Figueira da Foz to Pernambuco, Brazil.
Emma	United Kingdom	The ship was driven ashore 15 nautical miles (28 km) south of Porto, Portugal. Her crew were rescued. She was on a voyage from Newcastle upon Tyne, Northumberland to Seville, Spain.
Royal Adelaide	United Kingdom	The barque was driven ashore east of Bridlington, Yorkshire. She was on a voyage from London to Leith, Lothian. She was refloated with the assistance of tugs and resumed her voyage.
Sea Bird	United Kingdom	The ship ran aground on the Gunfleet Sand, in the North Sea off the coast of Essex. She was on a voyage from London to Newcastle upon Tyne. She was refloated and taken in to Harwich, Essex.
Stagg	United Kingdom	The flat sank at Liverpool, Lancashire. She was on a voyage from Bangor, Caernarfonshire to Liverpool.
William Mitchell	United Kingdom	The ship ran aground on the Big Harkers, in the Farne Islands, Northumberland. Her crew were rescued. She was on a voyage from Amsterdam, North Holland, Netherlands to Leith, Lothian. She was subsequently taken in to Scarborough, Yorkshire

== 13 October ==
List of shipwrecks: 13 October 1847
Ship	State	Description
Chance	United Kingdom	The sloop was wrecked on the Whiteburn Rocks, off the coast of County Durham. Her crew were rescued.
Ireland	United Kingdom	The ship ran aground on the Newcomb Sand, in the English Channel. She was on a voyage from Newcastle upon Tyne, Northumberland to Cádiz, Spain. She was refloated and subsequently put in to Falmouth, Cornwall.
James Duncan	United Kingdom	The ship was driven ashore and sank at Cádiz, Spain. She was on a voyage from London to Cádiz. She was refloated on 17 July 1848 and towed in to the Puntales Naval Station, Cádiz.
Nautilus	United Kingdom	The ship was assisted in to Whale Harbour, Province of Canada, British North America in a waterlogged condition. She was on a voyage from Quebec City, Province of Canada to Plymouth, Devon. She was subsequently condemned.
Wellington	United Kingdom	The sloop was wrecked at Llanddwyn Point, Anglesey. Three crew were rescued by the lifeboat № 5 (United Kingdom).

== 14 October ==
List of shipwrecks: 14 October 1847
Ship	State	Description
Bonaparte	France	The steamship was run into by the steamship Comte de Paris (France and sank in the Mediterranean Sea off Capraia, Grand Duchy of Tuscany with the loss of three of her crew. Her passengers and surviving crew were rescued by Comte de Paris. Bonaparte was on a voyage from Marseille, Bouches-du-Rhône to Livorno, Grand Duchy of Tuscany.
Charlotte Letitia	Sweden	The ship ran aground on the Cross Sand, in the North Sea off the coast of Norfolk, United Kingdom. She was on a voyage from Gävle to London, United Kingdom. She was refloated and taken in to Great Yarmouth, Norfolk in a waterlogged condition.
Georgina	United Kingdom	The ship was wrecked 5 nautical miles (9.3 km) north west of the Memory Rock. She was on a voyage from Matanzas, Cuba to London.
John Souchay	United Kingdom	The ship was driven ashore and severely damaged at Launceston, Van Diemen's Land.
Success	United Kingdom	The smack was abandoned off Aberavon, Glamorgan and subsequently foundered.

== 15 October ==
List of shipwrecks: 15 October 1847
Ship	State	Description
Anna Margaretta	Hamburg	The ship foundered in the North Sea off Terschelling, Friesland, Netherlands. Her crew were rescued. She was on a voyage from Middlesbrough, Yorkshire, United Kingdom to Hamburg.
Beaver	United Kingdom	The ship departed from Constantinople, Ottoman Empire for Falmouth, Cornwall. No further trace, presumed foundered with the loss of all hands.
Charles Gray	United Kingdom	The brigantine departed from Baltimore, Maryland, United States for Barbados. No further trace, presumed foundered with the loss of all hands.
Elizabeth Mary Ann	United Kingdom	The schooner was in collision with the brig Flirt (United Kingdom) and was abandoned off Málaga, Spain. She was subsequently boarded by the mate of Flirt and taken in to Almería, Spain.
Portland	United Kingdom	The ship was struck a sunken rock whilst she was on a voyage from Glasgow, Renfrewshire to Liverpool, Lancashire. She put in to Oban, Argyllshire in a leaky condition.
Reliance	United Kingdom	The ship was lost at Fortune Bay, Newfoundland, British North America. She was on a voyage from Quebec City, Province of Canada, British North America to an English port.

== 16 October ==
List of shipwrecks: 16 October 1847
Ship	State	Description
Anne	United Kingdom	The ship ran aground on the Arklow Bank, in the Irish Sea off the coast of County Wicklow. She was on a voyage from London to Belfast, County Antrim. She was refloated on 18 October and resumed her voyage.
Auguste	Sweden	The schooner was wrecked on the Carl Reef, off the coast of Denmark. Her crew were rescued. She was on a voyage from Stettin to Horten, Norway.
Charles Gray	United States	The brigantine departed from Baltimore, Maryland for Barbados or Bermuda. No further trace, presumed foundered with the loss of all hands.
Isabella	United Kingdom	The ship caught fire and sank in Tibbit's Cove, British North America.
Linda	Spain	The brig was driven ashore and wrecked at Montevideo, Uruguay.
Richardson	United Kingdom	The ship was driven ashore and wrecked at Montevideo.

== 17 October ==
List of shipwrecks: 17 October 1847
Ship	State	Description
Ariadne	United Kingdom	The ship was driven ashore near Libava, Courland Governorate. She was on a voyage from Arbroath, Forfarshire to Ventspils, Russia.
Belle of Maitland	United Kingdom	The ship capsized in the Atlantic Ocean. She was abandoned on 20 October. Her crew were rescued by Joven Victoriane (Spain). Belle of Maitland was on a voyage from Saint John, New Brunswick, British North America to Barbados.
Eagle	Brazil	The polacca was abandoned in the Atlantic Ocean. Her crew were rescued by Pickwick (United Kingdom). Eagle was on a voyage from Rio de Janeiro to Montevideo, Uruguay.
Ghika	(United Kingdom of Great Britain and Ireland) Cape Colony	The schooner was lost at the mouth of the Buffalo River with the loss of all nineteen of her crew.

== 18 October ==
List of shipwrecks: 18 October 1847
Ship	State	Description
Æolus	Denmark	The ship was driven ashore near "Vedbeck". She was refloated.
Ariadne	United Kingdom	The ship was driven ashore near Liebau, Prussia. She was on a voyage from Arbroath, Forfarshire to Ventava, Courland Governorate. She subsequently became a wreck.
Jeune Alcide	France	The ship was wrecked near Le Conquet, Finistère. She was on a voyage from Rouen, Seine-Inférieure to Bordeaux, Gironde.
Kelsick Wood	United Kingdom	The ship was driven ashore at Berbice, British Guiana.
Mercur	Prussia	The ship was driven ashore on Anholt, Denmark. She was on a voyage from Danzig to London, United Kingdom. She was refloated and resumed her voyage.

== 19 October ==
List of shipwrecks: 19 October 1847
Ship	State	Description
Anne	United Kingdom	The schooner was damaged by an explosion of coal gas at Sunderland, County Durham. Two crew were injured.
Busy	United Kingdom	The ship was driven ashore and wrecked on Anholt, Denmark. Her crew survived. She was on a voyage from Riga, Russia to Bridgwater, Somerset. The wreck sank on 1 December.
Elizabeth	(United Kingdom of Great Britain and Ireland) New Zealand	The ship departed from Auckland for Port Nicholson. No further trace, presumed foundered with the loss of all hands.
Familien	Norway	The schooner was driven ashore and wrecked at Pulteneytown, Caithness, United Kingdom.

== 20 October ==
List of shipwrecks: 20 October 1847
Ship	State	Description
Ann	United Kingdom	The ship was driven ashore near Wells-next-the-Sea, Norfolk. She was on a voyage from Newcastle upon Tyne, Northumberland to London. She was refloated and resumed her voyage.
Curlew	United Kingdom	The brig ran aground on the Gunfleet Sand, in the North Sea off the coast of Essex. She was on a voyage from Sunderland, County Durham to London. She was refloated with the assistance of several smacks and taken in to Harwich, Essex.
King	United Kingdom	The brig ran aground on the Barber Sand, in the North Sea off the coast of Norfolk. She was refloated.
Novelle Pacifique	France	The ship was wrecked off Paimbœuf, Loire-Inférieure. She was on a voyage from Seaham, County Durham to Bordeaux, Gironde.

== 21 October ==
List of shipwrecks: 21 October 1847
Ship	State	Description
Faith	United Kingdom	The ship was wrecked in the Farne Islands, Northumberland. Her crew were rescued. She was on a voyage from Glasgow, Renfrewshire to Newcastle upon Tyne, Northumberland.
Industry	United Kingdom	The brig ran aground off Amrum, Duchy of Holstein. She was on a voyage from Sunderland, County Durham to Hamburg. She was refloated and beached at Wyk auf Föhr.
Juno	Danzig	The brig was wrecked on the Fahlada Reef, in the Baltic Sea. She was on a voyage from Memel, Prussia to London, United Kingdom.

== 22 October ==
List of shipwrecks: 22 October 1847
Ship	State	Description
Chance	United Kingdom	The schooner departed from Glasgow, Renfrewshire for Belfast, County Antrim. She subsequently foundered in the Irish Sea off Islandmagee, County Antrim with the loss of all hands. A message in a bottle washed up at Carrickfergus, County Antrim on 8 March 1848 confirming the loss of the vessel.
Delight	United Kingdom	The sloop was driven ashore and abandoned at Wells-next-the-Sea, Norfolk. She was refloated on 24 October and taken in to Blakeney, Norfolk.
Mustapha	India	The ship ran aground on the Western Ghaut Bank.
Sylvia	United Kingdom	The ship ran aground and was damaged at Cork. She was on a voyage from Cork to the Bristol Channel. She was refloated and towed to Cork.

== 23 October ==
List of shipwrecks: 23 October 1847
Ship	State	Description
Charlotte McKenzie	United Kingdom	The sloop was dismasted and abandoned off the Bass Rock, in the Firth of Forth. She was subsequently taken in to Eyemouth, Berwickshire.
Elizabeth	(United Kingdom of Great Britain and Ireland) British North America	The ship was lost near L'Ardoise, Nova Scotia.
Haidee	United Kingdom	The ship ran aground in the Bahamas. She was refloated on 31 October and resumed her voyage to Liverpool, Lancashire.
Hebe	United Kingdom	The ship was wrecked in the Exploits River. She was on a voyage from Hamburg to Twillingate, Newfoundlnd, British North America.
Java	(United Kingdom of Great Britain and Ireland) British North America	The ship was driven ashore on Seal Island, Nova Scotia and was abandoned. She was on a voyage from Saint John, New Brunswick to Liverpool. She subsequently floated off, and was taken in to Saint John by Thetis (United Kingdom).
Johanna Caroline	Stettin	The ship was wrecked at Hela, Prussia. She was on a voyage from Stettin to Pillau, Prussia.
Staindrop	United Kingdom	The brig was wrecked on Scharhörn. Her crew were rescued. She was on a voyage from Sunderland, County Durham to Hamburg.
Tom Tough	United Kingdom	The ship was wrfecked on the Tegeler Platte, in the Weser. Her crew were rescued. She was on a voyage from Stockton-on-Tees, County Durham to Hamburg.
Two Brothers	United Kingdom	The schooner was driven ashore and wrecked at Thisted, Denmark.
Violet	United Kingdom	The steamship was run into by the steamship Ocean and ran aground at Newquay, Cornwall. She was refloated.

== 24 October ==
List of shipwrecks: 24 October 1847
Ship	State	Description
Æolus	Netherlands	The ship was wrecked on the Riggel, off Texel, North Holland. She was on a voyage from Amsterdam, North Holland to Hamburg.
Alida	Netherlands	The ship departed from Riga, Russia to Helsingør, Denmark. No further trace, presumed foundered with the loss of all hands.
Caithnesshire	United Kingdom	The barque was driven ashore and severely damaged at Duck Island, New Jersey, United States. She was on a voyage from Belfast, County Antrim to New York, United States. Caithnesshire was refloated on 1 January 1848 and towed in to New York.
Catherine	United Kingdom	The brig was driven ashore at Budleigh Salterton, Devon. she was on a voyage from South Shields, County Durham to Budleigh Salterton. She was refloated on 21 December and taken in to the River Exe.
Hercules	Netherlands	The ship departed from Danzig for Amsterdam, North Holland. No further trace, presumed foundered with the loss of all hands.
Sovereign	United Kingdom	The ship ran aground on the Cockle Sand, in the North Sea off the coast of Norfolk.
Unknown		The lugger, the former Little Catherine was wrecked around Longitude 16½° in the Gulf of Tonquin on the coast of Cochinchina.

== 25 October ==
List of shipwrecks: 25 October 1847
Ship	State	Description
Concordia	Prussia	The ship sank off Bornholm, Denmark. Her crew were rescued. She was on a voyage from Rügenwalde to King's Lynn, Norfolk, United Kingdom.
Conservative	United Kingdom	The brig was wrecked off "Hanko, Finland". Her crew were rescued. She was on a voyage from London to Kronstadt, Russia.
Eleanora	United Kingdom	The ship ran aground and was wrecked on the Skagen Reef. She was on a voyage from Riga, Russia to Liverpool, Lancashire.
Elizabeth	Belgium	The ship was driven ashore in the Scheldt. She was on a voyage from Antwerp to Terneuzen, Zeeland, Netherlands.
Frau Gretje	Netherlands	The ship departed from Bremen for Amsterdam, North Holland. No further trace, presumed foundered with the loss of all hands.
Merchant	United Kingdom	The ship ran aground and was severely damaged at Margate, Kent.
Spruce	United Kingdom	The ship ran aground on the Domesnes Reef, in the Baltic Sea off the coast of Russia. She was on a voyage from Liverpool to Riga.
Zaida	Hamburg	The ship ran aground and was severely damaged in the Elbe at the Grauerort fortress. She was on a voyage from Havana, Cuba to Hamburg.

== 26 October ==
List of shipwrecks: 26 October 1847
Ship	State	Description
Anna Margaretha	Hamburg	The ship was wrecked on Eierland, North Holland, Netherlands. She was on a voyage form Cardiff, Glamorgan, United Kingdom to Hamburgh.
Euphrasia	Austrian Empire	The barque ran aground and was severely damaged at Galway, United Kingdom. She was refloated.
Hendrika	Netherlands	The galiot was driven ashore at Nagara Point, in the Dardanelles. She was on a voyage from Amsterdam, North Holland to Odesa.
Mechanic	United States	The ship was dismasted and abandoned in the Atlantic Ocean. Her crew were rescued.
Midas	United Kingdom	The ship was driven ashore on Campobello Island, New Brunswick, British North America. She was on a voyage from London to Saint John, New Brunswick, British North America. She was later refloated.
Nadesta	Russia	The ship was wrecked off Tenedos, Ottoman Empire. She was on a voyage from Constantinople, Ottoman Empire to Marseille, Bouches-du-Rhône, France.
Prince Llewellyn	United Kingdom	The ship sprang a leak and was abandoned in the Mediterranean Sea (34°00′N 17°30′E). Her crew were rescued by Lady of the Lake (United Kingdom). Prince Llewellyn was on a voyage from Ibrail, Ottoman Empire to Cork or Falmouth, Cornwall.
Susan	United Kingdom	The ship was wrecked at Sulina, Ottoman Empire. Her crew were rescued.

== 27 October ==
List of shipwrecks: 27 October 1847
Ship	State	Description
Ottawa	(United Kingdom of Great Britain and Ireland) British North America	The ship departed from Quebec City, Province of Canada for Bridgwater, Somerset. Presumed subsequently foundered with the loss of all hands; a nameboard from the ship was discovered on 3 December off Nash Point, Glamorgan
Robins	United Kingdom	The ship was abandoned in the Atlantic Ocean. Her crew were rescued by Ann (Spain). Robins was on a voyage from Berbice, British Guiana to the Clyde.
Tribune	United Kingdom	The screw steamer was wrecked at Carnsore Point, County Wexford. Her crew were rescued. She was on a voyage from London to Dublin.

== 28 October ==
List of shipwrecks: 28 October 1847
Ship	State	Description
Amity	United Kingdom	The barque was abandoned in the Atlantic Ocean with the loss of six of her 38 crew. Survivors were rescued by Jenny Lind (United Kingdom). Amity was on a voyage from Richibucto, New Brunswick, British North America to Liverpool, Lancashire.
Cambria	United Kingdom	The barque was abandoned in the Atlantic Ocean with the loss of four of her crew. Fourteen survivors were rescued by the barque William and Mary (United Kingdom). Cambria was on a voyage from Quebec City, Province of Canada, British North America to Gloucester.
Charlotte McKenzie	United Kingdom	The sloop was dismasted and abandoned off the Bass Rock, in the Firth of Forth. She was subsequently taken in to Eyemouth, Berwickshire.
Dammuris	United Kingdom	The ship ran aground off Long Island, in the Gulf of Smyrna.
Gratitude	United Kingdom	The ship was driven ashore and wrecked at Ventava, Courland Governorate. Her crew were rescued by Lucy and Brenda (United Kingdom). Gratitude was on a voyage from Dundee, Forfarshire to Ventspils.
Rhoda	United Kingdom	The ship was driven ashore at St. James's Castle, in the Gulf of Smyrna. She was refloated.
Weser	Bremen	The ship ran aground and was damaged at North Shields, County Durham, United Kingdom.

== 29 October ==
List of shipwrecks: 29 October 1847
Ship	State	Description
Garland	United Kingdom	The brig ran aground and was damaged on the Upgang Rock. She was on a voyage from Sunderland to Hartlepool, County Durham. She was refloated and towed back to Sunderland.
Napier	(United Kingdom of Great Britain and Ireland) Jersey	The ship ran aground near Teignmouth, Devon.
Retrieve	United States	The schooner was in collision with another vessel and foundered. She was on a voyage from Maitland, Nova Scotia, British North America to Salem, Massachusetts.

== 30 October ==
List of shipwrecks: 30 October 1847
Ship	State	Description
Providence	United Kingdom	The ship was driven ashore near Porthcawl, Glamorgan. She was on a voyage from Aberystwyth, Carmarthenshire to Porthcawl.

== Unknown date ==
List of shipwrecks: Unknown date in October 1847
Ship	State	Description
Adelaide	United Kingdom	The ship was driven ashore in Pridmouth Bay. She was refloated on 12 October and towed in to Fowey, Cornwall.
Alexander	United Kingdom	The ship was wrecked on Öland, Sweden before 9 October. She was on a voyage from Newcastle upon Tyne, Northumberland to Saint Petersburg, Russia.
Argo	United States	Carrying a cargo of furs and United States Army supplies, the 41-gross register ton sternwheel paddle steamer struck a snag and sank in the Mississippi River just above Winona, Minnesota, near a small island which thereafter was known as Argo Island. Her steam engine, boiler, and cargo were salvaged.
Arispe	United States	The schooner was driven ashore at Veracruz, Mexico between 24 and 29 October.
Caledonia	United Kingdom	The barque capsized and sank at Norfolk, Virginia, United States.
Ceres	Flag unknown	The ship was abandoned in the North Sea before 12 October.
Conservative	United Kingdom	The ship ran aground off Öland, Sweden before 12 October. She was on a voyage from London to Kronstadt Russia. She was refloated and resumed her voyage.
Cottingham	United Kingdom	The ship ran aground on the Shipwash Sand, in the North Sea off the coast of Essex. She was refloated with the assistance of eight smacks but subsequently sank. One person died rendering assistance.
Delight	United Kingdom	The sloop was driven ashore near Wells-next-the-Sea, Norfolk in a derelict condition. She was refloated on 24 October and taken in to Blakeney, Norfolk.
Diligence	United Kingdom	The brig was wrecked on the Kentish Knock. Her crew were rescued by HMRC Scout ( Board of Customs ).
Eleanor	United Kingdom	The ship was wrecked on the Gunfleet Sand, in the North Sea off the coast of Essex. Her crew were rescued.
Enterprise	United Kingdom	The steamship ran aground on the Oyster Bank, off the coast of Arakan, Burma and was severely damaged. She was refloated and put in to Akyab.
Equity	United Kingdom	The ship was abandoned in the Atlantic Ocean before 31 October.
General Graham	United Kingdom	The ship was abandoned in the Atlantic Ocean and subsequently foundered 40 nautical miles (74 km) west of Ireland.
George Palmer	United Kingdom	The ship was wrecked on Öland before 9 October. Her crew were rescued. She was on a voyage from Blyth, Northumberland to Saint Petersburg.
Harriet	(United Kingdom of Great Britain and Ireland) Cape Colony	The ship was in collision with the wreck of Ghika ( (United Kingdom of Great Britain and Ireland) Cape Colony at the mouth of the Buffalo River before 30 October. She was severely damaged and was consequently condemned.
Ingeborg Caroline	Flag unknown	The ship was driven ashore before 23 October. She was refloated and taken in to "Hourdel".
Isabella	United Kingdom	The brig ran aground in the Thanlwin River. She was on a voyage from Moulmein, Burma to Mauritius. She was refloated and resumed her voyage.
Jane	United Kingdom	The ship was run down and sunk by the brig Dolphin (United Kingdom) off the coast of Essex. Her crew were rescued by Dolphin.
Jane and Eliza	(United Kingdom of Great Britain and Ireland) New South Wales	The schooner was wrecked 12 nautical miles (22 km) north of Sydney Heads with the loss of a crew member.
Leo	United Kingdom	The ship was wrecked on Cape Breton Island, Nova Scotia, British North America with the loss of a crew member. She was on a voyage from Liverpool, Lancashire to Quebec City, Province of Canada, British North America.
Lord Wellington	United Kingdom	The ship was abandoned in the Atlantic Ocean before 2 October.
Maria	Sweden	The ship was wrecked near Helsingør, Denmark. She was on a voyage from Stockholm to Bremen. She may have been stranded on Anholt. If so, the wreck sank on 1 December.
Mary Leonore	(United Kingdom of Great Britain and Ireland) British North America	The schooner was wrecked at Fox River, Nova Scotia with the loss of all hands. She was on a voyage from Quebec City to the Magdalen Islands, Nova Scotia.
Pomona	United Kingdom	The ship was wrecked on the coast of Grand Bassa, Liberia before 15 October.
Rapid	(United Kingdom of Great Britain and Ireland) Jersey	The ship was lost near "Nunez", South America before 2 October.
Richard	United Kingdom	The ship was driven ashore at Drogheda, County Louth. She was refloated on 13 October and taken in to Drogheda.
Scandia	Sweden	The barque ran aground on the Sunk Sand, in the North Sea off the coast of Essed. She was refloated and assisted in to Harwich, Essex by six smacks.
Shamrock	United Kingdom	The sloop was driven ashore at Hauxley Head, Northumberland before 20 October. She was on a voyage from Kirkcaldy, Fife to Great Yarmouth, Norfolk. She was refloated and taken in to Warkworth, Northumberland, where she was repaired.
Sultana	United Kingdom	The ship was driven ashore at Sulina, Ottoman Empire. She was refloated and taken in to Constantinople for repairs.
Tinamura	United Kingdom	The ship was driven ashore on the coast of Empire of Brazil. She was on a voyage from Liverpool to Ceará and Maranhão, Brazil. She was refloated and taken in to Maranhão for repairs. She arrived on 8 October.
Two Brothers	United Kingdom	The brig was abandoned in the Atlantic Ocean before 20 October.
Virginius	United Kingdom	The ship was abandoned in the Atlantic Ocean before 11 October. Eleven crew were rescued by Caithnesshire (United Kingdom).
Unknown name	(United Kingdom of Great Britain and Ireland) New Zealand	A Māori whaling boat was lost en route from Hawke's Bay to Tauranga in early October, with the loss of all 30 hands, among them Rangatira Te Akiwa.
