= Mariakerke, West Flanders =

Coordinates: 51°12′42″N 2°52′17″E

Mariakerke (Dutch pronunciation: [maːˈrijaːˌkɛrkə]) is a seaside resort in the West Flanders province of Belgium. Previously a village of its own just to the west of Ostend, it now forms part of that town.

== History ==
The oldest reference to the town dates to 1171, when it is called S. Mariae Capella.
