= Grauerort fortress =

Museum in Germany

- near Stade, Germany
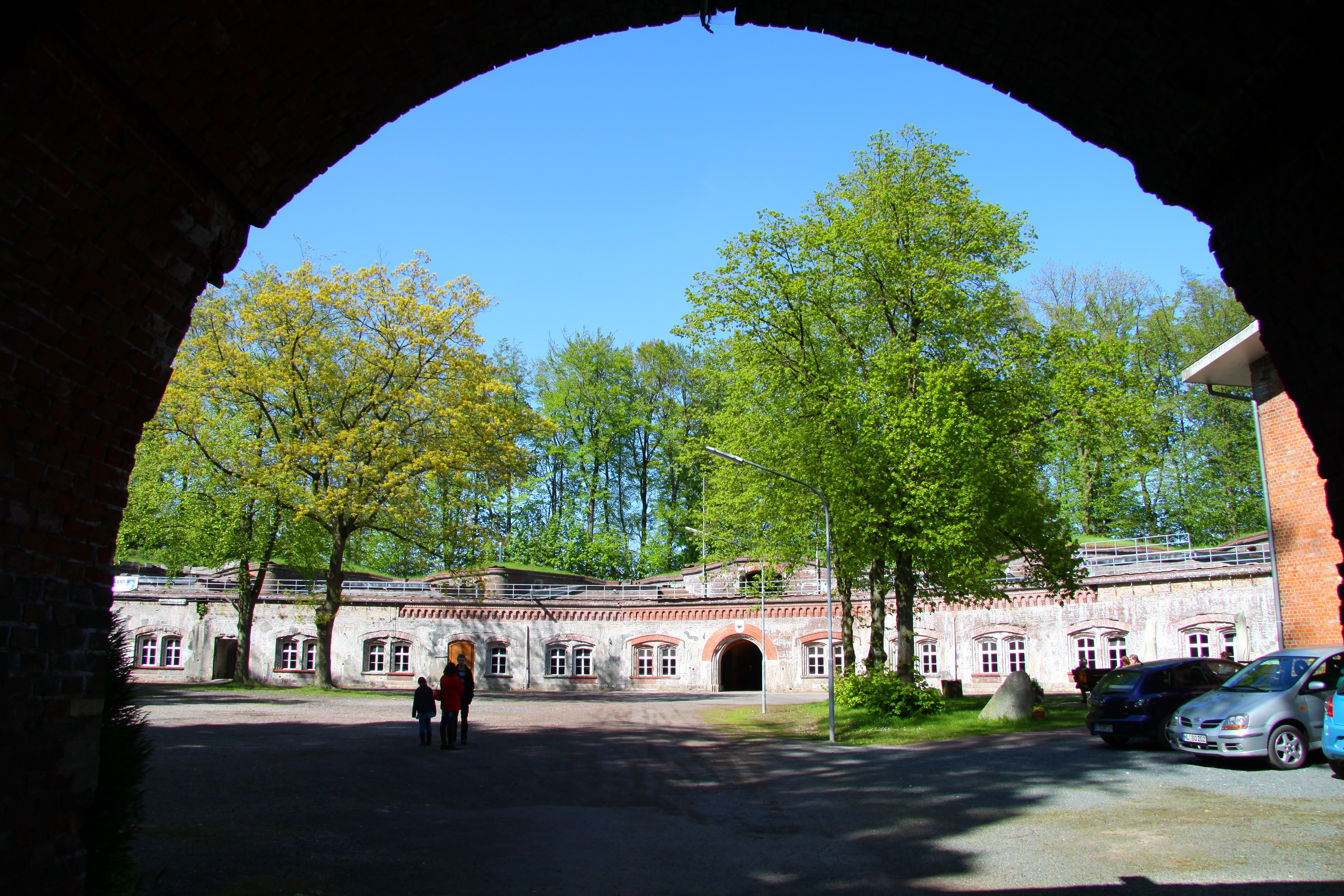
- View from entrance tunnel towards casemates

Site information
- Type: Artillery fort
- Controlled by: Germany; UK (1945–1958)

Location
- Location in Lower Saxony, Germany Grauerort fortress (Germany)
- Coordinates: 53.6777°N 9.4902°E

Site history
- Built: 1869–1879
- In use: 1870/71–1895 artillery fort 1914–1945 naval mine arsenal 1945–1958 refugee shelter 1959–1985 decommissioning plant for guns and ammunition 1998– museum
- Materials: Cement and brick
- Battles/wars: none

Grauerort fortress is a German artillery fort on Elbe river about 9 km (5.6 mi) north of Stade which was built between 1869 and 1879 to defend the Port of Hamburg. Its shape is hexagonal, taking advantage of the topography of the area and the location of the previously existing levee. The main armament of the fort were probably ten 21 cm breech-loading guns (as opposed to the initially planned four 28 cm and six 21 cm guns), but they are no longer in place. There were also 4 12 cm and six 9 cm guns. Construction materials were cement and brick; concrete was only used from 1885 onward.

While the fortress was in service during the Franco-Prussian War in 1870–71, it was never involved in any battles. After World War I, Grauerort was converted to a naval mine arsenal. Unused since 1985, it has been mostly restored to its original 19th-century state since 1997, and now serves as a museum and cultural venue.

Grauerort has a 250 m Elbe pier which was used to load ships with naval mines. After WW II, a popular restaurant, Klein Helgoland ("Little Heligoland"), was located on the pier. Its popularity was because until 1955, Heligoland was off-limits to passenger ships, therefore people from Hamburg visited Klein Helgoland instead on their day trips.

Between 1959 and 1985, decommissioning of ammunition took place in Grauerort. 1992 and 1995 chemical analyses of the soil at Grauerort revealed significant concentrations of, among others, PCNs, TNT, RDX, and cadmium up to a depth of 3 m, raising the concern that hazardous substances could leach into the local groundwater supply.

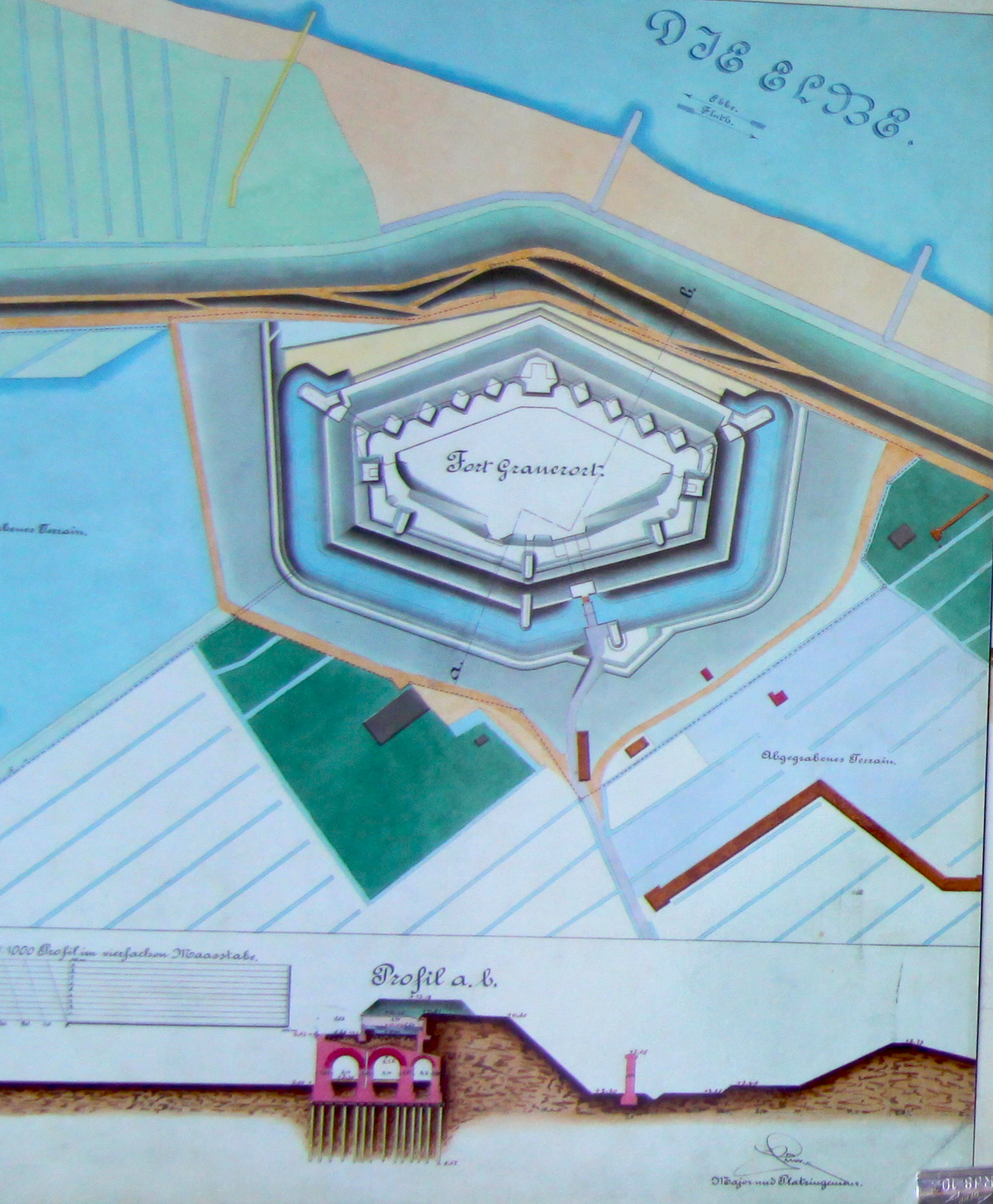
Construction plan, with the river Elbe at the top of the map. The vertical profile at the bottom shows the wall towards the Elbe and the casemates.

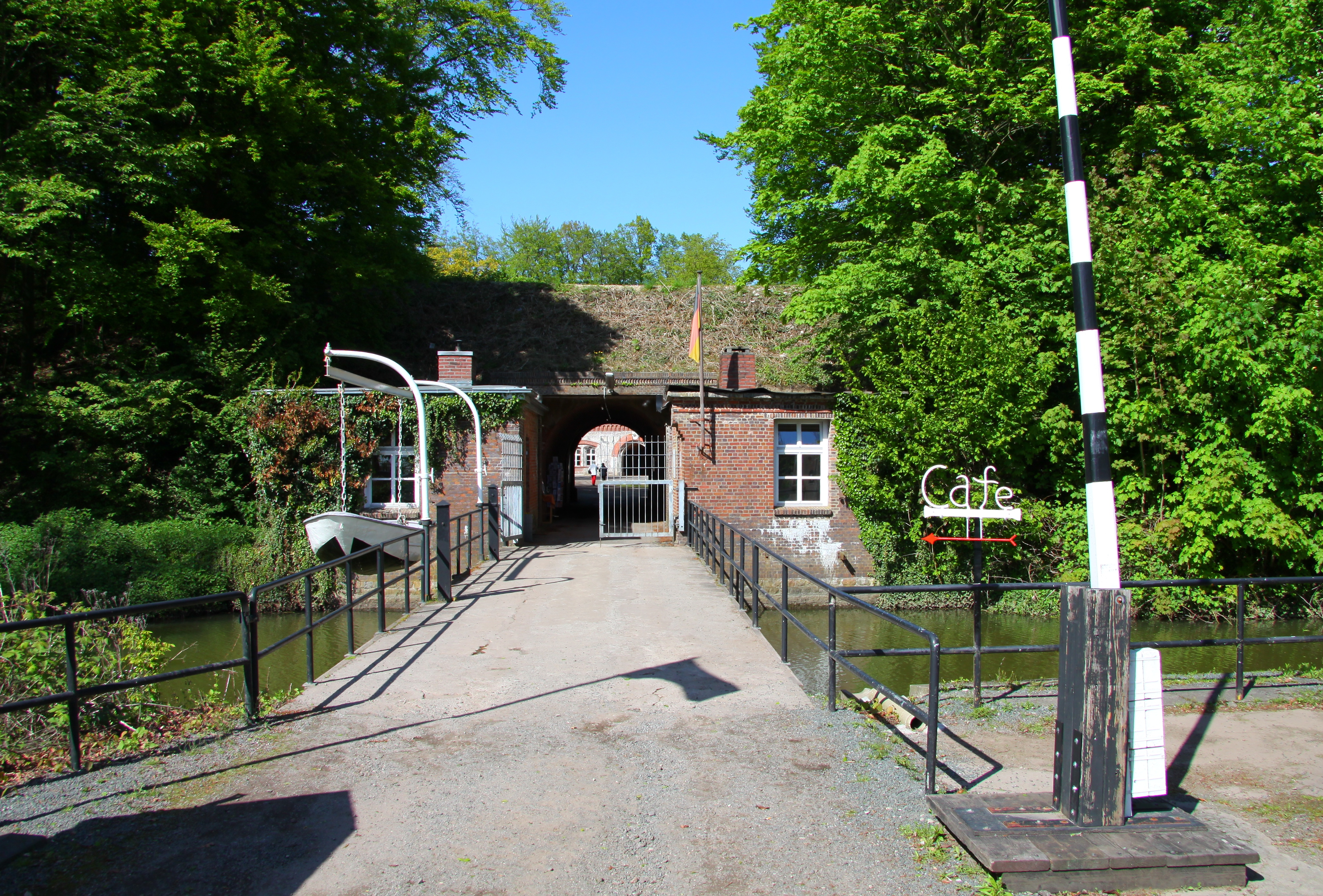
Entrance with bridge. It was initially a wooden drawbridge and was later redone using concrete.

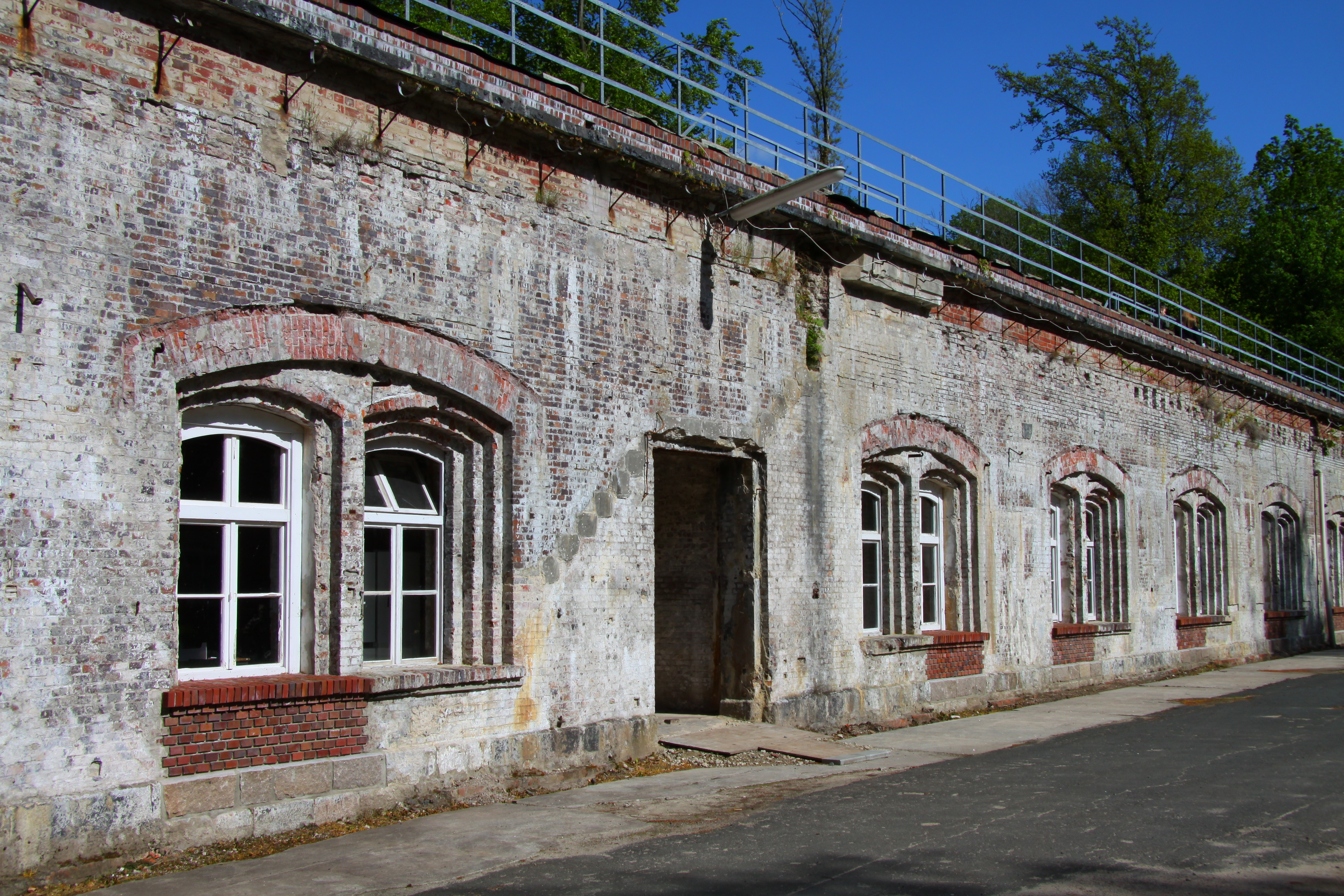
Facade with newly restored windows

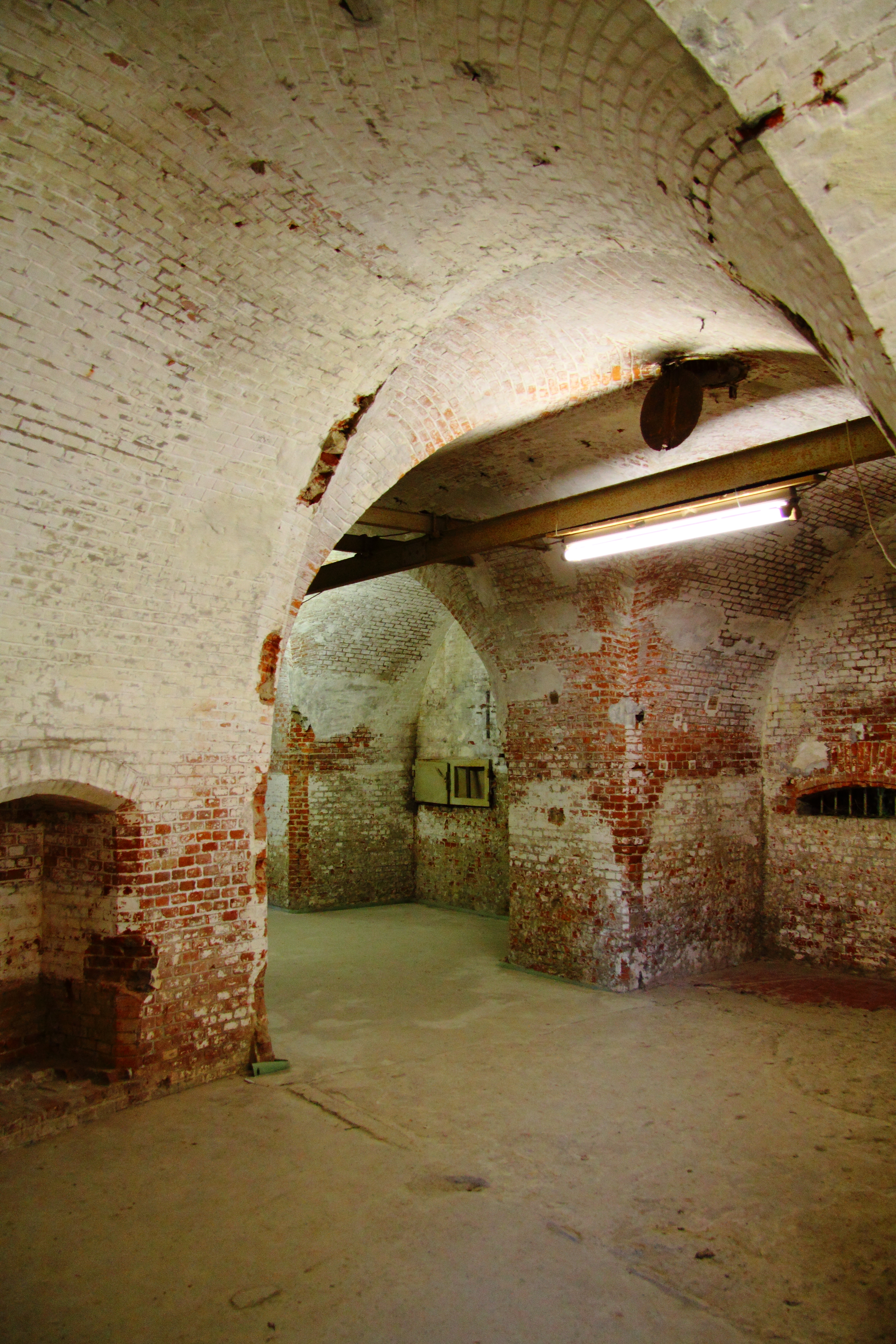
Casemate. The walls were formerly lined with peat and gypsum plaster for thermal insulation.

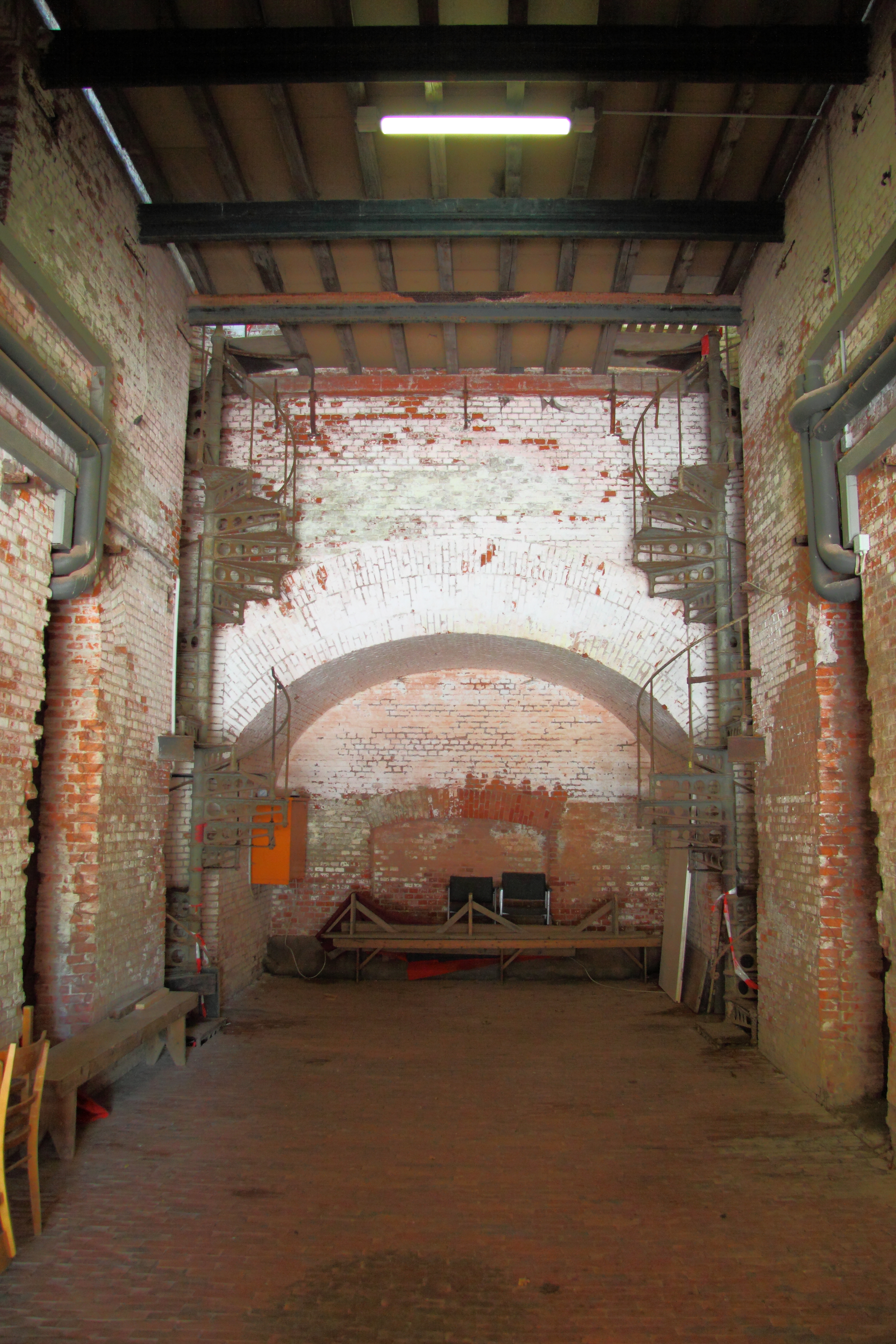
Main bunker entrance with original 19th-century iron staircases to the left and right

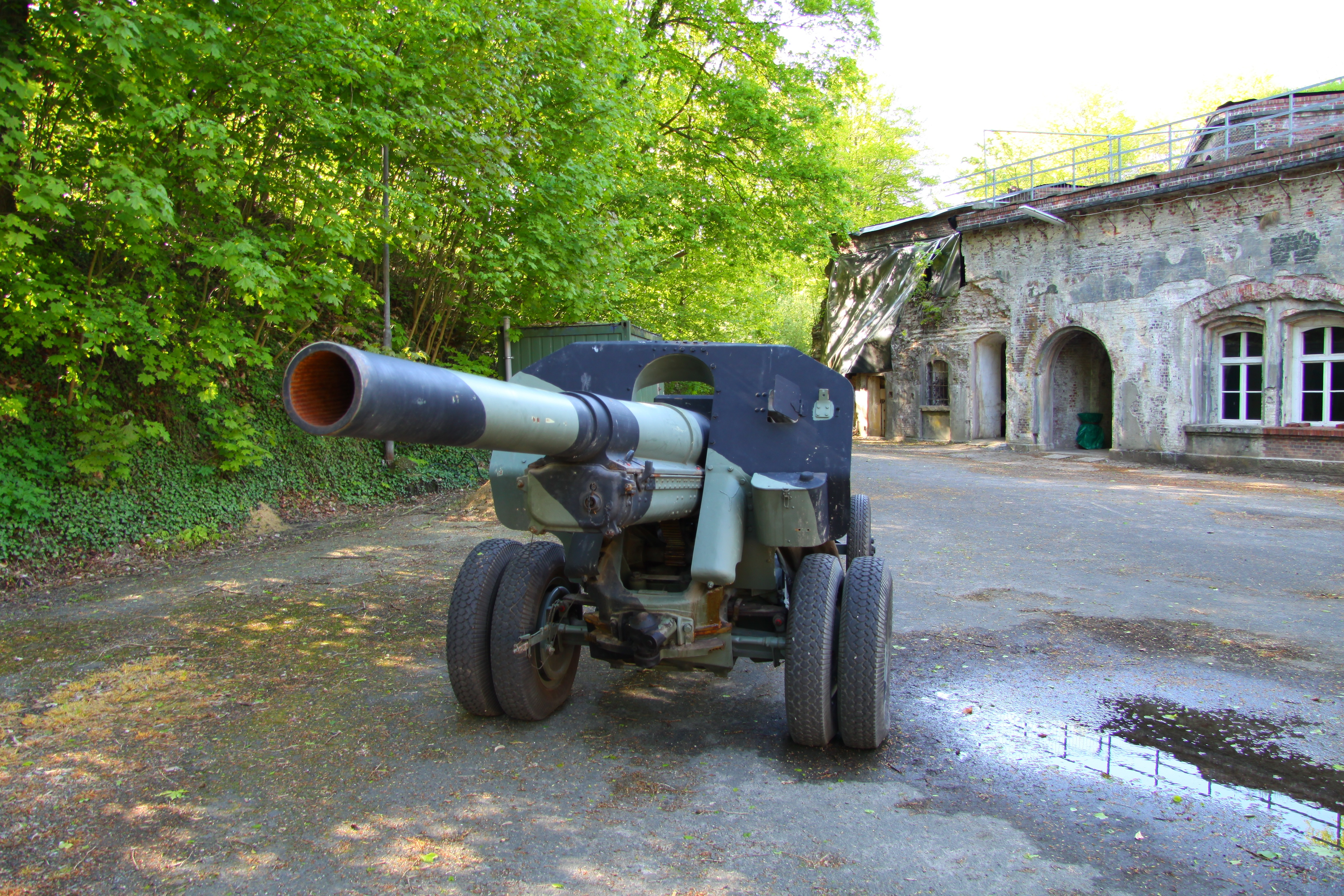
20th-century gun in the fortress yard

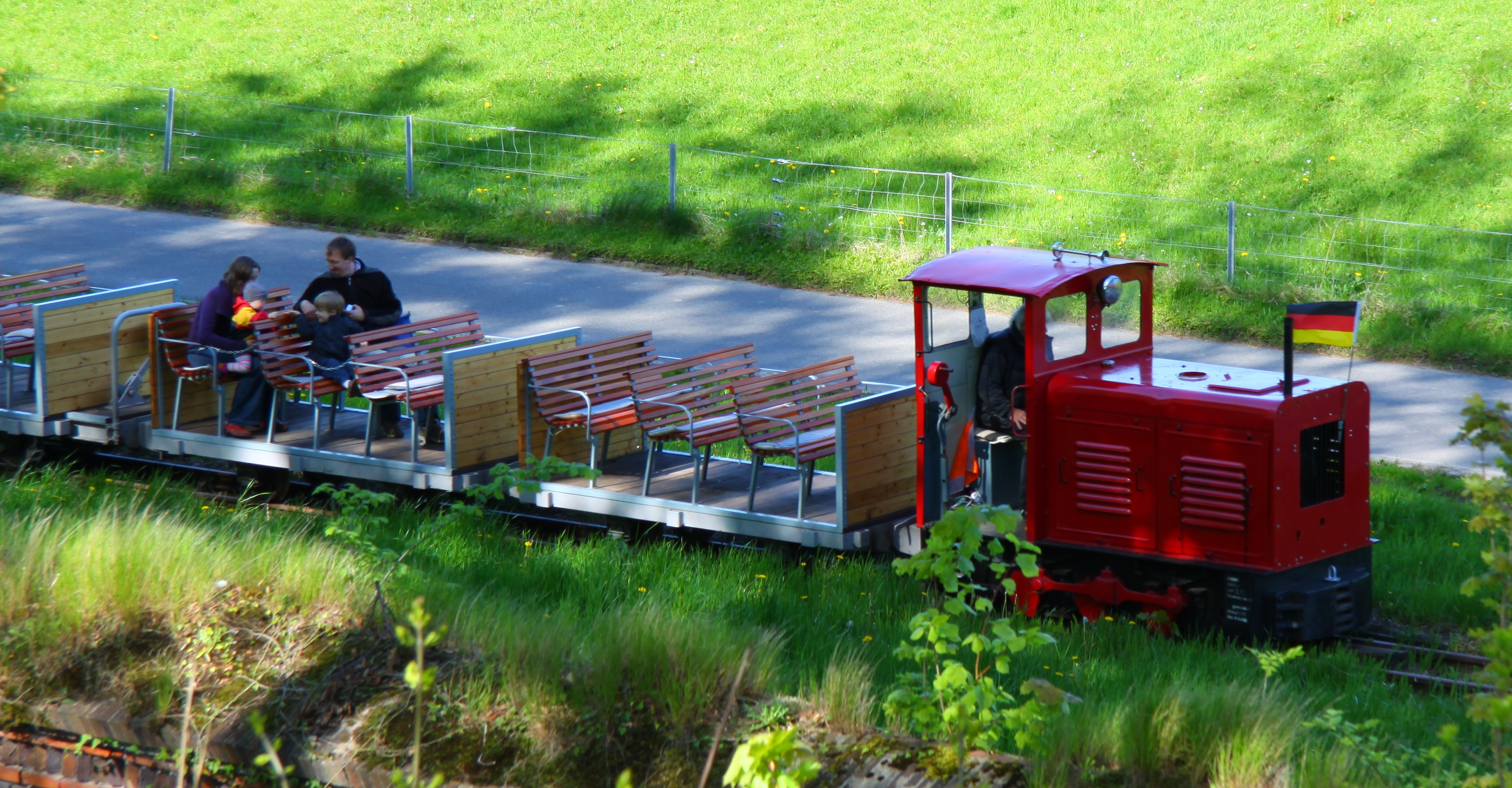
Narrow gauge train; previously used to transport naval mines
