= List of shipwrecks in December 1821 =

The list of shipwrecks in December 1821 includes ships sunk, foundered, grounded, or otherwise lost during December 1821.

== 1 December ==
List of shipwrecks: 1 December 1821
Ship	State	Description
Alexander	United Kingdom	The brig was damaged at Limerick.
Alpha	United Kingdom	The ship was damaged at Limerick.
Beresford	United Kingdom	The ship departed from St. John's, Newfoundland, British North America, for Waterford. No further trace, presumed foundered with the loss of all hands.
Betsey	United Kingdom	The ship was driven ashore at Milford Haven, Pembrokeshire. She was on a voyage from Bristol, Gloucestershire, to Guernsey, Channel Islands.
Baltic	United Kingdom	The ship was damaged at Whitehaven, Cumberland.
Brown	United Kingdom	The ship was damaged at Whitehaven.
Carthagena	Netherlands	The ship was driven ashore and wrecked on Scharhörn, Hamburg with the loss of all hands. She was on a voyage from Puerto Rico to Amsterdam, North Holland.
Chance	United Kingdom	The brig was damaged at Limerick.
Concord	United Kingdom	The ship was driven ashore on Bornholm, Denmark. She was on a voyage from Riga, Russia, to London. Concord was later refloated and taken into harbour at Bornholm.
Demerara	United Kingdom	The ship was damaged at Limerick.
Fair Hibernian	United Kingdom	The ship was driven ashore in the Eider. She was on a voyage from Newcastle upon Tyne, Northumberland, to Altona.
Fortitude	United Kingdom	The ship was damaged at Limerick.
Fortune	United Kingdom	The ship was damaged at Whitehaven.
Friends	United Kingdom	The ship departed from St. John's, Newfoundland, for Waterford. No further trace, presumed foundered with the loss of all hands.
Harriet	United Kingdom	The brig was wrecked on Ginger Key, off the coast of Cuba. Her crew were rescued.
Henry	United Kingdom	The ship was driven ashore at Whitehaven.
Hero	United Kingdom	The ship sank at Whitehaven.
Honest Miller	United Kingdom	The smack was driven ashore and wrecked at Whitehaven with the loss of all but one of the eighteen people on board. She was on a voyage from Liverpool, Lancashire, to Ardglass, County Down via Peel, Isle of Man and Killough, County Down.
Jean	United Kingdom	The ship was driven ashore between Carswall Point and Port Patrick, Wigtownshire. Her crew were rescued.
Kitty	United Kingdom	The ship was damaged at Whitehaven.
Leeds	United Kingdom	The ship was damaged when Mountaineer (United Kingdom) was driven into her at Limerick. Leeds subsequently drove into London Packet (United Kingdom).
Levant	United Kingdom	The ship was driven ashore on Texel, North Holland, Netherlands. She was on a voyage from Amsterdam, North Holland, to Liverpool.
London Packet	United Kingdom	The ship was damaged when Leeds (United Kingdom drove into her at Limerick.
Margaret	United Kingdom	The ship was damaged at Limerick.
Martin & Eliza	United Kingdom	The brig was damaged at Limerick.
Mary	United Kingdom	The brig was driven ashore at Limerick.
Mayflower	United Kingdom	The ship was driven ashore at Winterton-on-Sea, Norfolk.
Mercury	United Kingdom	The schooner was wrecked at Whitehaven with the loss of all hands.
Mercury	United Kingdom	The ship departed from Liverpool, presumed subsequently foundered in the Irish Sea with the loss of all hands.
Mountaineer	United Kingdom	The brig was driven into Leeds (United Kingdom) and damaged at Limerick.
Nimble	United Kingdom	The ship departed from Liverpool, presumed subsequently foundered in the Irish Sea with the loss of all hands.
Perseverance	United Kingdom	The ship was driven ashore and wrecked at "Duddon Foot", Cumberland with the loss of a crew member. She was on a voyage from Quebec City, Lower Canada, British North America, to Belfast, County Antrim.
Sophia	United Kingdom	The ship was damaged at Whitehaven.
Terry	United Kingdom	The brig was damaged at Limerick.
Triton	United Kingdom	The ship was driven ashore 5 nautical miles (9.3 km) south of Bootle, Lancashire. She was on a voyage from Douglas, Isle of Man, to Whitehaven. Triton was refloated on 9 January 1822 and taken in to Whitehaven.
Victory	United Kingdom	The ship was damaged at Limerick.
Vine	United Kingdom	The ship was damaged at Limerick.
William	United Kingdom	The ship was wrecked on the Duddon Sands, in the Irish Sea off the coast of Cumberland. Her crew were rescued. She was on a voyage from Liverpool to Whitehaven.

== 2 December ==
List of shipwrecks: 2 December 1821
Ship	State	Description
Catherine	Denmark	The brig was driven ashore and wrecked on Scharhörn, Hamburg with the loss of all hands.
Elizabeth	United Kingdom	The ship was driven ashore crewless and was wrecked on the Isle of Walney, Lancashire. She was on a voyage from Liverpool, Lancashire, to the Solway Firth.
Gleaner	United Kingdom	The ship departed from Newfoundland, British North America for Gibraltar. No further trace, presumed foundered with the loss of all hands.
Hazard	France	The ship was driven ashore on Heligoland. She was on a voyage from Danzig to Brest, Finistère.
Isabella	United Kingdom	The ship was driven ashore and wrecked at Southport, Lancashire. Her crew were rescued. She was on a voyage from New Orleans, Louisiana, to Liverpool.
Isabella	United Kingdom	The ship was driven ashore crewless at Southport. She was on a voyage from Liverpool to Whitehaven, Cumberland.
Lady Castlereagh	United Kingdom	The ship foundered off Madras, India. Her crew were rescued. She was on a voyage from Rangoon to Madras.
Mercury	United Kingdom	The ship was lost near Southport with the loss of all hands.
New Triton	United Kingdom	The ship was driven ashore near Ravenglass, Cumberland. All on board were rescued.
Repeater	United Kingdom	The ship was wrecked at Southport.
Union	United Kingdom	The ship was wrecked on a reef 16 leagues (48 nautical miles (89 km)) off Matanzas, Cuba. She was on a voyage from Jamaica to Liverpool, Nova Scotia, British North America.
William	United Kingdom	The brig was driven ashore and wrecked south of Ravenglass. Her crew were rescued.
Zeno	United Kingdom	The ship was driven ashore and wrecked 10 nautical miles (19 km) north of Memel, Prussia. Her crew were rescued.

== 3 December ==
List of shipwrecks: 3 December 1821
Ship	State	Description
Amarantha	Spanish Navy	The Brig of War was wrecked on the Double-headed Shot Rocks, in the Caribbean Sea, with the loss of five of her 120 crew.
Friends	United Kingdom	The ship was lost near Southport, Lancashire. She was on a voyage from Waterford to Liverpool, Lancashire.
Hannah	United Kingdom	The ship was driven ashore on Carnals Point, Anglesey. She was on a voyage from Dublin to Liverpool.
Latona	United Kingdom	The schooner ran aground on the Corse Bank, in the Irish Sea and capsized. Her crew were rescued.

== 4 December ==
List of shipwrecks: 4 December 1821
Ship	State	Description
Auea	United Kingdom	The ship was wrecked in Tramore Bay. Her crew were rescued. She was on a voyage from Loch Indaal to Belfast, County Antrim.
Catharina	Denmark	The brig was driven ashore and wrecked on Scharhörn, Hamburg with the loss of all hands. She was on a voyage from Puerto Rico to Amsterdam, North Holland, Netherlands.
Johanna Sophia	United Kingdom	The schooner capsized and sank at Cape Colony.
John	United Kingdom	The ship was driven ashore and wrecked at Cape Colony.
Phoenix	United States	The full-rigged ship foundered in Buzzards Bay. She was on a voyage from Gothenburg, Sweden, to New Bedford, Massachusetts.
William	United Kingdom	The ship was driven ashore at Hartlepool, County Durham. She was later refloated.

== 5 December ==
List of shipwrecks: 5 December 1821
Ship	State	Description
Ann	United Kingdom	The ship was driven ashore and wrecked on Neuwerk. She was on a voyage from London to Hamburg.
Einigkeit	Denmark	The ship foundered off Hjørring. She was on a voyage from Newcastle upon Tyne, Northumberland, United Kingdom to Copenhagen.
Friends	United Kingdom	The ship was wrecked at Southport, Lancashire. She was on a voyage from Waterford to Liverpool, Lancashire.
Manchester	United Kingdom	The ship was driven ashore and wrecked on Neuwerk. She was on a voyage from London to South Shields, County Durham.
Mary and Dorothy	United Kingdom	The ship foundered in the North Sea off Heligoland. Her crew were rescued. She was on a voyage from Sunderland, County Durham, to Hamburg.

== 6 December ==
List of shipwrecks: 6 December 1821
Ship	State	Description
Brooke	United Kingdom	The ship departed from Portsmouth, Hampshire, for Dominica. Presumed subsequently foundered in the Bay of Biscay.
Diana	(United Kingdom of Great Britain and Ireland) Guernsey	The ship departed from Guernsey for Rio de Janeiro, Brazil. No further trace, presumed foundered with the loss of all hands.
Fanny	France	The ship was lost at St. Paul's, Île Bourbon.
Hannah and Mary	United Kingdom	The collier was driven ashore at Lowestoft, Suffolk. Her crew were rescued. She was refloated the next day.
Happy Return	United Kingdom	The ship was driven ashore and wrecked at Shoreham-by-Sea, Sussex. Her crew were rescued.
Hebble	United Kingdom	The ship was driven ashore and severely damaged at Newhaven, Sussex. She was later refloated and taken in to Newhaven.
Liefde	Bremen	The ship foundered in the Zuyder Zee off Stavoren, Friesland, Netherlands. She was on a voyage from Bremen to Amsterdam, North Holland, Netherlands.
Matchless	United Kingdom	The ship departed from Workington, Cumberland, for an Irish port. No further trace, presumed foundered with the loss of all hands.
Sunton	United Kingdom	The ship foundered in the Irish Sea off Whitehaven, Cumberland, with the loss of all but one of her crew.
Two Sisters	United Kingdom	The ship was driven ashore at Shoreham-by-Sea.

== 7 December ==
List of shipwrecks: 7 December 1821
Ship	State	Description
Anne	United Kingdom	The ship was last sighted on this date whilst on a voyage from Miramichi Bay to Newcastle upon Tyne, Northumberland. Presumed subsequently foundered with the loss of all hands.
Aurora	United Kingdom	The ship was driven ashore in Kilcaton Bay, Isle of Bute. She was on a voyage from Greenock, Renfrewshire, to St. Thomas, Virgin Islands. Aurora was refloated on 26 December and taken in to the River Clyde.
Bee	United Kingdom	The sloop was wrecked near Holyhead, Anglesey. Her crew were rescued. She was on a voyage from Liverpool, Lancashire, to Cork.
Brilliant	United Kingdom	The ship was driven ashore in Glenluce Bay. She was on a voyage from Liverpool to Glasgow, Renfrewshire. Brilliant was refloated on 26 December.
Charles	United Kingdom	The ship was driven ashore and wrecked at South Shields, County Durham. All on board were rescued. She was on a voyage from Great Yarmouth, Norfolk, to South Shields.
Desiré	France	The ship was driven ashore and damaged at Blaye, Gironde. She was on a voyage from Bordeaux, Gironde, to Bristol, Gloucestershire, United Kingdom. Desiré was later refloated.
John of McDuff	United Kingdom	The ship was driven ashore at Great Yarmouth. She was on a voyage from London to Sunderland, County Durham. John of McDuff was later refloated and taken in to Great Yarmouth.
Susan	United Kingdom	The ship foundered in the Irish Sea off Waterford with the loss of one life. Survivors were rescued by Concord (United Kingdom). She was on a voyage from Ilfracombe, Devon, to Bristol.
Thomas	United Kingdom	The ship was driven ashore and wrecked at South Shields. All on board were rescued. She was on a voyage from Hull, Yorkshire, to South Shields.
Westmorland	United Kingdom	The ship was driven ashore and wrecked at Pakefield, Suffolk with the loss of four of the eight people on board. She was on a voyage from Stockton-on-Tees, Yorkshire to London.

== 8 December ==
List of shipwrecks: 8 December 1821
Ship	State	Description
Agincourt	United Kingdom	The ship was abandoned in the Atlantic Ocean (49°17′N 17°00′W). Her eighteen crew were rescued by St. Vincent (United Kingdom). Agincourt was on a voyage from Quebec City, Lower Canada, British North America, to London.
Ark	United Kingdom	The ship was driven ashore on Ameland, Friesland, Netherlands. She was on a voyage from Amsterdam, North Holland, Netherlands, to London.
Better Luck Still	United Kingdom	The ship was driven ashore on Spurn Point, Yorkshire, and was abandoned by her crew. She was on a voyage from South Shields, County Durham, to London. Better Luck Still was later refloated and taken in to Hull, Yorkshire.
Libertas	Sweden	The ship ran aground off Copenhagen, Denmark. She was on a voyage from Brazil to Stockholm. Libertas was later refloated.
Maria	United Kingdom	The ship was driven ashore at Whitehaven, Cumberland.
Pacific	United Kingdom	The ship was driven ashore crewless at Milltown Malbay, County Clare.
Young Arion	United Kingdom	The ship was lost on the Red Bank, off St. Mary's, Africa. Her crew were rescued. She was on a voyage from St. Mary's to Liverpool.

== 9 December ==
List of shipwrecks: 9 December 1821
Ship	State	Description
Endeavour	United Kingdom	The ship was driven ashore at Waterford. Her crew were rescued. She was on a voyage from Newport, Monmouthshire, to Cork.
Orion	United Kingdom	The ship sprang a leak and was abandoned in the North Sea off Spurn Point, Yorkshire, with the loss of a crew member. She was on a voyage from South Shields, County Durham, to London.
Perseverance	United Kingdom	The ship sprang a leak at Ramsgate, Kent, and was beached.

== 10 December ==
List of shipwrecks: 10 December 1821
Ship	State	Description
Pentagon	United Kingdom	The ship departed from Saint John, New Brunswick, for Barbados and Saint Vincent. No further trace, presumed foundered with the loss of all hands.
Swift	United Kingdom	The sloop was driven ashore and severely damaged at Widewall, Orkney Islands. She was refloated in February 1822 and taken in to Stromness, Orkney Islands for repairs.

== 11 December ==
List of shipwrecks: 11 December 1821
Ship	State	Description
Experiment	United Kingdom	The ship was lost near Strömstad, Sweden.
Sacra Nova de Gesu	France	The bombard was beached at Malta. She was on a voyage from "Zerbin" to Chios, Greece and Alexandria, Egypt.
Swift	United Kingdom	The ship was wrecked in the Atlantic Ocean (40°15′N 58°00′W). Her six crew were rescued by Stranger (United States). Swift was on a voyage from Nova Scotia, British North America, to Grenada.

== 12 December ==
List of shipwrecks: 12 December 1821
Ship	State	Description
Garthland	United Kingdom	The full-rigged ship was wrecked in the Atlantic Ocean. Three crew died before 19 December when the survivors were rescued by Hope (United Kingdom). Garthland was on a voyage from Saint John, New Brunswick, British North America, to London.
Lady Sherbrooke	United Kingdom	The ship was driven ashore and damaged at Figueira da Foz, Portugal.. She was on a voyage from Newfoundland, British North America to Lisbon, Portugal. Lady Sherbrooke was later refloated.

== 13 December ==
List of shipwrecks: 13 December 1821
Ship	State	Description
Betsey Jane	United States	The schooner was wrecked on Partridge Island. She was on a voyage from Passamaquoddy, Maine, to Shubenacadie, Nova Scotia, British North America.
Durham	United States	The ship was wrecked on "Orleans Beach". She was on a voyage from Jacmel, Haiti, to Portsmouth, New Hampshire
Erin	United Kingdom	The ship was driven ashore on Møn, Denmark. She was on a voyage from Saint Petersburg, Russia, to Liverpool, Lancashire. Erin was later refloated and put into Helsingør, Denmark.
Fanny	United States	The ship was driven ashore at Hampton, Virginia. She was on a voyage from Cayenne French Guiana to Gloucester, Massachusetts.
Harmony	United Kingdom	The ship was driven ashore at the mouth of the River Ribble. She was on a voyage from Dublin to Liverpool, Lancashire.
Hope	United Kingdom	The ship sank in Ballyhenry Bay. She was on a voyage from Miramichi, New Brunswick, British North America, to Newry, County Antrim.

== 14 December ==
List of shipwrecks: 14 December 1821
Ship	State	Description
Lyra	United Kingdom	The ship was driven ashore and severely damaged at Littlehampton, Sussex. She was refloated on December and taken in to Littlehampton.
Monarch	United Kingdom	The ship was driven ashore near "Pasalutor". She was on a voyage from the Clyde to New Orleans, Louisiana, United States.
Palemon	United Kingdom	The ship was wrecked off the Isles of Scilly. Three of her twelve crew were lost. Four were rescued by Dykzyt (Netherlands). Palemon was on a voyage from London to St. Thomas, Virgin Islands.
Swift	United Kingdom	The ship was abandoned in the Atlantic Ocean (40°15′N 58°00′W). Her crew were rescued by Stranger (United Kingdom). She was on a voyage from Nova Scotia, British North America, to Grenada.

== 15 December ==
List of shipwrecks: 15 December 1821
Ship	State	Description
Adolph	Hamburg	The ship ran aground on the Vogel Sand, in the North Sea. She was on a voyage from Hamburg to Havana, Cuba.
Adventure	United Kingdom	The ship was driven ashore and wrecked at Cardiff, Glamorgan. She was on a voyage from London to Aberthaw, Glamorgan.
Crowley	United Kingdom	The ship ran aground on the Black Middens, in the North Sea off Tynemouth, Northumberland. She was on a voyage from South Shields, County Durham, to London. Crowley was later refloated and taken in to South Shields.
Durham	United States	The ship was driven ashore and wrecked at Orleans, Massachusetts She was on a voyage from Jacmel, Haiti, to Portsmouth, New Hampshire.
Marianne	United Kingdom	The ship was driven ashore and wrecked at Aberavon, Glamorgan. Her crew were rescued. She was on a voyage from Cardiff to London.
Providence	United Kingdom	The ship was driven ashore and damaged at Penarth Head, Glamorgan. She was refloated in January 1822 and taken in to Cardiff for repairs.

== 16 December ==
List of shipwrecks: 16 December 1821
Ship	State	Description
Boddington	United Kingdom	The ship caught fire at Wapping, Middlesex and was scuttled.
Resolution	Sweden	The schooner was wrecked at Umago, Austrian Empire. Her crew were rescued.

== 17 December ==
List of shipwrecks: 17 December 1821
Ship	State	Description
Margaret	United Kingdom	The ship ran aground and sank at Glenarm, County Antrim.
Mary Ann	United Kingdom	The brig was abandoned in the Atlantic Ocean. Her crew were rescued by Bombay Merchant (United Kingdom). She was on a voyage from Prince Edward Island, British North America, to Maryport, Cumberland.
Three Partners	(United Kingdom of Great Britain and Ireland) British North America	The ship was wrecked on Seal Island, Nova Scotia. She was on a voyage from Saint John, New Brunswick, to Sierra Leone.
Torridge	United Kingdom	The ship was run down and sunk off Seaham, County Durham, by Commerce (United Kingdom) with the loss of a crew member.

== 18 December ==
List of shipwrecks: 18 December 1821
Ship	State	Description
Fame	United Kingdom	The ship foundered in the Atlantic Ocean off Le Conquet, Finistère, France with the loss of all hands. She was on a voyage from Lisbon, Portugal, to London.
Harmony	United Kingdom	The ship was driven ashore between Rattray Head and Scotstown Head, Aberdeenshire. She was on a voyage from Saint Petersburg, Russia, to London. Harmony was refloated in January 1822.
La Jeune Fanie	France	The ship was driven ashore and wrecked at Beachy Head, Sussex, United Kingdom with the loss of two of her six crew. She was on a voyage from Marennes, Charente-Maritime to Dunkirk, Nord.
Leven Castle	United Kingdom	The ship was driven ashore between Dunoon, Ayrshire, and the Holy Loch. She was on a voyage from Dublin to the Clyde. Leven Castle was refloated on 26 December and taken in to the Clyde.
Minerva	United Kingdom	The brig was wrecked of a reef off Horse Isle, Ardrossan, Ayrshire, with the loss of five of the eight people on board. She was on a voyage from Dublin to Glasgow, Renfrewshire.
Thomas	United Kingdom	The ship was driven ashore at Waterford. Her crew were rescued. She was on a voyage from Newfoundland, British North America, to Liverpool, Lancashire.

== 19 December ==
List of shipwrecks: 19 December 1821
Ship	State	Description
Alexander	United Kingdom	The ship was wrecked at Matosinhos, Portugal. Her crew were rescued. She was on a voyage from London to Porto, Portugal.

== 20 December ==
List of shipwrecks: 20 December 1821
Ship	State	Description
Barbara	United Kingdom	The ship was in collision with Active (United Kingdom in the North Sea and sank.
Hirondelle	United Kingdom	The ship was driven ashore at Peniche, Portugal. She was on a voyage from St. Ubes, Portugal to Havre de Grâce, Seine-Inférieure.
Jane	United Kingdom	The ship was abandoned in the Atlantic Ocean off Newfoundland, British North America with the loss of two of her crew. She was on a voyage from Richibucto, New Brunswick, British North America, to Liverpool, Lancashire.
Jenny	United Kingdom	The ship was driven ashore at the Point of Towart. She was on a voyage from the Clyde to Londonderry.
John & Margaret	United Kingdom	The ship was driven ashore at Berwick-upon-Tweed, Northumberland.
Lord Cranston	United Kingdom	The ship ran aground on the Maplin Sand, in the North Sea off the coast of Essex. She was on a voyage from London to Jamaica. Lord Cranston was refloated on 25 December and put back to the River Thames.
Matchless	United Kingdom	The ship foundered off St. Bees Head, Cumberland.
Palemon	United Kingdom	The ship was abandoned in the English Channel off The Lizard, Cornwall, with the loss of all but her captain. He was rescued by Selina and Jane (United States).
Prince Frederick	Denmark	The ship foundered in the English Channel off Land's End, Cornwall. Her crew were rescued by Hopewell (United Kingdom). She was on a voyage from Brest, Finistère, France to St. Ubes, Spain
San Antonio	Spain	The ship was driven ashore near "Angolines". She was on a voyage from Bordeaux, Gironde, France, to Bilbao.
Virginie	United Kingdom of the Netherlands	The ship was driven ashore and damaged on Texel, North Holland. She was on a voyage from Amsterdam, North Holland, to Livorno and Genoa, Grand Duchy of Tuscany. Virginie was later refloated.

== 21 December ==
List of shipwrecks: 21 December 1821
Ship	State	Description
Aid	United Kingdom	The ship was severely damaged at Ilfracombe, Devon.
Ajax	United Kingdom	The ship was driven ashore at Littlehampton, Sussex. She was on a voyage from Portsmouth, Hampshire, to Shoreham-by-Sea, Sussex.
Ann, Elizabeth & Thomas	United Kingdom	The ship was wrecked at Ilfracombe.
Ariel	United Kingdom	The ship was damaged at Milford Haven, Pembrokeshire, when a vessel drove in to her. She was on a voyage from Glasgow, Renfrewshire, to Savannah, Georgia, United States.
Aurora	United Kingdom	The full-rigged ship was damaged at Milford Haven when a vessel drove in to her. She was on a voyage from Bristol, Gloucestershire, to Bilbao, Spain.
Berwick	United Kingdom	The ship was severely damaged at Ilfracombe.
Bideford	United Kingdom	The brig was driven ashore and damaged at Padstow, Cornwall. She was on a voyage from Saint John, New Brunswick, British North America, to Plymouth, Devon.
Bideford	United Kingdom	The ship was severely damaged at Ilfracombe.
Eliza	United Kingdom	The ship was severely damaged at Ilfracombe.
Esperance	France	The brig was wrecked near Havre de Grâce, Seine-Inférieure.
General Greenfield	United Kingdom	The ship was driven ashore at Scarborough, Yorkshire. Her crew were rescued. She was on a voyage from South Shields, County Durham, to London.
Hebe	United Kingdom	The brig was driven ashore on the Dunraven Cliffs, Glamorgan, with the loss of all eleven people on board. She was on a voyage from Waterford to Bristol, Gloucestershire.
Helen	United Kingdom	The ship was wrecked in the Atlantic Ocean with the loss of five lives. Four survivors were rescued on 25 December by Olinda (France). She was on a voyage from Newfoundland to Liverpool, Lancashire.
Hirondelle	France	The ship was wrecked at "Pedernayra". She was on a voyage from St. Ubes, Portugal to Havre de Grâce, Seine-Inférieure.
Hope	United Kingdom	The ship was severely damaged at Ilfracombe.
Lively	United Kingdom	The ship was wrecked at the mouth of the River Shannon. Her crew were rescued. She was on a voyage from Liverpool to New York, United States.
Mansfield	United Kingdom	The ship was driven ashore at Neyland.
Navigateur	France	The ship was wrecked near Havre de Grâce with some loss of life. She was on a voyage from London, United Kingdom, to Caen, Calvados.
Neptune	United Kingdom	The ship was severely damaged at Ilfracombe.
Oakwon	United Kingdom	The ship was severely damaged at Ilfracombe.
Queen Caroline	United Kingdom	The ship was severely damaged at Ilfracombe. She was on a voyage from Waterford to London.
Rambler	United Kingdom	The ship was severely damaged at Ilfracombe.
Sandwich	United Kingdom	The Post Office packet ship was run into by Sisters (United Kingdom) and subsequently drove ashore at Milford Haven.
Sisters	United Kingdom	The ship was driven ashore at Neyland, Pembrokeshire. She was on a voyage from the South Seas to London. Sisters was later refloated.
Spring	United Kingdom	The ship was severely damaged at Ilfracombe. Her hull was holed by and anchor. She was on a voyage from the South Seas to London.
Towidge	United Kingdom	The ship was severely damaged at Ilfracombe.
Wellington	United Kingdom	The ship was dismasted at Milford Haven.
Willem	Netherlands	The ship was driven ashore and wrecked at Ilfracombe. She was on a voyage from Rio de Janeiro, Brazil to Antwerp.

== 22 December ==
List of shipwrecks: 22 December 1821
Ship	State	Description
Allies	United Kingdom	The ship was lost off the Farne Islands, Northumberland. She was on a voyage from Sunderland, County Durham, to Aberdeen.
Autumn	United Kingdom	The ship was driven ashore and wrecked near Holyhead, Anglesey. Her crew were rescued. She was on a voyage from Trieste to Liverpool, Lancashire.
Caroline	United Kingdom	The transport ship ran aground at Portsmouth, Hampshire. She was on a voyage from Portsmouth to Woolwich, Kent.
Friendship	United Kingdom	The brig ran aground on the Cutler Sand. in the North Sea off the coast of Essex and foundered. Her crew were rescued. She was on a voyage from South Shields, County Durham, to London. Friendship was later refloated and taken in to Ayr.
Jamaica	United Kingdom	The ship was driven ashore and wrecked in Carnarvon Bay. Her crew were rescued. She was on a voyage from St. Andrews, New Brunswick, British North America, to Liverpool.
Methven Castle	United Kingdom	The ship ran aground on the Platters, in the North Sea off the coast of Essex and was abandoned by her crew. She was on a voyage from Perth to London.
Palemon	United Kingdom	The ship was wrecked in Bigbury Bay. She was on a voyage from London to St. Thomas, Virgin Islands.

== 23 December ==
List of shipwrecks: 23 December 1821
Ship	State	Description
American	France	The ship was wrecked at Arcachon, Basses-Pyrénées with the loss of all hands.
Concord	United Kingdom	The brig was wrecked at Placentia, Newfoundland, British North America.
East Indian	United Kingdom	The East Indiaman was wrecked on the Kettle-bottom Sand, in the North Sea off Great Yarmouth, Norfolk. A fishing vessel rescued her 20 crew. She was on a voyage from Hull to London, and Bengal.
General Lincoln	United States	The ship was driven ashore and wrecked at Genoa, Grand Duchy of Tuscany. She was on a voyage from Boston, Massachusetts, to Genoa.
Haabet	Norway	The ship was wrecked on the Norwegian coast.
Juliana	United Kingdom	The East Indiaman was wrecked on the Kentish Knock, in the North Sea off Margate, Kent, with the loss of all but two of her 37 crew. She was on a voyage from Batavia, Netherlands East Indies, to London via Calcutta, India.
Maria Anna	United Kingdom	The ship was in collision with Carlin (United Kingdom) in the North Sea off Hartlepool, County Durham, and sank. Her crew were rescued.
Pallas	United Kingdom	The ship was abandoned in the Atlantic Ocean. Her crew were rescued by George (United Kingdom). Pallas was on a voyage from Saint John, New Brunswick, British North America, to Aberdeen. She was towed in to Wexford on 10 February 1822.
Portia	France	The ship was wrecked at Arcachon with the loss of all hands.
Sophie	Norway	The ship was wrecked on the Norwegian coast. She was on a voyage from Copenhagen, Denmark, to Trondheim.
Sunderland	United Kingdom	The ship was driven ashore near Great Yarmouth. Her crew were rescued. She was on a voyage from Sunderland, County Durham, to Topsham, Devon.
Two Brothers	Sweden	The ship was driven ashore and wrecked at Genoa. She was on a voyage from Lisbon, Portugal, to Genoa.
Ulysses	United Kingdom	The ship sank at Bridlington, Yorkshire.
Vennerne	Norway	The ship was wrecked on the Norwegian coast.

== 24 December ==
List of shipwrecks: 24 December 1821
Ship	State	Description
Ales	Russia	The brig ran aground on the Casquets, Channel Isles and broke in two with the loss of two of her crew. The stern section subsequently came ashore on the south coast of the Isle of Wight, United Kingdom of Great Britain and Ireland. Thirteen crew there survived. Ales was on a voyage from London, United Kingdom, to St. Ubes, Portugal.
Amity	France	The ship was wrecked off Châtelaillon-Plage, Seine-Inférieure. She was on a voyage from Havana, Cuba, to. Bordeaux, Gironde.
Daphne	United Kingdom	The ship was abandoned in the North Sea. Her crew were rescued by Two Brothers (United Kingdom). She was on a voyage from Newcastle upon Tyne, Northumberland, to Hamburg.
Frances	France	The ship was wrecked at Marseille, Bouches-du-Rhone. She was on a voyage from Campeche, Mexico, to Marseille.
Frederick	United Kingdom	The ship was driven ashore and damaged at Lisbon. She was on a voyage from Lisbon to Liverpool.
Minerva	United Kingdom	The ship departed from Marazion, Cornwall, for Seville, Spain. No further trace, presumed foundered with the loss of all hands.
Three Brothers	United Kingdom	The schooner was driven ashore and damaged at Whitby, Yorkshire.

== 25 December ==
List of shipwrecks: 25 December 1821
Ship	State	Description
Abeona	United Kingdom	The ship was abandoned in the North Sea. Her crew were rescued by Rowena (United Kingdom). She was on a voyage from Great Yarmouth, Norfolk, to Naples, Kingdom of the Two Sicilies.
Ann	United Kingdom	The ship was wrecked near Cádiz, Spain. She was on a voyage from Faro, Portugal, to London.
Aurora	(United Kingdom of Great Britain and Ireland) Gibraltar	The schooner was driven ashore between Fort St. Philip and Gibraltar.
Beaver	United Kingdom	The sloop was wrecked on the Black Rock, off Troon, Ayrshire, with the loss of all three crew.
Belle	United Kingdom	The ship was driven ashore and wrecked at San Pier d'Arena, Grand Duchy of Tuscany with the loss of three of her crew. She was on a voyage from Liverpool, Lancashire, to Genoa and Livorno, Grand Duchy of Tuscany.
Brunswick	United Kingdom	The brig was severely damaged in a gale at Tarragona, Spain, where she was wrecked between 27 and 30 December.
Caroline	United Kingdom	The ship was destroyed by fire at Genoa.
Encounter	(United Kingdom of Great Britain and Ireland) Gibraltar	The hulk was driven ashore at Gibraltar.
Frances	United Kingdom	The ship was wrecked at Marseille, Bouches-du-Rhône, France.
François et Clairce	France	The two-masted schooner was driven ashore between Fort St. Philip's and Gibraltar.
Frederick	United Kingdom	The ship was wrecked at Lisbon, Portugal.
General Lincoln	United States	The schooner was wrecked at Genoa with the loss of two of her crew.
Gertrude	United Kingdom	The brig was wrecked at Tarragona. Her crew were rescued.
Guerriere	(United Kingdom of Great Britain and Ireland) Gibraltar	The pollacca brig was driven ashore between Fort St. Philip's and Gibraltar.
Harmony	United Kingdom	The brig was wrecked at Tarragona. Her crew were rescued.
Helen	United Kingdom	The ship was severely damaged at Genoa.
Jane Elizabeth	Sweden	The brig was wrecked at Tarragona. Her crew were rescued.
Jessie	United Kingdom	The schooner was severely damaged in a gale at Tarragona, where she was wrecked between 27 and 30 December.
John	United Kingdom	The ship was severely damaged in a gale at Genoa.
Kennedy	United Kingdom	The sloop was driven ashore and wrecked at Sunderland, County Durham.
Laura	United Kingdom	The ship was driven ashore at Gibraltar. She was later refloated.
Magnet	United Kingdom	The three-masted schooner was lost in a typhoon off Manila Her crew were rescued. She was on a voyage from the United Kingdom to Van Diemen's Land.
Manning	United Kingdom	The ship was severely damaged at Genoa.
Maria Carolina	Netherlands	The ship was wrecked near Toulon, Var, France. She was on a voyage from Livorno to Amsterdam, North Holland.
Maria da Sousa	Portugal	The ship was driven ashore at Gibraltar.
Mary	United Kingdom	The ship was wrecked at Fraserburgh, Aberdeenshire, with the loss of all hands. Several people going to her rescue were also drowned.
Minstrel	United Kingdom	The snow was wrecked at Tarragona. Her crew were rescued.
Montagu	United Kingdom	The ship was severely damaged at Genoa.
Redlegheden	flag unknown	The ship was wrecked at Genoa.
Retrieve	United Kingdom	The snow was severely damaged in a gale at Tarragona.
Sarah	United Kingdom	The brig was wrecked near Tarragona. Her crew were rescued.
St. Anthony	(United Kingdom of Great Britain and Ireland) Gibraltar	The polacca was driven ashore between Fort St. Philip's and Gibraltar.
St. Roche	France	The ship was driven ashore at Gibraltar. She was later refloated.
Success	United Kingdom	The schooner was driven ashore between Fort St. Philip's and Gibraltar. She was later refloated.
Susan	United States	The brig was driven ashore between Fort St. Philip's and Gibraltar.
Susan	(United Kingdom of Great Britain and Ireland) British North America	The schooner was driven ashore and wrecked between Fort St. Philip's and Gibraltar. She was later refloated.
Swan	United States	The schooner was wrecked at Genoa.
Tarah	United Kingdom	The brig was driven ashore and severely damaged at Tarragona, where she was wrecked between 27 and 30 December.
Two Brothers	Sweden	The ship was wrecked at Genoa.
Two Friends	United Kingdom	The polacca was driven ashore between Fort St. Philip's and Gibraltar.

== 26 December ==
List of shipwrecks: 26 December 1821
Ship	State	Description
Erin	United Kingdom	The ship was wrecked at Killough, County Antrim. She was on a voyage from Glasgow, Renfrewshire, to Newry, County Antrim.
Industry	United Kingdom	The ship was wrecked on the north coast of the Isle of Man. Her crew were rescued. She was on a voyage from Liverpool to Dublin.

== 27 December ==
List of shipwrecks: 27 December 1821
Ship	State	Description
Christina Titia	France	The ship was lost near La Rochelle, Charente-Maritime. She was on a voyage from Bordeaux, Gironde, to Amsterdam, North Holland, Netherlands.
Guadeloupe	France	The ship was driven ashore in Cádiz Bay.
Mars	United Kingdom	The ship was driven ashore and wrecked near Fowey, Cornwall.
Osbaldeston	United Kingdom	The ship struck a sunken rock off Barra, Outer Hebrides and was consequently beached there. She was on a voyage from Riga, Russia, to Liverpool, Lancashire.
Pallas	United Kingdom	The ship was driven ashore and wrecked near Fowey.

== 28 December ==
List of shipwrecks: 28 December 1821
Ship	State	Description
Alexander	France	The ship was driven ashore and wrecked at Gachère, Vendée. All on board were rescued.
Aurora	Grand Duchy of Tuscany	The ship was driven ashore at Gibraltar. She was on a voyage from Genoa to St. Thomas, Virgin Islands.
Betsey and Mary Ann	United Kingdom	The ship was driven ashore at Wexford. Her crew were rescued. She was on a voyage from Cork to Glasgow, Renfrewshire.
Camden Packet	United Kingdom	The ship ran aground and was severely damaged at Dale, Pembrokeshire.
Catharine	United Kingdom	The ship was driven ashore at Gibraltar.
City of Cork	United Kingdom	The steamship sank at Cork with the loss of one life.
City of Cork	United Kingdom	The sailing ship was driven ashore at Cork. She was on a voyage from Cork to Bristol, Gloucestershire.
Collier	United Kingdom	The ship was wrecked at Castletown, Isle of Man. Her crew were rescued.
Concord	United Kingdom	The ship was driven ashore and wrecked 5 nautical miles (9.3 km) from Padstow, Cornwall, with the loss of four of the seven people on board. She was on a voyage from Waterford to Cork.
Concord	United Kingdom	The ship was lost at Placentia, Newfoundland, British North America. She was on a voyage from Newfoundland to Greenock, Renfrewshire.
Draper	United Kingdom	The ship was lost in the Caicos Islands. All on board were rescued. She was on a voyage from Bermuda to Jamaica.
Ellen	United Kingdom	The ship was driven ashore and wrecked at Kingstown, County Dublin. Her crew were rescued. She was on a voyage from Liverpool, Lancashire, to Dublin.
Eliza	United Kingdom	The ship was driven ashore in Tor Bay. Her crew were rescued.
Elizabeth	United Kingdom	The ship was driven ashore 50 nautical miles (93 km) north of Lisbon, Portugal. She was on a voyage from Pará, Brazil to Liverpool.
Fanny	United Kingdom	The brig was driven ashore and wrecked at Blakeney, Norfolk.
Flor do Porto	Portugal	The ship was driven ashore at Vigo, Spain. She was on a voyage from Rio de Janeiro, Brazil, to Porto.
Fly	United Kingdom	The ship foundered in the North Sea off Alnmouth, Northumberland, with the loss of all hands.
Fort William	United Kingdom	The ship was driven ashore in the River Thames at Gravesend, Kent. She was on a voyage from Batavia, Netherlands East Indies, to London. Fort William was later refloated.
Gambier	United Kingdom	The ship was scuttled at St Michael's Mount, Cornwall, and broke her back.
Grimsby Packet	United Kingdom	The ship was driven against the pier at Kingston upon Hull, Yorkshire, with the loss of the captain of Albion (United Kingdom), the crew of which she had previously rescued.
Hannah	United Kingdom	The ship was driven ashore at Dún Laoghaire, County Dublin. She was on a voyage from New York, United States, to Liverpool. Hannah was later refloated and taken in to Sandy Cove Creek.
Hyder Ally	United Kingdom	The hulk was driven ashore and wrecked at Cork.
Industry	United Kingdom	The ship was driven ashore at Great Yarmouth, Norfolk. She was on a voyage from Newcastle upon Tyne, Northumberland, to Jersey, Channel Islands.
Josina	United Kingdom	The ship was driven ashore and wrecked at Gibraltar.
Les Trois Amis	France	The chasse-marée was driven ashore in Restronguet Creek. Her crew were rescued.
Liberty	United Kingdom	The ship was driven ashore at Portland, Dorset. She was later refloated.
Manlius	France	The ship was driven ashore and wrecked on St. Nicholas Island, Devon, United Kingdom. Her crew were rescued. She was on a voyage from Havre de Grâce, Seine-Inférieure to Rio de Janeiro, Brazil.
Maria	United Kingdom	The ship was driven ashore in Southampton Water.
Maria da Sousa	United Kingdom	The ship was driven ashore at Gibraltar.
Mars	United Kingdom	The ship was driven ashore and wrecked at Par, Cornwall.
Mary	United Kingdom	The ship capsized at Waterford.
Mary Ann	United Kingdom	The ship was driven ashore and wrecked at Corton, Suffolk. She was on a voyage from Sunderland, County Durham, to London.
Mary Ann	United Kingdom	The ship was driven ashore and severely damaged at Cork. She was later refloated.
Ospe	Grand Duchy of Tuscany	The ship was driven ashore at Gibraltar.
Pallas	United Kingdom	The ship was driven ashore and wrecked at Par.
Phœnix	United Kingdom	The ship struck the pier and sank at Southampton, Hampshire. She was on a voyage from Saint-Malo, Ille-et-Vilaine, France to Southampton.
Renown	United Kingdom	The ship was driven ashore at Vigo. She was on a voyage from London to Porto.
Roffey	United Kingdom	The brig was wrecked at Bretignolles-sur-Mer, Vendée, France. She was on a voyage from London to the Charente.
HMRC Skylark	Board of Customs	The cutter ran aground and was damaged at Dale.
Venus	United Kingdom	The ship was driven ashore at Southampton.
Walter	United States	The ship was driven ashore at Gibraltar.

== 29 December ==
List of shipwrecks: 29 December 1821
Ship	State	Description
Adventurer	France	The ship was driven ashore in the River Crac. She was on a voyage from Marseille, Bouches-du-Rhône to Nantes, Loire-Inférieure.
Allies	United Kingdom	The ship struck a rock and was wrecked off the Farne Islands, Northumberland. Her crew survived. She was on a voyage from Sunderland, County Durham, to Aberdeen.
Atlas	United Kingdom	The ship was driven ashore at Bideford, Devon. She was on a voyage from Havana, Cuba, to Rotterdam, South Holland, Netherlands. Atlas was refloated in mid-February 1822 and taken in to Bideford.
Betsey & Mary-ann	United Kingdom	The ship was driven ashore in South Bay, County Wexford. Her crew were rescued. She was on a voyage from Cork to Glasgow, Renfrewshire.
Catharine	United Kingdom	The ship was driven ashore at Gibraltar.
Corsair	United Kingdom	The ship was driven ashore in Bootle Bay. She was on a voyage from Liverpool, Lancashire, to Charleston, South Carolina, United States. Corsair was later refloated and put back to Liverpool.
Dido	United Kingdom	The ship was driven ashore by ice and wrecked in the Delaware River, near Fort Gaines, Maryland, United States. She was later refloated and taken in to Marcus Hook, Pennsylvania.
Herculena	United Kingdom	The ship was driven ashore and wrecked at A Coruña, Spain.
Jason	United Kingdom	The ship was wrecked at Ouessant, Finistère, France with the loss of all hands. She was on a voyage from London to Odesa.
Josina	United Kingdom	The ship was driven ashore and wrecked at Gibraltar.
Mary-Ann	United Kingdom	The ship was driven ashore and wrecked at Corton, Suffolk. She was on a voyage from Sunderland to London.
Ospe	Kingdom of Sardinia	The ship was driven ashore and wrecked at Gibraltar.
Redligheten	Unknown	The ship was driven ashore and wrecked near Genoa, Grand Duchy of Tuscany. She was on a voyage from Lisbon, Portugal, to Genoa.
Walter	United States	The ship was driven ashore and wreckeed at Gibraltar.

== 30 December ==
List of shipwrecks: 30 December 1821
Ship	State	Description
Flora	United Kingdom	The ship was in collision with John & Ann (United Kingdom) and was abandoned in the North Sea off Orfordness, Suffolk. Her crew were rescued by John &Ann. Flora was on a voyage from Newcastle upon Tyne, Northumberland, to Sandwich, Kent.
John and Mary	United Kingdom	The ship was wrecked at Hook of Holland, South Holland, Netherlands. She was on a voyage from Rotterdam, South Holland, to Leith, Lothian.
Lys	France	The ship was driven ashore at Peniche, Portugal. She was on a voyage from Marseille, Bouches-du-Rhône to Nantes, Loire-Inférieure.
Rapporteur	France	The ship was driven ashore and wrecked at Le Tréport, Seine-Inférieure. Her crew were rescued. She was on a voyage from Marseille to Rouen, Seine-Inférieure.

== 31 December ==
List of shipwrecks: 31 December 1821
Ship	State	Description
Fanny	United Kingdom	The brig was driven ashore and wrecked at Blakeney, Norfolk.
Zeelust	Netherlands	The ship was wrecked at Ostend. Her crew were rescued. She was on a voyage from London, United Kingdom, to Ostend.

== Unknown date ==
List of shipwrecks: Unknown date in December 1821
Ship	State	Description
Alert	United Kingdom	The ship foundered in the North Sea. Her crew were rescued by Britannia (United Kingdom).
Alert	United Kingdom	The ship was driven ashore and wrecked on the coast of Friesland, Netherlands.
Alexander	France	The ship was driven ashore between L'Aiguillon-sur-Mer, Vendée and "Tromantine" between 24 and 28 December. All on board were rescued. She was on a voyage from Bordeaux, Gironde, to South America.
Ann	United Kingdom	The ship was wrecked on the Isle of Man. She was on a voyage from Waterford to Glasgow, Renfrewshire.
Beaver	United Kingdom	The sloop foundered in the Irish Sea north of Ayr in late December with the loss of all hands. She was on a voyage from Ayr to the Isle of Man.
Bella Allianze	Spain	The ship was wrecked at Vigo before 31 December.
Carl Henry	Russia	The ship was driven ashore at Arkhangelsk before 9 December. She was on a voyage from Arkhangelsk to Marseille, Bouches-du-Rhône, France.
Cendrillon	France	The ship was driven ashore on Texel, North Holland, Netherlands. She was on a voyage from Amsterdam, North Holland, to Havre de Grâce, Seine-Inférieure.
Colon	France	The ship was driven ashore on the coast of "Richard". She was on a voyage from Bordeaux, Gironde, to Guadeloupe. She was later refloated.
Concordia	United Kingdom	The ship was driven ashore on Heligoland. She was on a voyage from Brevig, Barra, Outer Hebrides to Windau, Prussia.
Concordia	United Kingdom	The ship was lost at Strömstadt, Sweden with the loss of all hands.
Confiance	France	The ship was driven ashore and wrecked between L'Aiguillon-sur-Mer and "Tromatine" between 24 and 28 December with the loss of four of her crew. She was on a voyage from Guadeloupe to Bordeaux.
Earl of Dalhousie	United Kingdom	The ship foundered off the Copeland Islands, County Down, with the loss of five of her crew. She was on a voyage from Arkhangelsk, Russia, to Dublin.
Elizabeth	United Kingdom	The ship was driven ashore near Peniche, Portugal. She was on a voyage from Pará, Brazil to Liverpool.
Ellen	United Kingdom	The ship was lost at Kingstown, County Dublin. Her crew were rescued.
Ellen	United Kingdom	The ship foundered in the Grand Banks of Newfoundland with the loss of five of her nine crew. The survivors were rescued on 26 December by a French ship.
Eringene	France	The ship was lost near Varberg, Sweden. Her crew were rescued. She was on a voyage from Bordeaux, Gironde, to Danzig.
Hannah	United Kingdom	The ship ran aground at Carnal's Point, Anglesey. Her crew were rescued. She was on a voyage from Dublin to Liverpool, Lancashire.
Hannah	United States	The ship was driven ashore near Kingstown. She was on a voyage from New York to Liverpool.
Hebe	United Kingdom	The ship foundered in the Bristol Channel off Southerndown, Glamorgan, between 19 and 27 December. She was on a voyage from Waterford to Bristol, Gloucestershire
Hebe	France	The ship was driven ashore at La Teste-de-Buch, Gironde before 24 December. She was on a voyage from Saint Petersburg, Russia, to Bordeaux, Gironde.
Helen	United Kingdom	The ship was driven ashore and wrecked at Kingstown, County Dublin. She was on a voyage from Liverpool to Dublin.
Highflyer	United Kingdom	The ship was driven ashore at Ramsey, Isle of Man. She was on a voyage from Liverpool to Dublin.
Hoffnung	Netherlands	The ship was driven ashore on Heligoland. She was on a voyage from Groningen to London, United Kingdom.
Hope	United Kingdom	The ship departed from Plymouth, Devon, for Terceira, Spain. No further trace, presumed foundered with the loss of all hands.
Industry	United Kingdom	The ship foundered in the North Sea off Hook of Holland, South Holland, Netherlands. Her crew were rescued. She was on a voyage from Newcastle upon Tyne, Northumberland, to Rotterdam, South Holland.
James and Ann	United Kingdom	The ship was wrecked on Götaland, Sweden. She was on a voyage from Saint Petersburg to London.
James & Ellen	(United Kingdom of Great Britain and Ireland) Jersey	The ship was driven ashore on Scharhörn. She was on a voyage from Jersey to Hamburg. James & Ellen was later refloated.
Jane & Ann	United Kingdom	The ship was driven ashore and wrecked in Swansea Bay. She was on a voyage from a Cornish port to Llanelli, Glamorgan.
Jonge Jacob	Prussia	The ship foundered in the Baltic Sea off Memel with the loss of all hands before 8 December. She was on a voyage from Königsberg to London.
Leopard	United Kingdom	The ship was wrecked on Seal Island, Nova Scotia in mid-December. Her crew were rescued. She was on a voyage from the West Indies to Saint John, New Brunswick.
London	United Kingdom	The ship was driven ashore crewless in Salcombe Bay.
Mally	France	The ship was driven ashore at "Lomarisquere", Brittany. Her crew were rescued. She was on a voyage from Île Bourbon to Bordeaux, Gironde.
Maria	United Kingdom	The ship was wrecked near Digby, Nova Scotia, British North America, in late December. Her crew were rescued. She was on a voyage from Jamaica to Saint John, New Brunswick, British North America.
Mangloire	France	The ship was driven ashore and wrecked between L'Aiguillon-sur-Mer and "Tromatine" between 24 and 28 December. Her crew were rescued. She was on a voyage from Guadeloupe to Bordeaux, Gironde.
Mathilda	Denmark	The ship was driven ashore and wrecked near Marstrand, Sweden. She was on a voyage from Copenhagen to St Croix and St. Thomas, Virgin Islands.
Molly	France	The ship was lost off Locmariaquer, Morbihan. Her crew were rescued. She was on a voyage from Belle Île, Finistère to Bordeaux.
Mount Stone	United Kingdom	The ship was driven ashore on the Sandwich Flats, Kent. She was on a voyage from Lisbon, Portugal, to London. Mount Stone was refloated on 19 December and taken in to Ramsgate, Kent.
Petronella	Norway	The ship was lost near Dragør, Denmark. She was on a voyage from Bergen to Karlshamn, Sweden.
Prospect	United Kingdom	The ship was lost near Strömstadt with the loss of all hands. She was on a voyage from Kiel, Prussia, to Hull.
Recovery	United Kingdom	The ship was wrecked at Ballyquinton Point, County Down. Her crew were rescued. She was on a voyage from Liverpool to Limerick.
Richard	United Kingdom	The ship was driven ashore between Skegness and Wainfleet, Lincolnshire. She was on a voyage from Hull, Yorkshire, to King's Lynn, Norfolk. Richard was later refloated and returned to Hull for repairs.
Riffley	United Kingdom	The ship was driven ashore and wrecked between L'Aiguillon-sur-Mer and "Tromantine" between 24 and 28 December. Her crew were rescued. She was on a voyage from London to the Charente.
Sacramento	United Kingdom	The ship was driven into Providence (United Kingdom at St. Ubes, Portugal before 27 December and was consequently beached.
Sally	United Kingdom	The ship was lost in the Dardanelles. She was om a voyage from Odesa to Constantinople, Ottoman Empire.
Speculation	United Kingdom	The ship was wrecked in the Courantyne River, Surinam.
Stephen Knight	United Kingdom	The ship was damaged at St. Ubes when Johanna (United Kingdom) and was consequently beached.
Sophia	United States	The schooner was wrecked 10 nautical miles (19 km) north of the Currituck Inlet with the loss of all but one of her crew. She was on a voyage from Philadelphia, Pennsylvania, to Norfolk, Virginia, and Baltimore, Maryland.
Susannah	United Kingdom	The ship foundered off the Isle of Islay before 24 December.
Union	United Kingdom	The ship was driven ashore near Dragør, Denmark before 11 December. She was on a voyage from Riga, Russia, to London. Union was later refloated.
Veranderung	Hamburg	The ship was wrecked near "Waarde", Jutland. She was on a voyage from Bahia, Brazil to Hamburg.
Volante	United States	The ship was lost near Newburyport, Massachusetts. Her crew were rescued.
Vrow Elizabeth	United Kingdom	The ship was driven ashore on Texel.
Vrow Maria	Netherlands	The ship was lost near "Yylt". She was on a voyage from Amsterdam to Husum, Duchy of Schleswig.
Wilhelmina Magdalena	Russia	The ship was driven ashore near Dagerort. She was on a voyage from London to Hapsal.
William	United Kingdom	The ship was driven ashore at Kilrush, County Clare, before 5 December.
William & Ann	United Kingdom	The ship was driven ashore between Skegness and Wainfleet. She was on a voyage from Hull to Spalding, Lincolnshire. William & Ann was later refloated and returned from Hull for repairs.
