= List of shipwrecks in February 1877 =

The list of shipwrecks in February 1877 includes ships sunk, foundered, grounded, or otherwise lost during February 1877.

== 1 February ==
List of shipwrecks: 1 February 1877
Ship	State	Description
Amoy	United Kingdom	The barque ran aground on the Ridge Bank, off Cloghy, County Down and sank. All twelve people on board were rescued by the tug Flying Tempest (United Kingdom. Amoy was on a voyage from Pernambuco, Brazil to Dundee, Forfarshire.
Doctor	United Kingdom	The ship was driven ashore in the Strangford Lough. She was on a voyage from Portaferry, County Down to Cardiff, Glamorgan.
Galveston	Germany	The barque was driven ashore on Terschelling, Friesland, Netherlands. Her crew were rescued. She was on a voyage from Bremen to New York, United States.
Incorrigible	United Kingdom	The fishing smack was run into by the steamship Urbino (United Kingdom) and sank in the North Sea off Flamborough Head, Yorkshire. Her five crew were rescued by Urbino.
John H. Kimball	United Kingdom	The ship was driven ashore and wrecked on Terschelling. Her crew were rescued. She was on a voyage from the Nieuwe Diep to Cardiff, Glamorgan.
Mona	United Kingdom	The schooner was driven ashore in the Larne Lough. She was on a voyage from Silloth, Cumberland to Londonderry.
Moselle	France	The steamship ran aground on the Nore.
Romano	France	The brig was abandoned in the Atlantic Ocean 120 nautical miles (220 km) off Lisbon, Portugal. Her crew were rescued by Blanche Currey (United Kingdom). Romano was on a voyage from Swansea, Glamorgan to Tarragona, Spain.
William	Canada	The barque was driven ashore at Deal, Kent, United Kingdom. She was refloated and towed in to Ramsgate, Kent.

== 2 February ==
List of shipwrecks: 2 February 1877
Ship	State	Description
Adelaide H. Moir	United Kingdom	The schooner ran aground and sank in the River Loukos at Larache, Morocco.
Barbara Young	United Kingdom	The ship was driven ashore and wrecked at Lindisfarne, Northumberland. Her crew were rescued.
Carolina	Sweden	The derelict schooner was towed in to Cuxhaven, Germany by the steamship Hansa (Germany).
Countess of Galloway	United Kingdom	The paddle steamer ran aground in the River Bladnoch. She was on a voyage from Wigtown to Liverpool, Lancashire.
Inveraray Castle	United Kingdom	The paddle steamer struck a sunken rock at Tarbert, Argyllshire and was beached. She was on a voyage from Glasgow, Renfrewshire to Tarbert.
Zephyr	United Kingdom	The steamship ran aground at Waterford. She was on a voyage from Waterford to Liverpool.

== 3 February ==
List of shipwrecks: 3 February 1877
Ship	State	Description
Anna Maria	Netherlands	The brig ran aground at Canavieras, Brazil and was wrecked. She was on a voyage from Rio de Janeiro to Canavieras.
Artos	United Kingdom	The steamship ran aground on the Haisborough Sands, in the North Sea off the coast of Norfolk. She was on a voyage from Alexandria, Egypt to Hull, Yorkshire. She was refloated with assistance from the lifeboat Minnie Hume ( Royal National Lifeboat Institution) and the yawls Dart and Paragon (both United Kingdom) and resumed her voyage.
Catharina	Germany	The brig was driven ashore at Whitefarland Point, Renfrewshire, United Kingdom. She was on a voyage from Bahia, Brazil to Germany.
Joachim Gees	Germany	The barque was driven ashore at Skudesneshavn, Norway. Her crew were rescued. She was a total loss.
Kezia Harrison	United Kingdom	The schooner was abandoned in the North Sea. Her crew were rescued by the smack Superb (United Kingdom). Kezia Harrison was on a voyage from Berwick upon Tweed, Northumberland to Shoreham-by-Sea, Sussex. She was towed in to Hull, Yorkshire in a derelict condition.
Mary Ridley	United Kingdom	The barque was abandoned in the North Sea. Her eleven crew were rescued by the smack John Rogers (United Kingdom). Mary Ridley was on a voyage from South Shields, County Durham to Málaga, Spain. She was towed in to Grimsby, Lincolnshire in a derelict condition by the smacks Mercury and Terror (both United Kingdom).
Terrible	United Kingdom	The skiff was abandoned off Islay, Inner Hebrides. Her six crew were rescued by a steamship.
Woodvale	United Kingdom	The schooner was driven ashore at Belfast, County Antrim. She was refloated the next day.

== 4 February ==
List of shipwrecks: 4 February 1877
Ship	State	Description
Josefina	Sweden	The barque was destroyed by fire at Buenos Aires, Argentina.
Panmure	United Kingdom	The schooner put in to Berwick upon Tweed, Northumberland in a sinking condition.

== 5 February ==
List of shipwrecks: 5 February 1877
Ship	State	Description
Britannia	United Kingdom	The ship ran aground on the Longsand, in the Lynn Deeps. She was refloated on 9 February with assistance from the tug Spindrift (United Kingdom).
Carisbrooke	United Kingdom	The barque was driven ashore and wrecked on Schiermonnikoog, Friesland, Netherlands with the loss of a crew member. She was on a voyage from Livorno, Italy to Hamburg, Germany.
Carnholm	United Kingdom	The steamship ran aground in the Clyde. She was refloated with the assistance of tugs.
Danzig	Flag unknown	The steamship was driven ashore at "Hallands Wadero", Sweden. She was on a voyage from Leith, Lothian, United Kingdom to Copenhagen, Denmark.
Elizabeth Scott	United Kingdom	The ship ran aground on the Oxey Spit, off Lymington, Hampshire. She was on a voyage from Dundee, Forfarshire to Matanzas, Cuba.
Iona	United Kingdom	The ship was driven ashore at Ballyferris, County Down. She was on a voyage from Sligo to Penarth, Glamorgan. She was refloated and taken in to the Belfast Lough.
Penguin	United Kingdom	The barque ran aground on the Whitby Rock. She was on a voyage from Sunderland, County Durham to Trinidad. She was refloated with assistance from the tug Emu (United Kingdom) and taken in to Sandsend, Yorkshire in a leaky condition.
Saint Esprit	France	The sloop foundered in the English Channel off the mouth of the Dives.
Singapore	New South Wales	The steamship was wrecked in the Cumberland Islands, Queensland. All on board were rescued. She was on a voyage from Hong Kong to Brisbane, Queensland.
Speedy	United Kingdom	The tug was run into by the steamship Earl of Aberdeen (United Kingdom) and sank in the River Thames at Limehouse, Middlesex with the loss of three of her crew.

== 6 February ==
List of shipwrecks: 6 February 1877
Ship	State	Description
Bavaria	United Kingdom	The ship caught fire in the Atlantic Ocean and was abandoned. All on board took to the boats; they were rescued the next day by the barque Dorothy Thompson (United Kingdom). Bavaria was on a voyage from New Orleans, Louisiana, United States to Liverpool, Lancashire.
Elizabeth Scott	United Kingdom	The brig was driven ashore near Lymington, Hampshire. She was on a voyage from Dundee, Forfarshire to Matanzas, Cuba. She was refloated.
Ethel	United Kingdom	The steamship was wrecked on Black Rock, Lundy Island, Devon with the loss of nineteen of her twenty crew. She was on a voyage from Bilbao, Spain to Newport, Monmouthshire.
Harriet	United Kingdom	The schooner ran aground on the Maplin Sand, in the North Sea off the coast of Essex. She was on a voyage from South Shields, County Durham to London. She was refloated on 9 February with the assistance of two tugs and resumed her voyage.

== 7 February ==
List of shipwrecks: 7 February 1877
Ship	State	Description
Bozzo, and Joseph et Marie	Italy; France	The barque Bozzo collided with the smack Joseph et Marie in the English Channel 20 nautical miles (37 km) south west of Beachy Head, Sussex, United Kingdom. All three crew of Joseph et Marie got aboard Bozzo, which later sank. They were rescued by a French smack. All thirteen crew of Bozzo were rescued by the barque Ohla (Norway). Bozzo was on a voyage from London, United Kingdom to Baltimore, Maryland, United States.
Gitanna	United Kingdom	The schooner collided with the steamship John Byng (United Kingdom) and sank in the Bristol Channel off the Mumbles Lightship ( Trinity House) with the loss of five of her six crew. The survivor was rescued by John Byng. Gitanna was on a voyage from Louvain, Flemish Brabant, Belgium to Swansea, Glamorgan.
Monteyn	United Kingdom	The steamship ran aground at Wexford. She was on a voyage from Liverpool, Lancashire to Wexford. She was refloated the next day and taken in to Wexford.
Ullock	United Kingdom	The barque was driven ashore at Tacumshane, County Wexford. Her nineteen crew were rescued. She was on a voyage from Cardiff, Glamorgan to Anjer, Netherlands East Indies.

== 8 February ==
List of shipwrecks: 8 February 1877
Ship	State	Description
Admiral	United States	The ship was driven ashore and wrecked on the coast of Patagonia, Argentina. She was on a voyage from New York to San Francisco, California.
Imogene	United Kingdom	The ship was destroyed by fire at Pernambuco, Brazil.
Unnamed	Spain	The barque collided with Mairi Bhan (United Kingdom) and sank in the Atlantic Ocean with the loss of a crew member. Survivors were rescued by Mairi Bhan.

== 9 February ==
List of shipwrecks: 9 February 1877
Ship	State	Description
Elizabeth	United Kingdom	The steamship was driven ashore on Bornholm, Denmark. She was on a voyage from Pillau, Germany to Hull, Yorkshire. She was refloated and put in to Copenhagen, Denmark in a leaky condition.
Fox	United Kingdom	The sloop sprang a leak and sank 2 nautical miles (3.7 km) south of Cumbrae, Ayrshire. Her crew survived. She was on a voyage from Port Dundas, Renfrewshire to Carrickfergus County Antrim.
Johann Friedrich	Germany	The ship was wrecked at Petit Trou, Dominican Republic.

== 10 February ==
List of shipwrecks: 10 February 1877
Ship	State	Description
Frid	Norway	The brig was wrecked at Le Portel, Pas-de-Calais, France. Her six crew were rescued. She was on a voyage from Cádiz, Spain to Kristiansand.
Glenmore	United Kingdom	The schooner ran aground on the Shipwash Sand, in the North Sea off the coast of Suffolk. She was on a voyage from Rochester, Kent to South Shields, County Durham. She was refloated with the assistance of a tug and assisted in to Great Yarmouth, Norfolk .
Percy	Russia	The brig ran aground on The Brambles, in the Solent. She was on a voyage from Rouen, Seine-Inférieure, France to Cardiff, Glamorgan, United Kingdom.
Thetis	United Kingdom	The Thames barge was run into by the steamship Cobden (United Kingdom) and sank in the River Thames at Blackwall, Middlesex.

== 11 February ==
List of shipwrecks: 11 February 1877
Ship	State	Description
Charlemagne	United Kingdom	The brig ran aground on the Maplin Sand, in the North Sea off the coast of Essex. She was on a voyage from Sunderland, County Durham to London. She was refloated the next day and resumed her voyage.
Matilda	United Kingdom	The schooner was run into by the steamship California (United Kingdom and sank in the Firth of Clyde with the loss of four of her five crew. The survivor was rescued by California. Matilda was on a voyage from Irvine, Ayrshire to Belfast, County Antrim.

== 12 February ==
List of shipwrecks: 12 February 1877
Ship	State	Description
Queen	United Kingdom	The Humber Keel was run into by a lighter and sank at Hull, Yorkshire. She was subsequently refloated, repaired and returned to service.
Queen of Hearts	(Canada)	The ship was driven ashore at Slattery, Isle of Arran, United Kingdom. Her crew survived; one of them was rescued by the Isle of Arran Lifeboat. Queen of Hearts was on a voyage from the Clyde to the Hampton Roads, Virginia, United States. She was refloated on 28 February with assistance from the tug Flying Squall (United Kingdom) and towed in to Greenock, Renfrewshire.

== 13 February ==
List of shipwrecks: 13 February 1877
Ship	State	Description
Celina	France	The schooner foundered 6 nautical miles (11 km) north east of Strumble Head, Pembrokeshire, United Kingdom. Her crew survived.
Garthland	United Kingdom	The ship departed from Santander, Spain for Belfast, County Antrim. No further trace, posted missing.
Nora	United Kingdom	The steamship ran aground. She was on a voyage from London to Rotterdam, South Holland, Netherlands. She was refloated and completed her voyage.
Unnamed	Flag unknown	The ship was wrecked in Castello Bay, County Galway, United Kingdom.

== 14 February ==
List of shipwrecks: 14 February 1877
Ship	State	Description
Alfred and Florence	United Kingdom	The Thames barge was run down and sunk in the River Thames at Limehouse, Middlesex by the steamship Rainbow (United Kingdom).
Halcyon	New Zealand	The 24-ton steamship was anchored at Orepuki when a heavy swell arose. The master raised the anchor and attempted to take to the sea, but the port engine failed, and before the anchor could again be lowered she was dashed on rocks. Her crew were rescued.
Sunrise	United Kingdom	The schooner was run into by the steamship Eunice (United Kingdom) and sank in the River Tyne at South Shields, County Durham. Her crew were rescued by the tug Pilot (United Kingdom). Sunrise was on a voyage from London to the River Tyne.

== 15 February ==
List of shipwrecks: 15 February 1877
Ship	State	Description
Mairi Bhan, and an unnamed vessel	United Kingdom; Spain	A Spanish barque collided with Mairi Bhan and sank off the Isles of Scilly with the loss of a crew member. Survivors were rescued by Mairi Bhan. Mairi Bhan was on a voyage from Calcutta, India to London. She put in to the Isles of Scilly severely damaged at the bows.

== 16 February ==
List of shipwrecks: 16 February 1877
Ship	State	Description
Himalaya	United Kingdom	The ship was damaged by fire at Wellington, New Zealand.
John o'Gaunt	United Kingdom	The ship was wrecked at "Balag Samar", Spanish East Indies. Her crew were rescued. SHe was on a voyage from Liverpool, Lancashire to Manila, Spanish East Indies.
Naworth Castle	United Kingdom	The barque was wrecked on a reef in the Paracel Islands with the loss of two of her eleven crew. Survivors were rescued the next day by a junk. She was on a voyage from Shantou, China to Falmouth, Cornwall.
Ontario	United Kingdom	The steamship was driven ashore at Philadelphia, Pennsylvania, United States. She was on a voyage from Philadelphia to Liverpool, Lancashire. She was refloated on 19 February.
Wright	United Kingdom	The schooner departed from the River Tyne for Dunkirk, Nord, France. No further trace, posted missing.

== 17 February ==
List of shipwrecks: 17 February 1877
Ship	State	Description
Alice Ritson	United Kingdom	The ship ran aground in the River Mersey. She was on a voyage from Singapore, Straits Settlements to Liverpool, Lancashire. She was refloated with assistance and taken in to Liverpool.
Astro de Mer	France	The fishing smack collided with the barque Clyde (New South Wales) and sank in the English Channel 20 nautical miles (37 km) south of Newhaven, Sussex, United Kingdom. Her three crew were rescued by Clyde.
Delos	United Kingdom	The steamship ran aground at Tenedos, Ottoman Empire. She was on a voyage from Hull, Yorkshire to Odesa, Russia. She was refloated with assistance on 19 February.
Ellore	Italy	The ship was wrecked at "Karadash". Her crew were rescued.
Gateshead	United Kingdom	The ship ran aground on the Megstone, in the Farne Islands, Northumberland. She was on a voyage from Susa, Persia to the River Tyne. She was refloated and towed in to the River Tyne.
Ireshope	United Kingdom	The full-rigged ship caught fire at Anjer, Netherlands East Indies. She was on a voyage from Newcastle upon Tyne, Northumberland to Singapore, Straits Settlements. She was towed to Banlau, Netherlands East Indies and beached.
Kitty	Austria-Hungary	The barque was wrecked at "Karadash". Her crew were rescued.
Lutzitania	Portugal	The barque was driven ashore at Porto. She was on a voyage from Porto to Brazil.
Mary	United Kingdom	The schooner foundered 15 nautical miles (28 km) off Carlingford, County Louth. She was on a voyage from Carrickfergus, County Antrim to Dundalk, County Louth.
Membray	United Kingdom	The fishing lugger capsized and sank at Plymouth, Devon with the loss of one of her four crew.

== 18 February ==
List of shipwrecks: 18 February 1877
Ship	State	Description
Fieres	Malta	The barque was run into by the steamship Campanil (United Kingdom) and sank off Penarth, Glamorgan, United Kingdom; Her crew were rescued by Campanil. Fieres was on a voyage from Cardiff, Glamorgan to Malta.
John	United Kingdom	The schooner was wrecked in Red Wharf Bay with the loss of all hands. She was on a voyage from Beaumaris, Anglesey to Dublin.
Thetis	United Kingdom	The schooner was driven ashore and wrecked at Acquabella, Sardinia, Italy. Her crew survived. She was on a voyage from Barcelona, Spain to Palermo, Sicily, Italy.
Four unnamed vessels	Flags unknown	The ships were driven ashore and wrecked in Chesapeake Bay with the loss of 27 lives.

== 19 February ==
List of shipwrecks: 19 February 1877
Ship	State	Description
Ada	(United Kingdom of Great Britain and Ireland) Isle of Man	The schooner sank in Liverpool Bay. Her crew were rescued by the Formby Lifeboat. She was on a voyage from Douglas to Liverpool, Lancashire
America	United Kingdom	The ship was driven ashore at Liverpool. She was on a voyage from Pernambuco, Brazil to Liverpool. She was refloated and taken in to Birkenhead, Cheshire.
Bertha	United Kingdom	The steamship was driven ashore on Holy Isle, in the Firth of Clyde. She was on a voyage from Glasgow, Renfrewshire to Dunkirk, Nord, France. Bertha was refloated on 1 March and beached at Lamlash, Isle of Arran.
Deux Eulalie	France	Deux Eulalie collided with Cilurnum (United Kingdom) and sank in the South Atlantic. Her crew were rescued.
Ethel	United Kingdom	The schooner ran aground on the Seven Stones Reef, Cornwall. She was on a voyage from Newport, Monmouthshire to Cádiz, Spain. She was refloated and taken in to Plymouth, Devon. Her captain and mate had their certificates withdrawn.
Hawk	United Kingdom	The schooner foundered with the loss of all five crew. She was on a voyage from Troon, Ayrshire to Dublin.
Protector	United States	The ship was driven ashore and wrecked in the Hillsboro Inlet. She was on a voyage from Pensacola, Florida to Stavanger, Norway.
Rio Grande	Brazil	The ship was driven ashore at Paraíba. She was on a voyage from Paraíba to Liverpool, Lancashire, United Kingdom. She was abandoned as a total loss.

== 20 February ==
List of shipwrecks: 20 February 1877
Ship	State	Description
Albania	Canada	The ship was driven ashore and wrecked between Audresselles and Cap Gris Nez, Pas-de-Calais, France with the loss of two of her 26 crew. She was on a voyage from Calcutta, India to London, United Kingdom.
Anenome	France	The schooner was wrecked near Perranporth, Cornwall, United Kingdom with the loss of all five crew.
Antelope	Norway	The brigantine capsized off Port Isaac, Cornwall with the loss of all but one of her seven crew. She was on a voyage from Morocco to Gloucester.
Betsey	United Kingdom	The schooner was driven ashore and damaged in the River Dee. She was on a voyage from Runcorn, Cheshire to Belfast, County Antrim.
Birkenhead, and Jane Millen	United Kingdom	The paddle steamer Birkenhead was run into by the brigantine Jane Millen in the River Mersey and was severely damaged. Jane Millen was beached at Egremont, Lancashire. She was on a voyage from Ballina, County Mayo to Liverpool, Lancashire.
Bon Jesus de Matsoninhos	Portugal	The brigantine was driven ashore and wrecked at Penrhos, Anglesey, United Kingdom. All on board were rescued. She was refloated on 17 March and towed in to Holyhead, Anglesey.
Brigand	United Kingdom	The steamship was driven against the pier at Bude, Cornwall and sank with the loss of all hands.
Bulla	(United Kingdom of Great Britain and Ireland) Jersey	The schooner was driven ashore and wrecked at Conway, Caernarfonshire.
Camel	United Kingdom	The schooner was driven ashore at Groomsport, County Down.
Cecile	France	The ship was driven ashore at Scrape Point, Isle of Wight, United Kingdom. She was on a voyage from Perros, Côtes-du-Nord to Southampton, Hampshire, United Kingdom.
Duke of Sutherland, and Stanley	United Kingdom	The paddle steamers collided and were both driven ashore at Holyhead. All on board both vessels were rescued. Duke of Sutherland was on a voyage from Dublin to Holyhead. Stanley was on a voyage from Holyhead to Dublin
Edith	United Kingdom	The schooner was run down and sunk 7 nautical miles (13 km) off the Newarp Lightship ( Trinity House) by the steamship Gilston (United Kingdom) with the loss of four of her six crew. Survivors were rescued by Gilston. Edith was on a voyage from Rochester, Kent to South Shields, County Durham.
Elizabeth	United Kingdom	The schooner was run down and sunk by the steamship Gilston (United Kingdom).
Emerald Isle	United Kingdom	The steamship was run into by two vessels and then driven ashore at Egremont. She was refloated the next day and taken in to Liverpoon in a leaky condition.
Emily	United Kingdom	The schooner was driven ashore at Douarnenez, Finistère, France. Her crew were rescued. She was on a voyage from Bilbao, Spain to Swansea, Glamorgan.
Fortitude	United Kingdom	The brigantine foundered off Bude with the loss of all seven people on board. She was on a voyage from Swansea to Littlehampton, Sussex.
Friendship	United Kingdom	The ship ran aground on the Studland Ledge, in the English Channel off the coast of Dorset. Her crew were rescued.
General Goodchild	United States	The ship collided with the steamship Stromboli (United Kingdom) and was driven ashore at Liverpool.
G. C. Cardwell	United Kingdom	The schooner was driven ashore and wrecked at Penrhos. All on board were rescued.
Helene	United Kingdom	The schooner was driven ashore between Donna Nook and Grainthorpe, Lincolnshire. Her three crew were rescued by the Donna Nook Lifeboat. She was on a voyage from Rye, Sussex to Hull, Yorkshire.
Henrietta	United Kingdom	The ship was wrecked in the River Mersey with the loss of four of her twelve crew. Survivors were rescued by a lifeboat.
Hope	United Kingdom	The smack sprang a leak and sank at Ryde, Isle of Wight. Her crew were rescued.
Imperatrice	(United Kingdom of Great Britain and Ireland) Guernsey	The smack ran aground on the Studland Ledge and was wrecked. Her crew were rescued.
James	United Kingdom	The brigantine foundered in the English Channel 18 nautical miles (33 km) south east of Beachy Head, Sussex with the loss of five of her seven crew. Survivors were rescued by the fishing smack No. 72 (France). James was on a voyage from South Shields to Plymouth, Devon.
Jeune Prosper	France	The brigantine was wrecked on the Doom Bar with the loss of three of her seven crew. Survivors were rescued by the Padstow Lifeboat Albert Edward ( Royal National Lifeboat Institution). Jeune Prosper was on a voyage from Swansea to Bordeaux, Gironde.
Johns and Roberts	United Kingdom	The ship was driven ashore and wrecked at Sandsend, Yorkshire. Her crew were rescued by rocket apparatus.
Kathleen	United Kingdom	The schooner ran aground and sank in Angle Bay. She was on a voyage from Swansea to La Rochelle, Charente-Inférieure, France.
Lizzie	United Kingdom	The schooner sank in Liverpool Bay. Her crew were rescued.
Lizzie Burrell	United Kingdom	The ship ran aground on the Devil's Bank, in Liverpool Bay. Her crew were rescued by the Formby Lifeboat.
Lord Londesborough	United Kingdom	The ketch was driven ashore and wrecked at Ryde. Her crew were rescued by the Ryde Lifeboat Captain Hans Busk ( Royal National Lifeboat Institution). Lord Londesborough was on a voyage from Portsmouth, Hampshire to Ryde.
Margaret	United Kingdom	The brig was driven ashore and wrecked at Havre de Grâce, Seine-Inférieure, Freance. Her crew were rescued.
Marie	France	The schooner ran aground in the Hellegat. She was on a voyage from Gioia Tauro, Italy to Rotterdam, South Holland, Netherlands. She had been refloated by 26 February.
Marie Eliza	France	The lugger sank off Cayeux-sur-Mer, Somme. Her crew survived. She was on a voyage from Par, Cornwall to Saint-Valery-sur-Somme, Somme.
Marietta	United Kingdom	The full-rigged ship ran aground on the Little Burbo Bank, in Liverpool Bay with the loss of seven of the 24 people on board. Four survivors were rescued by the Liverpool Lifeboat and thirteen by the New Brighton Lifeboat. She was on a voyage from Liverpool to Bombay, India.
Mary Ann	United Kingdom	The schooner was destroyed by fire at Portaferry, County Down.
Mizpah	United Kingdom	The schooner was damaged by fire at Liverpool.
Murton	United Kingdom	The steamship was run ashore at Clovelly, Devon. Her crew were rescued by the Coastguard using rocket apparatus. She was on a voyage from Hayle, Cornwall to Neath, Glamorgan. During an attempt to refloat her on 25 February, a gale sprang up. Sixteen people were rescued by rocket apparatus. She was refloated on 27 February and taken in to Clovelly in a leaky condition.
Meuse	France	The brigantine was driven ashore and wrecked near Braunton, Devon with the loss of four of her five crew.
Niord	United Kingdom	The ship was driven ashore at Cape San Antonio, Spain. She was on a voyage from Jamaica to Gibraltar.
Odin	Norway	The steamship struck the pier and sank at Dunkirk, Nord, France. She was on a voyage from "Vignaes" to Dunkirk.
Otago	(United Kingdom of Great Britain and Ireland) Isle of Man	The fishing lugger was driven ashore and wrecked at Port Erin. Her crew were rescued.
Plymouth	United Kingdom	The schooner was driven ashore and wrecked at Hawker's Cove, Cornwall. Her four crew were rescued by the Padstow Lifeboat Albert Edward ( Royal National Lifeboat Institution).
Pomona	United Kingdom	The brigantine was driven ashore and wrecked at Porthdinllaen, Caernarfonshire. Her crew were rescued.
Princess	United Kingdom	The ship was driven ashore at Hawker's Cove. Her crew were rescued. She was refloated the next day.
Rowantree	United Kingdom	The full-rigged ship was driven ashore at Penrhos. All on board were rescued.
Sarah Ellen	United Kingdom	The schooner was abandoned off Aberystwyth, Cardiganshire. Her crew were rescued by the Aberystwyth Lifeboat, which lost a crew member effecting the rescue. She was on a voyage from Plymouth to Belfast, County Antrim.
Slieve Donard	United Kingdom	The ship was driven ashore at Liverpool. She was on a voyage from Dundee, Forfarshire to Liverpool.
Swallow	United Kingdom	The Mersey Ferry was driven ashore at Egremont.
Thomas Aylan	United Kingdom	The schooner was driven ashore in Swanage Bay. She was on a voyage from Sunderland, County Durham to Saint-Malo, Ille-et-Vilaine. She was refloated and taken in to Cowes, Isle of Wight in a leaky condition.
Tobasca	United Kingdom	The ship ran aground on the Pluckington Bank, in Liverpool Bay.
Wilson	United Kingdom	The schooner was driven ashore at Havre de Grâce with the loss of two lives. She was on a voyage from Clackmannan to Honfleur.
Unnamed	Flag unknown	The brigantine was driven ashore and wrecked at Port Isaac, Cornwall with the loss of all hands.
Unnamed	Flag unknown	The brig was driven ashore near Tintagel, Cornwall.
Unnamed	Flag unknown	The brigantine was driven ashore at Crosby, Lancashire.

== 21 February ==
List of shipwrecks: 21 February 1877
Ship	State	Description
Acadian	United Kingdom	The ship ran aground on the Pluckington Bank, in Liverpool Bay. She was on a voyage from Galveston, Texas to Liverpool, Lancashire. She was refloated and taken in to Liverpool.
Ada	United Kingdom	The brig was driven ashore near Tintagel, Cornwall. Her nine crew were rescued. She was on a voyage from Dieppe, Seine-Inférieure, France to Pembrey, Carmarthenshire.
Ada Melmore	United Kingdom	The barque was driven towards the shore at Port Isaac, Cornwall. Ten of her crew were taken off by the Port Isaac Lifeboat. She was on a voyage from Glasgow, Renfrewshire to Montevideo, Uruguay. Ada Melmore was towed in to Penarth, Glamorgan by the tugs Admiral and Lord Derby (both United Kingdom).
Adolphe Marie	France	The ship was wrecked off Boscastle, Cornwall with the loss of all hands. She was on a voyage from Swansea, Glamorgan to Nantes, Loire-Inférieure.
Adventure	United Kingdom	The schooner was abandoned off Fishguard, Pembrokeshire. Her crew were rescued by the Fishguard Lifeboat. She was on a voyage from Portmadoc, Caernarfonshire to Bridgwater, Somerset.
Bella	(United Kingdom of Great Britain and Ireland) Jersey	The barque was driven ashore and wrecked at Penmaenmawr, Caernarfonshire with the loss of all hands.
Beverley	United Kingdom	The steamship was driven ashore 6 nautical miles (11 km) north of Bayonne, Basses-Pyrénées, France. She was on a voyage from Dunkirk, Nord, France to Bilbao, Spain.
B. F. Marsh	United States	The schooner was driven ashore at Goodwick, Pembrokeshire. Her crew were rescued by the Fishguard Lifeboat. She was on a voyage from Liverpool to Havana, Cuba.
Carl Benduhn	Germany	The schooner was abandoned at sea. Her four crew were rescued by the steamship Nord (France).
Carn Bray	United Kingdom	The ship ran aground at Barmouth, Caernarfonshire. Her crew were rescued. She was on a voyage from Glasgow, Renfrewshire to Penzance, Cornwall.
Charles and Ann, and G. W. V.	United Kingdom	Charles and Ann collided with G. W. V. and sank at New Ferry, Cheshire with the loss of all hands. G. W. V. was severely damaged and was beached.
Due Sorelli	Austria-Hungary	The ship was wrecked on Curzola. She was on a voyage from Trieste to Bordeaux, Gironde, France.
Eliza McLaughlin	United Kingdom	The barque was driven ashore near Knocke, West Flanders, Belgium. She was on a voyage from King's Lynn, Norfolk to Baltimore, Maryland, United States.
Florence Oulton	United Kingdom	The ship foundered. Her fourteen crew took to two boats; five of them were rescued on 26 February by Trowbridge (United Kingdom).
Frere	Malta	The steamship sank at Penarth, Glamorgan.
Gem	United Kingdom	The brig ran aground near the Chapman Lightship ( Trinity House), in the North Sea off the coast of Essex. She was on a voyage from Newcastle upon Tyne, Northumberland to Woolwich, Kent.
Isabella and Jane	United Kingdom	The ship was driven ashore at Ballyhalbert, County Down.
James and Maria	United Kingdom	The schooner was driven ashore at Bull Bay, Anglesey.
Louisa	United Kingdom	The brig was driven ashore and wrecked at Dieppe, Seine-Inférieure, France. Her crew were rescued. She was on a voyage from Sunderland, County Durham to Trouville-sur-Mer, Calvados, France.
Marie Joseph	United Kingdom	The ship foundered in Croisic Bay. Her crew were rescued. She was on a voyage from Santander, Spain to Plymouth, Devon.
Martha Stevens	United Kingdom	The sailing barge was driven ashore and wrecked at Oye, Pas-de-Calais, France. Her crew were rescued. She was on a voyage from Goole, Yorkshire to Plymouth, Devon.
Novel	United Kingdom	The brig was driven ashore. She was on a voyage from London to Middlesbrough, Yorkshire. She was refloated and taken in to Harwich, Essex.
Orwell	United Kingdom	The steamship ran aground on the Whitestone Shoal, in the North Sea off the coast of County Durham. She was on a voyage from Sunderland to London. She was refloated and resumed her voyage.
Vigee	France	The brig was beached at Penarth, Glamorgan, United Kingdom. She was on a voyage from Cardiff, Glamorgan to Nantes, Loire-Inférieure.
Unnamed	United Kingdom	The dredger was run into by the brig Kate (United Kingdom) and sank at Liverpool, Lancashire.
Unnamed	United Kingdom	The barge sank in the River Thames as Horsleydown, Middlesex with the loss of two lives.

== 22 February ==
List of shipwrecks: 22 February 1877
Ship	State	Description
Abando	Spain	The barque ran aground at Bilbao. She was on a voyage from Bilbao to Havana, Cuba. She was refloated and attempted to put back to Bilbao, but ran aground again and was wrecked.
Fleetwing	United Kingdom	The sloop ran aground on the Wielingen Sandbank, in the North Sea off the Belgian coast and capsized. Her crew were rescued. She was on a voyage from Antwerp, Belgium to Faversham, Kent.
Golden Fleece	United States	The clipper ship ran aground in the mouth of the River Plate. She was refloated and surveyed at Montevideo, Uruguay where she was deemed a constructive total loss.
Marguerite	United Kingdom	The steamship was driven ashore in the River Thames at Gravesend, Kent. She was on a voyage from Antwerp to London.
Nereus	United Kingdom	The ship ran aground in the River Liffey. She was on a voyage from San Francisco, California to Dublin.

== 23 February ==
List of shipwrecks: 23 February 1877
Ship	State	Description
Angharad	United Kingdom	The ship struck a sunken wreck off Start Point, Devon and was damaged. She put in to Dartmouth, Devon in a leaky condition. She was on a voyage from Hayling Island, Hampshire to Baltimore, Maryland, United States.
Ann Chaddock	United Kingdom	The ship was wrecked at Constitución, Chile. Her crew were rescued.
Lady Eleanor	United Kingdom	The schooner was driven ashore 2 nautical miles (3.7 km) east of Honfleur, Manche, France. She was on a voyage from Sunderland, County Durham to Rouen, Seine-Inférieure, France. She was refloated.
Superb	United Kingdom	The ship was driven ashore and wrecked at Port-en-Bessin, Calvados, France. Her crew were rescued.
Sveridge	Sweden	The ship ran aground on the Pickles Reef. She was on a voyage from Pensacola, Florida, United States to Liverpool, Lancashire, United Kingdom.
Swift	United Kingdom	The brigantine was driven ashore at Dartmouth. She was on a voyage from Seaham, County Durham to Dartmouth. She was refloated.
Weaver Belle	United Kingdom	The ship was driven ashore at Westport, County Mayo.
Two unnamed vessels	France	The ship was driven ashore and wrecked at Santoña, Spain with the loss of all hands.
Unnamed	United Kingdom	The ship was driven ashore and wrecked at Santoña with the loss of all hands.

== 24 February ==
List of shipwrecks: 24 February 1877
Ship	State	Description
Ayton	United Kingdom	The steamship struck a sunken wreck at South Shields, County Durham. She was on a voyage from South Shields to Odesa, Russia. She put back to South Shields in a leaky condition.
Benjamin Willis	United States	The schooner capsized off Long Island, New York with the loss of three of her crew.
Eli Whitney	New Zealand	The steamer Taupo (New Zealand) collided with the 540-ton hulk Eli Whitney in Wellington Harbour. Taupo's captain thought it was a minor blow with no damage, and Taupo continued on its way. Eli Whitney however, was holed and sank quickly. The hulk-keeper made it to shore, but his wife and child were drowned.
Freeman	United Kingdom	The schooner was driven ashore on Long Island with the loss of three lives. Survivors were rescued by the Long Island Lifeboat.
Josiah Hedden	United States	The schooner was driven ashore on Long Island with the loss of four of her crew. Survivors were rescued by the schooner Freeman (United States).
Pera	United Kingdom	The steamship ran aground at Ballina, County Mayo. She was on a voyage from Liverpool, Lancashire to Ballina. She was refloated the next day and towed in to Ballina.
Talisman	United Kingdom	The ship ran aground in the Thanlwin. She was refloated and resumed her voyage.
Trident	United Kingdom	The steamship was driven ashore at Rangoon, Burma. She was refloated and taken in to Rangoon.
Unnamed	Flag unknown	The schooner collided with the steamship Ohio (Flag unknown) and sank at New York City, United States.
Three unnamed vessels	United States	The schooners were wrecked on Long Island, New York with the loss of eleven lives.

== 25 February ==
List of shipwrecks: 25 February 1877
Ship	State	Description
Knight Templar	United Kingdom	The steamship struck a floating wreck and was holed. She was beached on "Galita Island", Beylik of Tunis. She was on a voyage from Cardiff, Glamorgan to Bombay, India.

== 26 February ==
List of shipwrecks: 26 February 1877
Ship	State	Description
B. F. Nash	United Kingdom	The ship was driven ashore and severely damaged at Fishguard, Pembrokeshire. Her crew were rescued by the Fishguard Lifeboat.
Brothers, and Ebenezer	United Kingdom	The paddle tug was driven ashore and wrecked at Cullercoats, Northumberland. Her crew were rescued. She was towing the lighter Ebenezer, which also came ashore and was wrecked.

== 27 February ==
List of shipwrecks: 27 February 1877
Ship	State	Description
Amitie	France	The brig exploded at Cardiff, Glamorgan, United Kingdom. A crew member was severely wounded.
Cymru	United Kingdom	The pilot cutter was run down and sunk by the steamship Gresham (United Kingdom) at Newport, Monmouthshire with the loss of both people on board.
Emma	United Kingdom	The ship was driven ashore at Flamborough Head, Yorkshire. She was on a voyage from Odesa, Russia to Montrose, Forfarshire. She was refloated the next day and towed in to Bridlington, Yorkshire.
Express	New Zealand	The 136-ton steamship parted her cable while moored at Riverton and swung onto rocks, holing herself. Despite efforts to save her, the hole was too great for pumps to keep up, and she eventually sank on 1 March.
Margaretha	Germany	The brig was wrecked at Petit Trou, Dominican Republic.
Montebello	Ottoman Empire	The ship was driven ashore and wrecked at Cape Doro, Greece with the loss of her captain.
Unda	Norway	The schooner was driven ashore and wrecked at Galveston, Texas, United States. She was on a voyage from Havre de Grâce, Seine-Inférieure, France to Galveston.

== 28 February ==
List of shipwrecks: 28 February 1877
Ship	State	Description
Gleaner	United Kingdom	The brigantine ran aground at the mouth of the River Mersey. She was on a voyage from Liverpool, Lancashire to Gijón, Spain. She was refloated and beached at New Brighton, Cheshire in a waterlogged condition. She was refloated the next day and taken in to Liverpool.
Quatre Sorelle	Italy	The brig ran aground at Civita Vecchia. She was on a voyage from Swansea, Glamorgan, United Kingdom to Civita Vecchia. She was refloated.
Savant	United Kingdom	The schooner ran aground on the Little Burbo Bank, in Liverpool Bay. She was refloated with assistance from the tug Lord Lyons (United Kingdom) and beached at Tranmere, Cheshire, being severely leaky.

== Unknown date ==
List of shipwrecks: Unknown date in February 1877
Ship	State	Description
Adam Sedgewick	(United Kingdom of Great Britain and Ireland) Jersey	The smack foundered off Anglesey with the loss of all hands.
Annie	United Kingdom	The schooner was wrecked in Saint Tudwal's Islands, Caernarfonshire. Her five crew were rescued by the Abersoch Lifeboat.
Annie	United Kingdom	The brigantine was driven ashore at Cape Nassau, British Guiana.
Barbara Taylor	United Kingdom	The ship was driven ashore. She was on a voyage from Bangkok, Siam to Cheribon, Netherlands East Indies. She was refloated and taken in to Batavia, Netherlands East Indies, where she arrived on 20 February.
Bartolotto Savona	Italy	The ship was driven ashore at Marcus Hook, Pennsylvania, United States. She was on a voyage from Philadelphia, Pennsylvania to Liverpool, Lancashire, United Kingdom. She was refloated and put back to Philadelphia in a leaky condition.
Bessie	United Kingdom	The brigantine was wrecked in the Beagle Islands, Western Australia between 15 and 18 February. Her crew were rescued.
Caspian	United Kingdom	The steamship ran aground at the mouth of the Potomac River. She was on a voyage from Baltimore, Maryland, United States to Liverpool. She was refloated on 5 February and resumed her voyage.
Champion	United Kingdom	The ship was abandoned in the Atlantic Ocean before 13 February.
Conquest	United Kingdom	The fishing smack foundered in the North Sea with the loss of all six crew. (Note: Loss may have been on 13 January, when many fishing smacks foundered.)
Delphin	Russia	The ship ran aground on the Lillegrunden, in the Baltic Sea. She was on a voyage from Liepāja to Leith, Lothian, United Kingdom. She was refloated and put in to Copenhagen, Denmark.
Emma	United Kingdom	The brig ran aground on the Buxey Sand, in the North Sea off the coast of Essex. She was refloated with assistance from the smacks Emily, New Blossom and Qui Vive (all United Kingdom).
Enterprise	United Kingdom	The fishing smack foundered in the North Sea with the loss of all hands.
Flying Foam	United Kingdom	The fishing smack foundered in the North Sea with the loss of all hands.
Franconia	Germany	The steamship was driven ashore in the San Blas Islands, United States of Colombia. All on board were rescued. She was refloated and takein in to Colón, United States of Panama.
George Cromwell	United States	The steamship was wrecked off Cape St. Mary's, Nova Scotia, Canada on or before 18 February with the loss of all 30 people on board. She was on a voyage from New York to Saint John's, Newfoundland Colony.
Golden City	United Kingdom	The barque foundered off Ouessant, Finistère, France between 8 and 12 February. Her 26 crew were rescued by the steamship Black Sea (United Kingdom). Golden City was on a voyage from South Shields, County Durham to Genoa, Italy.
Holyrood	United Kingdom	The ship foundered in the English Channel off the coast of Pas-de-Calais, France.
J. W. Welt	Germany	The schooner was abandoned in the Atlantic Ocean before 17 February. She was towed in to Ferrol, Spain in early July by the steamship Colón (Spain).
Kingfisher	United Kingdom	The fishing smack foundered in the North Sea with the loss of all hands.
Kronprinzen	Sweden	The ship was wrecked on the Colorados. Her crew were rescued. She was on a voyage from New Orleans, Louisiana, United States to Liverpool.
Lau-Buru	Spain	The barque foundered in the Atlantic Ocean. Her crew were rescued. She was on a voyage from A Coruña to Barcelona.
Leif	Flag unknown	The ship was wrecked on Hunting Island, South Carolina, United States. She was on a voyage from Liverpool to Savannah, Georgia, United States.
Letty Gales	United Kingdom	The barque was wrecked on Pratas Island with some loss of life.
Lincoln	United Kingdom	The ship ran aground at Aracaju, Brazil. She was on a voyage from Aracaju to Liverpool. She was refloated and resumed her voyage, but put in to Barbados in a leaky condition on 10 February.
Lovina	United Kingdom	The ship was driven ashore at Penarth, Glamorgan. She was on a voyage from Llanelly, Glamorgan to the Clyde. She was refloated on 24 February and towed in to Swansea, Glamorgan in a leaky condition.
Lucy Bartram	United Kingdom	The ship was lost at sea, according to a message in a tin that washed up at Seascale, Cumberland in mid-February.
L. Warre	France	The ship was abandoned in the Atlantic Ocean before 12 February.
Lunford	United Kingdom	The fishing smack foundered in the North Sea with the loss of all hands.
Maria	United Kingdom	The ship was lost before 17 February with the loss of all but one of her crew. She was on a voyage from Doboy, Georgia, United States to Belfast, County Antrim.
Massilia	United Kingdom	The ship was abandoned in the Atlantic Ocean before 25 February. Her crew were rescued. She was on a voyage from the Bull River to London.
Melpomene	United Kingdom	The ship foundered in the English Channel off the coast of Pas-de-Calais.
Minna	Germany	The galiot foundered in the North Sea. Her crew survived. She was on a voyage from Newcastle upon Tyne, Northumberland, United Kingdom to Greetsiel.
Protector	United Kingdom	The fishing smack foundered in the North Sea with the loss of all hands.
Qui Vive	United Kingdom	The fishing smack foundered in the North Sea with the loss of all hands.
Rex	Norway	The barque was driven ashore near Farsund. Her crew were rescued. She was on a voyage from an English port to Arendal.
Roma	United Kingdom	The brigantine was driven ashore at the Landguard Fort, Felixtowe, Suffolk. She was refloated with assistance from the tug Promise and the smack Volunteer (both United Kingdom.
Supply	United Kingdom	The schooner was lost. Her crew were rescued by the Fishguard Lifeboat.
Tanaro	United Kingdom	The brig was lost off the Spanish coast. Wreckage from the ship came ashore at Huelva in mid-February.
V. A. N. E.	United Kingdom	The fishing smack foundered in the North Sea with the loss of all hands.
Wasp	United Kingdom	The smack was abandoned in the North Sea 100 nautical miles (190 km) off Spurn Point, Yorkshire on or before 2 February.
William and Sarah	United Kingdom	The fishing smack foundered in the North Sea with the loss of all hands.
