= Hyder Ally (ship) =

Several vessels have been named Hyder Ally (or Hyder Alley, or Hyder Ali) for Hyder Ali:

- Hyder Ally – an American privateer (40 tons, 2 guns, 40 men), bound from Boston, Massachusetts on a cruise; taken on 15 July 1782 off Sandy Hook, New Jersey by HMS Bonetta and brought into New York.
- Hyder Ally (1814 ship) was a privateer from Portland, Maine, that received a letter of marque in 1814. She sailed to the eastern Indian Ocean where she captured three prizes before the British Royal Navy captured her in 1814.
- Hyder Ally (1815 ship) was a merchant ship launched in the United States in 1815. She came to the United Kingdom in 1816. In 1817 she rescued the crew of another vessel. She was wrecked in 1821.
