= Garthland (ship) =

At least two vessels have been named Garthland, possibly for Garthland Castle.

- Garthland (1795 ship) was launched at Chester in 1795 as a West Indiaman. She foundered in December 1821.
- Garthland, of 107 GRT, was launched at Glasgow in 1876 and disappeared, believed foundered, in 1877.
