= Hyder Ally (1815 ship) =

Merchant vessel (1815–1821)

History

United Kingdom
- Name: Hyder Ally
- Namesake: Hyder Ali
- Launched: 1813, or 1815, United States
- Fate: Wrecked 1821

General characteristics
- Tons burthen: 250, or 260 (bm)
- Sail plan: Snow

Hyder Ally (or Hyder Alley) was a merchant ship launched in the United States in 1813 or 1815. She came to the United Kingdom in 1816. In 1817 she rescued the crew of another vessel. She was wrecked in 1821.

== Career ==
Hyder Alley arrived in Falmouth in October 1816. She sailed from Gravesend, Kent on 3 December, bound for New York.

Hyder Ally first appeared in the volume of Lloyd's Register (LR) for 1816.

Year	Master	Owner	Trade	Source & notes
1816	T.Collins	Captain & Co.	London–New York	LR; pine sides

On 27 February 1817, the crew of William, of Hull, Baker, master, abandoned their vessel in the Atlantic as being leaky, much damaged, and in want of provisions; she had left Hull on 28 November, bound for New York. Hyder Alley, also New York-bound, took off the crew. However, eight men from Hyder Alley, Howe, master, volunteered to try to bring William in to a port. William, with her crew from Hyder Alley, arrived at Newport, Rhode Island on 10 March. (Note: William, of 205 tons (bm), Baker, master, had been launched at Freeport in 1805.)

Year	Master	Owner	Trade	Source & notes
1819	Howe	Captain & Co.	London–New York	Register of Shipping
1820	T.Collins; Applln	Captain & Co.	London–New York	LR; pine sides; good repair 1812
1821	E.Ripley	B.Prince	London–New York	LR; pine sides; small repairs 1819

== Fate ==
A gale at Cork on 28 December 1821 drove Hyder Ally (a hulk), on shore, doing much damage.
