= Garthland (1795 ship) =

British merchant ship (1795–1821)

History

Great Britain
- Name: Garthland
- Owner: 1795: Walter Ritchie & Sons; 1811: Goodwin; 1818: J.Knight
- Builder: Troughton, Chester
- Launched: 1795
- Fate: Foundered December 1821

General characteristics
- Tons burthen: 257, or 264, or 271, or 275 (bm)
- Complement: 18
- Armament: 1798: 6 × 4-pounder guns; 1800: 6 × 6-pounder guns; 1801: 6 × 6-pounder + 2 × 4-pounder guns; 1807: 12 × 6 & 12-pounder cannons; 1809: 6 × 6-pounder guns + 6 × 12-pounder carronades; 1811: 6 × 12-pounder carronades

Garthland was launched at Chester in 1795 as a West Indiaman. She foundered in December 1821.

== Career ==
Missing pages in Lloyd's Register (LR), for 1796 resulted in Garthland first appeared in the register in 1797.

Garthland's first owner was Walter Ritchie & Sons. At the beginning of the 19th century, Walter Ritchie & Sons was one of the best known Greenock firms of shipowners. In 1808 Walter Ritchie moved to London to manage his London business. His sons then took charge of eleven ships (including Garthland), "by far the finest mercantile fleet...in Great Britain belonging to one firm."

Year	Master	Owner	Trade	Source & notes
1797	John Reid; J.Ramsoy	Ritchie & Co.	Greenock–Jamaica	LR
1798	J.Ramsey; John Reid	Ritchie & Co.	Greenock–Jamaica	LR
1800	Alexander; J.Leetch; J.Keld	Ritchie & Co.	Greenock–Jamaica	LR
1801	J.Reid	Ritchie & Co.	Greenock–Jamaica	LR
1802	J.Reid; J.Bradshaw	Ritchie & Co.	Greenock–Jamaica	LR

Garthland disappeared from Lloyd's Register from the issue for 1803, but did appear in the Register of Shipping (RS), i 1804 and 1806.

Year	Master	Owner	Trade	Source & notes
1804 & 1806	M'Echrin	Ritchie & Co.	Greenock–Jamaica	RS

Captain James Barkley acquired a letter of marque on 21 July 1807. He was still master in the first half 1809, but in the second half a Captain Shelton had replaced him.

Year	Master	Owner	Trade	Source & notes
1809	J.Barkley	Ritchie & Co.	Liverpool–Charleston	RS; small repairs 1807
1811	J.Barkley; J.Watson	Ritchie & Co. Goodwin	Greenock–West Indies; London–Jamaica	RS; small repairs 1807

Garthland returned to Lloyd's Register (LR), in 1811.

Year	Master	Owner	Trade	Source & notes
1811	J.Watson	Goodwin	London–Jamaica	LR

On 10 March 1812 Garthland, Watson, master, ran ashore on the Ryde Sand. She got off that same night and proceeded on her journey from London to Jamaica.

Year	Master	Owner	Trade	Source & notes
1813	J.Watson; Horn	Goodwin	London–Jamaica	LR
1816	T.Horn; J.Cassie	Goodwin	London–Saint Lucia	LR
1818	Cassie; J.Knight	Goodwin	Plymouth–Jamaica; London–Quebec	LR; new wales 1813 & repairs 1814
1818	Cassie; J.Knight	Goodwin	Plymouth–Jamaica; London–Quebec	LR; new wales 1813 & repairs 1814
1819	J.Knight	Captain & Co.	London–Quebec	LR; new keel 1813; new topsides and small repair 1818

== Fate ==
Garthland, John Knight, master, was disabled in the Atlantic Ocean on 12 December 1821. Three crew died before 19 December when Hope, Bloomfield, master, rescued the survivors. Garthland was on a voyage from Saint John, New Brunswick to London.
