= List of shipwrecks in September 1847 =

The list of shipwrecks in September 1847 includes ships sunk, foundered, wrecked, grounded, or otherwise lost during September 1847.

== 1 September ==
List of shipwrecks: 1 September 1847
Ship	State	Description
Smyrna	United States	The ship was wrecked on a reef north of the Caicos Islands. She was on a voyage from Bordeaux, Gironde, France to New Orleans, Louisiana.
Susanna	United Kingdom	The sloop was driven ashore and wrecked in Camsdown Bay. She was on a voyage from Loch Erribol to Liverpool, Lancashire. She was refloated the next day and beached.

== 2 September ==
List of shipwrecks: 2 September 1847
Ship	State	Description
Clyde	United Kingdom	The ship was sighted whilst on a voyage from Grangemouth, Stirlingshire to Great Yarmouth, Norfolk. No further trace, presumed foundered with the loss of all hands.
Lord Redhaven	United Kingdom	The sloop was driven ashore at Aberdeen. Her crew were rescued. She was on a voyage from East Wemyss, Fife to Aberdeen.
Marchioness of Huntley	United Kingdom	The ship was wrecked at Portskerra, Sutherland. Her crew were rescued. She was on a voyage from Liverpool, Lancashire to Portskerra.
Mary and Joseph	(United Kingdom of Great Britain and Ireland) Isle of Man	The schooner was driven ashore at Thurso, Caithness. Her crew were rescued. She was on a voyage from Peterhead, Aberdeenshire to Belfast, County Antrim.
Moy	United Kingdom	The ship was wrecked on the Isauld Rocks, off the coast of Caithness with the loss of all hands.
Nancy	United Kingdom	The sloop was driven ashore and wrecked at Thurso. Her crew were rescued.
Reliance	United Kingdom	The ship was driven ashore and wrecked 4 nautical miles (7.4 km) east of Portrush, County Antrim. She was on a voyage from the Clyde to Quebec City, Province of Canada, British North America.

== 3 September ==
List of shipwrecks: 3 September 1847
Ship	State	Description
Georgina	United Kingdom	The ship ran aground near Warnemünde. She was on a voyage from Stockton-on-Tees, County Durham to Wismar. She was refloated the next day and taken in to Warnemünde.
Jean	United Kingdom	The ship ran aground on the Domesnes Reef, in the Baltic Sea. She was refloated the next day and put back to Riga, Russia.
Joseph Alexander	United Kingdom	The sloop was in collision with the brig Hope (United Kingdom) and was abandoned in the North Sea off Happisburgh, Norfolk. Joseph Alexander was on a voyage from Great Yarmouth, Norfolk to Goole, Yorkshire. Also reported as capsizing in a squall with the loss of three lives.
Joseph and Mary Ann	United Kingdom	The ship collided with the brig Beaver (United Kingdom) in the North Sea off Happisburg and was abandoned. Her crew were rescued by Beaver. Joseph and Mary Ann was on a voyage from London to Leeds, Yorkshire. She was driven ashore at Happisburgh the next day in a derelict condition. She was refloated on 8 September and taken in to Great Yarmouth, Norfolk.
Mary Ann	United Kingdom	The ship abandoned off Flamborough Head, Yorkshire with the loss of four of her nine crew. Survivors were rescued by William (Prussia). Mary Ann was on a voyage from Memel, Prussia to Newcastle upon Tyne, Northumberland. She was taken into South Shields, County Durham in a severely damaged condition on 15 October.
Reliance	United Kingdom	The ship was abandoned off the Giant's Causeway, County Antrim.

== 5 September ==
List of shipwrecks: 5 September 1847
Ship	State	Description
Fanny	France	The whaler was driven ashore on "Urap, Krivell's Islands" and was abandoned by her crew.
Glocester	United States	The ship was driven ashore and wrecked at "Loran", Nova Scotia, British North America. Her crew were rescued. She was on a voyage from Boston, Massachusetts to Sydney, Nova Scotia.
Harlequin	Royal Navy	The Racer-class brig-sloop ran aground at Smyrna, Ottoman Empire. She was refloated the next day.
Jonge Caroline	Belgium	The koff capsized in the Weser with the loss of all hands. She was subsequently taken in to Texel, North Holland, Netherlands.
Sarah Jane	(United Kingdom of Great Britain and Ireland) New Zealand	The schooner was wrecked on the east coast of New Zealand. Her crew were rescued.
Superb	Malta	The barque was driven ashore and wrecked west of Tarifa, Spain . She was on a voyage from Odesa to an English port. She was refloated on 24 September and taken in to Gibraltar.

== 6 September ==
List of shipwrecks: 6 September 1847
Ship	State	Description
Countess of Mar	United Kingdom	The schooner was wrecked in the Farne Islands, Northumberland. All seven people on board were rescued. She was on a voyage from Glasgow, Renfrewshire to Newcastle upon Tyne, Northumberland.
Marian Lindsay	United Kingdom	The ship was wrecked on the Ton Banks, off the coast of County Londonderry. Her crew were rescued. She was on a voyage from the Clyde to Saint Stephen, New Brunswick, British North America.
Queen of the Tyne	United Kingdom	The ship ran aground on the Burbo Bank, in Liverpool Bay and wa damaged. She was on a voyage from Liverpool, Lancashire to "Wyberg". She was refloated and put back to Liverpool.
Twe Gebruders	Netherlands	The ship foundered off Brouwershaven, Zeeland. She was on a voyage from London, United Kingdom to Workum, Friesland.
William Boothby	United Kingdom	The brig collided with Queen Ann ( (United Kingdom of Great Britain and Ireland) British North America) and was abandoned. Her crew were rescued by Queen Ann. William Boothby was on a voyage from Windsor, Province of Canada, British North America to Boston, Massachusetts, United States.

== 7 September ==
List of shipwrecks: 7 September 1847
Ship	State	Description
Albion	United Kingdom	The ship ran aground on the Remer Shoals. She was on a voyage from Pictou, Nova Scotia to New York, United States.
Armand	France	The ship was wrecked 15 leagues (45 nautical miles (83 km)) north of Montevideo, Uruguay with the loss of four of her crew. She was on a voyage from Havre de Grâce, Seine-Inférieure to the Cape Verde Islands and Montevideo.
Diadem	United Kingdom	The brig was wrecked on Isla Aves. Her crew were rescued. She was on a voyage from Liverpool to La Guaira, Venezuela.
Freiheit	Lübeck	The ship was driven ashore and wrecked on Stroma, Caithness, United Kingdom. She was on a voyage from Danzig to Liverpool, Lancashire, United Kingdom. She was refloated on 11 September.
Victory	United Kingdom	The ship was driven ashore in the "River Altomhoa". She was on a voyage from Darien to Chatham, Kent. She was consequently condemned.

== 8 September ==
List of shipwrecks: 8 September 1847
Ship	State	Description
Emanuel	Norway	The ship ran aground and was wrecked off Bornholm, Denmark with the loss of one life. She was on a voyage from Pillau, Prussia to Stavanger.
Harmonie	Kingdom of Hanover	The ship was driven ashore and wrecked on Bornholm with the loss of all but her captain from her six crew. She was on a voyage from Kronstadt, Russia to Helsingør, Denmark.
Helene	Flag unknown	The ship was wrecked off Bornholm with the loss of two of her crew. She was on a voyage from Carlshamn to Hasle, Bornholm.
Nathaniel	United Kingdom	The ship ran aground on the Whitby Rock and was damaged. She was refloated.
Rhoda	United Kingdom	The ship was collided with Roger Sherman (United States) and sank in the Atlantic Ocean. Six crew were rescued by Roger Sherman. Rhoda was on a voyage from Marseille, Bouches-du-Rhône, France to Falmouth, Cornwall.

== 9 September ==
List of shipwrecks: 9 September 1847
Ship	State	Description
Adler	Prussia	The ship was wrecked at Rügenwalde.
Argo	United Kingdom	The ship was driven ashore at Bristol, Gloucestershire. She was on a voyage from Bristol to Quebec City, Province of Canada, British North America. She was later refloated.
Christina Elsabea	Sweden	The ship was wrecked off "Hornbeck", Denmark. She was on a voyage from London, United Kingdom to Sundsvall.
Courier	Flag unknown	The ship was driven ashore near Misdroy, Prussia.
Ludovico	Danzig	The ship was driven ashore near "Winthagen". Her crew were rescued. She was on a voyage from Danzig to Chatham, Kent, United Kingdom.
Retreat	United Kingdom	The ship was driven ashore on "Strones Island". She was refloated on 11 September and taken in to Bordeaux, Gironde, France.

== 10 September ==
List of shipwrecks: 10 September 1847
Ship	State	Description
Eliza Gillis	United Kingdom	The ship was wrecked on Ham Island, British North America. She was on a voyage from Londonderry to Saint Stephen, New Brunswick, British North America.
Forth	United Kingdom	The ship was driven ashore at Höganäs, Sweden. She was on a voyage from Hull to Windau. She was refloated and resumed her voyage.
Four Brothers	United Kingdom	The ship was driven ashore at Winterton-on-Sea, Norfolk. She was on a voyage from Rye, Sussex to Goole, Yorkshire. She was refloated and resumed her voyage.
Margaret Jamieson	United Kingdom	The smack sank at Sanda Island. Her crew were rescued. She was on a voyage from Irvine, Ayrshire to Larne, County Antrim.
Sir James Kempt	United Kingdom	The full-rigged ship ran aground off Kronstadt, Russia. She was on a voyage from Kronstadt to Liverpool, Lancashire. She was refloated and resumed her voyage.

== 11 September ==
List of shipwrecks: 11 September 1847
Ship	State	Description
Aurora	United Kingdom	The ship ran aground on the Sunderland Bank, in the Irish Sea off the coast of Lancashire. She was refloated on 15 September and taken in to Glasson Dock, Lancashire.
Brothers	(United Kingdom of Great Britain and Ireland) New South Wales	The ketch was wrecked at Crondy. Her crew were rescued. She was on a voyage from Sydney to Twofold Bay.
Clarence	(United Kingdom of Great Britain and Ireland) Van Diemen's Land	The schooner was wrecked at Port Fairy, New South Wales. All on board were rescued. She was on a voyage from Port Phillip, South Australia to Warrnambool, New South Wales. She had been refloated by 17 November.
John Main	United Kingdom	The smack capsized and sank in the Clyde near Port Glasgow, Renfrewshire.
Martha	United Kingdom	The ship collided with Ann and Mary (United Kingdom) and foundered in the North Sea off the coast of Norfolk. Her crew were rescued.
Vine	United Kingdom	The schooner was wrecked at Caernarfon with the loss of two of the three people on board. She was on a voyage from Porthdinllaen to Bangor, Caernarfonshire.

== 12 September ==
List of shipwrecks: 12 September 1847
Ship	State	Description
Pratencall	United Kingdom	The ship was driven ashore at Point La Haye, Newfoundland, British North America. She was on a voyage from Cape Breton Island, Nova Scotia, British North America to London.
Ruby	United Kingdom	The ship ran aground off the Runnel Stone and was damaged. She was on a voyage from Newport, Monmouthshire to London. She put in to Penzance, Cornwall.
Syria	United Kingdom	The barque was driven ashore at Dundalk, County Louth. She was on a voyage from Liverpool, Lancashire to Halifax, Nova Scotia and/or Montreal, Province of Canada, British North America. She was refloated on 16 September and put back to Liverpool.
No. 1	Imperial Russian Navy	The barge was driven ashore on Uch Island (Note: The island was located between the Agrakhan Peninsula and Chechen Island; the terrain of the area is fluid and has changed considerably since 1847.) in the Caspian Sea. She was on a voyage from Astrakhan to Petrovskoye. No. 1 was subsequently refloated.

== 13 September ==
List of shipwrecks: 13 September 1847
Ship	State	Description
Indus	United Kingdom	The ship was driven ashore and wrecked at Cape Heinchenbrook, British North America. Her crew were rescued. She was on a voyage from Pugwash, Nova Scotia, British North America to Liverpool, Lancashire.
John Cock	United Kingdom	The ship was driven ashore at Cape Janissary, in the Dardanelles. She was on a voyage from Batoumi, Russia to a British port. She was refloated on 16 September.
Msta (Мста)	Imperial Russian Navy	The transport ship ran aground between Bolshoy Beryozovy and Zapadny Beryozovy in the Gulf of Finland. Her crew were rescued. She was on a voyage from Kronstadt to Sveaborg, Grand Duchy of Finland. Salvage efforts were unsuccessful and she had sunk by 30 September.
Sterling	United Kingdom	The brig foundered in the North Sea. Her crew were rescued by the brig Laura (Sweden).

== 14 September ==
List of shipwrecks: 14 September 1847
Ship	State	Description
Countess of Mar	United Kingdom	The ship was wrecked in the Farne Islands, Northumberland. Her crew were rescued.
Kathleen	United Kingdom	The ship departed from South Shields, County Durham for Great Yarmouth, Norfolk. No further trace, presumed foundered in the North Sea with the loss of all hands.

== 15 September ==
List of shipwrecks: 15 September 1847
Ship	State	Description
Ann	United Kingdom	The ship was driven ashore at Donegal.
Baleinier	France	The sloop was driven ashore at Havre de Grâce, Seine-Inférieure.
Comet	United States	The ship foundered off Cape Race, Newfoundland, British North America.
Jeannies	United Kingdom	The ship was driven ashore and severely damaged at Troon, Ayrshire.
Jupiter	France	The ship ran aground on Scroby Sands, Norfolk, United Kingdom.
Lowestoff	(United Kingdom of Great Britain and Ireland) New Zealand	The brigantine was driven onto rocks at Port Hutt (Whangaroa Harbour), Chatham Island, New Zealand. All hands were saved.
Margaret	United Kingdom	The brig was driven ashore and wrecked on the south coast of the Isle of Arran. She was on a voyage from Trinidad to Port Glasgow, Renfrewshire.
Mary Joan	United Kingdom	The ship was driven ashore at Crosby, Lancashire. She was on a voyage from Donegal to Liverpool, Lancashire.
Oratio (or Horatio)	United Kingdom	The brig was run down and sunk in the English Channel off The Lizard, Cornwall by HMS Birkenhead (Royal Navy). She was on a voyage from Enos, Ottoman Empire to Falmouth, Cornwall.
Wetmore	United Kingdom	The ship ran aground on the Burbo Bank, in Liverpool Bay. She was on a voyage from Saint Andrews, New Brunswick, British North America to Liverpool. She was refloated and towed in to Liverpool.

== 16 September ==
List of shipwrecks: 16 September 1847
Ship	State	Description
Apollo	United Kingdom	The ship foundered in the North Sea 60 nautical miles (110 km) north of Tynemouth, Northumberland. Five people were rescued by the brig Margaret and Sarah (United Kingdom). Apollo was on a voyage from Newcastle upon Tyne, Northumberland to Amsterdam, North Holland, Netherlands.
Ceres	United Kingdom	The schooner ran aground and was damaged on the Horse Bank, off Southport, Lancashire. She was on a voyage from Limerick to Preston, Lancashire.
Cornelia	Kingdom of Hanover	The ship was wrecked off Düne, Heligoland. Her crew were rescued. She was on a voyage from Hartlepool, County Durham, United Kingdom to Hamburg.
Cousins	United Kingdom	The ship foundered off Smith's Knowl, in the North Sea off the coast of Norfolk. Her crew were rescued by Saucy Jack (United Kingdom). Cousins was on a voyage from South Shields, County Durham to London.
Elizabeth	United Kingdom	The brig foundered in the Atlantic Ocean. Her crew were rescued by Peter and John (United Kingdom). Elizabeth was on a voyage from Malta to Cork.
Emma	United Kingdom	The ship was driven ashore and damaged at Shoreham-by-Sea, Sussex. She was refloated on 23 September and taken in to Shoreham-by-Sea.
Glenlyon	United Kingdom	The ship ran aground off Cape Janissary, in the Dardanelles. She was on a voyage from London to Constantinople, Ottoman Empire. She was refloated the next day.
Helen	United Kingdom	The ship was driven ashore and wrecked at Staithes, Yorkshire. Her crew were rescued. She was on a voyage from Newcastle upon Tyne to Great Yarmouth, Norfolk.
Henry Ewbank	United States	The barque was driven ashore at Bootle, Lancashire. She was on a voyage from New Orleans, Louisiana to Liverpool, Lancashire. She was refloated on 22 September.
Hillsborough	United Kingdom	The barque ran aground on the Horse Bank with the loss of eight of the thirteen people on board. She was on a voyage from Lytham St. Annes, Lancashire to Quebec City, Province of Canada, British North America. She had become a wreck by 24 September.
Horatio	United Kingdom	The ship, which had collided with a steamship off The Lizard, Cornwall on 15 September, was abandoned. Her crew were rescued by HMS Nautilus (Royal Navy). Horatioo was on a voyage from Enos, Ottoman Empire to Falmouth, Cornwall and Liverpool.
Industry	United Kingdom	The ship was driven ashore and sank near Larne, County Antrim. Her crew were rescued. She had been refloated by 30 September.
Jeanies	United Kingdom	The ship was driven ashore and severely damaged at Troon, Ayrshire. She was on a voyage from Belfast, County Antrim to Troon.
Lord Nelson	United Kingdom	The ship was driven ashore near Larne. Her crew were rescued.
Mary	United Kingdom	The brig was driven ashore in Ballyholme Bay. Her crew were rescued. She was on a voyage from the Clyde to Rio de Janeiro, Brazil. She was refloated on 21 September and towed in to Belfast for repairs.
Mary Jane	United Kingdom	The ship was driven ashore at Crosby Point, Lancashire. She was on a voyage from Donegal to Liverpool.
Mary Jane	United Kingdom	The ship was driven ashore at Belmullet, County Mayo, Her crew were rescued. She was on a voyage from Galway to Liverpool.
North Esk	United Kingdom	The brig was driven ashore and wrecked at Ennishowen Head, County Donegal. Her crew survived. She was on a voyage from the Clyde to Stettin.
Rebecca	(United Kingdom of Great Britain and Ireland) British North America	The schooner was driven ashore at Penrhyn Bay, Caernarfonshire. She was on a voyage from Nova Scotia, British North America to Liverpool. Rebecca was refloated on 24 September and taken in to Holyhead, Anglesey.
Wetmore	United Kingdom	The brig ran aground on the Burbo Bank, in Liverpool Bay. She was on a voyage from Saint Andrews, New Brunswick, British North America to Liverpool. She was refloated and taken in to Liverpool.

== 17 September ==
List of shipwrecks: 17 September 1847
Ship	State	Description
Britannia	United Kingdom	The ship foundered in the North Sea off Flamborough Head, Yorkshire. Her crew were rescued. She was on a voyage from Newcastle upon Tyne, Northumberland to London.
Brunette	United Kingdom	The schooner struck the Kentish Knock and foundered. Her crew survived. She was on a voyage from Marsala, Sicily to Hull, Yorkshire and Newcastle upon Tyne.
Emily	United Kingdom	The ship was driven ashore at Arnager, Denmark. She was on a voyage from Stettin to London. She had been refloated by 20 September and resumed her voyage.
Glyde	United Kingdom	The ship was beached at Penarth, Glamorgan.
Harmony	United Kingdom	The brig was driven ashore at Caernarfon. She was on a voyage from Belfast, County Antrim to Cardiff, Glamorgan. She was refloated with assistance from the Llanddwyn Lifeboat and taken in to Caernarfon.
Jan and Frederica	Netherlands	The ship ran aground off the Vlie with the loss of all hands. She was on a voyage from Saint Petersburg, Russia to Zwolle, Overijssel.
Kitty	United Kingdom	The sloop was driven ashore near Leasowe, Cheshire. Her crew were rescued. She was on a voyage from Liverpool, Lancashire to Chester, Cheshire.
Navigator	United Kingdom	The full-rigged ship was abandoned in the North Sea. Her crew were rescued by Jane Dunn (United Kingdom). Navigator was on a voyage from South Shields, County Durham to Hamburg.
Neptune	United Kingdom	The smack was driven ashore near Donaghmore.
Ninian	United Kingdom	The full-rigged ship ran aground and was wrecked at the entrance to Loch Foyle. All on board were rescued. She was on a voyage from Glasgow, Renfrewshire to Saint Stephen, New Brunswick, British North America.
Onyx	United Kingdom	The ship was driven ashore at Whitehaven, Cumberland. She was on a voyage from Liverpool to the Clyde.
Saone	United States	The barque was driven ashore at Caernarfon. Her crew were rescued by the Llandwyn Lifeboat, which lost two crew members. Saone was on a voyage from Galway, United Kingdom to Bangor, Caernarfonshire. She was refloated on 21 September and taken in to Caernarfon.
Sir Edward	United Kingdom	The schooner was driven ashore near Leasowe. Her crew were rescued. She was on a voyage from Liverpool to Mostyn, Flintshire.
St. Petersburg Packet	United Kingdom	The brig collided with the schooner Stranger (United Kingdom) and sank in the North Sea off the mouth of the Humber. Her crew were rescued by Stranger. St. Petersburg Packet was on a voyage from Stockton-on-Tees, County Durham to Great Yarmouth, Norfolk.
Unterneming	Prussia	The koff was wrecked near Schoorl, North Holland, Netherlands with the loss of three of her five crew.
William and Ann	United Kingdom	The ship was driven ashore at Whitstable, Kent. She was on a voyage from Llanelly, Glamorgan to London.

== 18 September ==
List of shipwrecks: 18 September 1847
Ship	State	Description
Coureren	Sweden	The ship capsized in the Baltic Sea. Her crew were rescued by a Norwegian vessel.
Eleonora	United Kingdom	The ship struck the Newcombe Sand and sank off Dover, Kent. She was on a voyage from Sunderland, County Durham to Bordeaux, Gironde, France.
Fanny	France	The whaler, a barque, was wrecked on the southern Point of Urup in the north west Pacific. Her crew were rescued by Inez (Flag unknown).
Forth	United Kingdom	The ship was driven ashore near Seerappen, Prussia. She was on a voyage from Hull, Yorkshire to Windau.
HMS Fisgard	Royal Navy	The Leda-class frigate ran aground off East Cowes, Isle of Wight. She was on a voyage from Rio de Janeiro, Brazil to Portsmouth, Hampshire. She was refloated.
Freund George	Netherlands	The sailing barge was driven ashore at Egmond aan Zee, North Holland. Her crew were rescued.
Renown	United Kingdom	The smack was damaged by fire at Liverpool, Lancashire.
Sally	United Kingdom	The ship was abandoned in the Atlantic Ocean. Her crew were rescued. She was on a voyage from Lisbon, Portugal to Cork.
Shannon	United Kingdom	The brig was wrecked near "Ording". Her crew were rescued. She was on a voyage from Hamburg to Sunderland, County Durham.
Starling	United Kingdom	The ship was abandoned in the North Sea. Her crew were rescued by Clara (Sweden). Starling was on a voyage from London to Newcastle upon Tyne, Northumberland.
Vine	United Kingdom	The ship was wrecked at Caernarfon with the loss of five lives. She was on a voyage from Pwllheli to Bangor, Caernarfonshire.

== 19 September ==
List of shipwrecks: 19 September 1847
Ship	State	Description
Aid	United Kingdom	The ship was driven ashore and wrecked near "Therup", Denmark. She was on a voyage from Glasgow, Renfrewshire to Stettin.
Augusta Matilda	United Kingdom	The ship foundered in the North Sea off Dimlington, Yorkshire. She was on a voyage from Hull, Yorkshire to Stettin.
Coatham	United Kingdom	The ship was driven ashore in Køge Bay. She was on a voyage from London to a Baltic port. She had been refloated by 30 September and towed in to Copenhagen, Denmark.
Emerald	United Kingdom	The ship was wrecked near Cape North, Nova Scotia, British North America. Her crew were rescued. She was on a voyage from Dartmouth, Devon to Quebec City, Province of Canada, British North America.
Gipsey	United Kingdom	The ship was driven ashore near Walmer Castle, Kent. She was on a voyage from Newcastle upon Tyne, Northumberland to Rouen, Seine-Inférieure, France. She was refloated but consequently sank in The Downs. Her crew were rescued.
Leo	United Kingdom	The ship was driven ashore and wrecked near Ingonish, Nova Scotia, British North America with the loss of a crew member. She was on a voyage from Liverpool, Lancashire to Quebec City, Province of Canada, British North America.
Lydie	France	The ship was abandoned off Helsingør, Denmark. Her fifteen crew were rescued by the schooner Breeze (United Kingdom and a Dutch vessel.
Magnifique	France	The ship was wrecked on the Shipwash Sand, in the North Sea off the coast of Essex, United Kingdom. Her crew were rescued. She was on a voyage from Seaham County Durham, United Kingdom to Bordeaux, Gironde.
Maid of Cashmere	(United Kingdom of Great Britain and Ireland) New South Wales	The schooner was wrecked south of "Port Aikenon". All on board were rescued. She was on a voyage from Launceston, Van Diemen's Land to Sydney.
Mentor	Kingdom of Hanover	The ship was lost off Utsire, Norway. She was on a voyage from Bergen, Norway to Rotterdam, South Holland, Netherlands.

== 20 September ==
List of shipwrecks: September 1847
Ship	State	Description
Barnard Castle Packet	United Kingdom	The brig, master John Finlay, ran aground and was severely damaged on a reef off "Seivästö", Grand Duchy of Finland on voyage from Stettin to St. Petersburg. Crew was saved.
Crest	United Kingdom	The ship foundered in the North Sea. Her crew were rescued by Maria (Flag unknown).
Dart	United Kingdom	The ship was abandoned in the North Sea. Her crew were rescued by Endeavour (United Kingdom). Dart was on a voyage from Hartlepool, County Durham to London.
Eliza Ann	(United Kingdom of Great Britain and Ireland) New South Wales	The schooner was lost in Broken Bay. She was on a voyage from Sydney to the Richmond River.
George and William	United Kingdom	The lugger sank in the North Sea off Cromer with the loss of nine of her ten crew. The survivor was rescued by the schooner Lowca (United Kingdom).
Grecian	United Kingdom	The ship was driven ashore in the Sound of Pladda. She was refloated and towed in to the Clyde by Defiance (United Kingdom).
Iris	United Kingdom	The ship ran aground in the River Mersey. She was on a voyage from Dublin to Liverpool, Lancashire.
Jabez	United Kingdom	The ship was driven ashore at Bawdsey, Suffolk. She was on a voyage from Boston, Lincolnshire to London. She was refloated the next day.
Marie	Prussia	The ship was wrecked off Anholt, Denmark. Her crew were rescued.
Martha Brae	(United Kingdom of Great Britain and Ireland) British North America	The ship was driven ashore at Barrington, Nova Scotia. She was on a voyage from Saint John, New Brunswick to Halifax, Nova Scotia.
Mary Jane	United Kingdom	The barque capsized at Quebec City, Province of Canada, British North America. She had been righted by 12 October.

== 21 September ==
List of shipwrecks: 21 September 1847
Ship	State	Description
Aurore	Russia	The ship collided with Marian ( Trieste) and sank in the Strait of Gibraltar. Her crew were rescued by Marian.
Express	United Kingdom	The sloop ran aground on the Vogelsand, in the North Sea. She was refloated the next day and taken in to Cuxhaven.
Industrie	Flag unknown	The ship ran aground on the Swine Bottoms. She was refloated with assistance from the steamship Hertha (Denmark) and resumed her voyage.

== 22 September ==
List of shipwrecks: 22 September 1847
Ship	State	Description
Emanuel	Sweden	The ship was driven ashore near "Wystad". She was on a voyage from Kalmar to Flensburg, Kingdom of Hanover.
Glenarm	United Kingdom	The ship was driven ashore and wrecked near Castello Branco, Faial Island, Azores. Her crew were rescued. She was on a voyage from Montevideo, Uruguay to Liverpool, Lancashire.
Minalto	United Kingdom	The ship was driven ashore on "Al Kuriat Island". She was on a voyage from Galaţi, Ottoman Empire to Cork. She was refloated and put in to Malta, where she arrived on 13 October.
Neptunus	United Kingdom	The ship ran aground and sank off Prince Edward Island, British North America. Her crew were rescued. She was on a voyage from Liverpool, Lancashire to Saint John, New Brunswick, British North America.
Noestra	Spain	The ship was wrecked on the Gunfleet Sand, in the North Sea off the coast of Essex, United Kingdom. Her crew were rescued. She was on a voyage from Lerwick, Shetland Islands, United Kingdom to Santander.

== 23 September ==
List of shipwrecks: 23 September 1847
Ship	State	Description
Camilla	(United Kingdom of Great Britain and Ireland) British North America	The brig ran aground on Nyord, Denmark. She was on a voyage from Saint Petersburg, Russia to London. She had been refloated by 25 September and resumed her voyage.
Elizabeth	(United Kingdom of Great Britain and Ireland) British North America	The ship was lost near L'Ardoise, Nova Scotia.
Fame	United Kingdom	The ship was in collision with Shannon (United Kingdom) and ran aground on the Busch Sand. She was refloated and put back to Cuxhaven.
Hope	United Kingdom	The Belfast-registered ship was driven ashore on Flotta, Orkney Islands. She had been refloated by 1 October.
Hope	United Kingdom	The Maryport-registered ship was driven ashore on Flotta. She had been refloated by 1 October.
Reliance	United Kingdom	The ship was driven ashore at Banff, Aberdeenshire. She was later refloated and taken in to Banff.
Scotsman	United Kingdom	The ship ran aground of Helsingør, Denmark. She was on a voyage from Saint Petersburg to Leith, Lothian. She was refloated on 26 September and resumed her voyage.
Tarbert Castle	United Kingdom	The barque ran aground on Nyord. She was on a voyage from Saint Petersburg to Arbroath, Forfarshire. She had been refloated by 25 September and resumed her voyage.

== 24 September ==
List of shipwrecks: 24 September 1847
Ship	State	Description
Louisa Williard	(United Kingdom of Great Britain and Ireland) British North America	The schooner was driven ashore at Ipswich, Massachusetts. Her crew were rescued. She was on a voyage from Saint John, New Brunswick to Boston, Massachusetts.
Scotsman	United Kingdom	The ship ran aground off Helsingør, Denmark. She was on a voyage from Saint Petersburg, Russia to Leith, Lothian. She was refloated on 26 September and resumed her voyage.

== 25 September ==
List of shipwrecks: 25 September 1847
Ship	State	Description
Auburn	United States	The packet ship was driven ashore and wrecked 10 nautical miles (19 km) south of the Barnegat Lighthouse, New Jersey with the loss of eighteen lives. She was on a voyage from New York to New Orleans, Louisiana.
Cherub	United Kingdom	The ship ran aground on the Barber Sand, in the North Sea off the coast of Norfolk. She was refloated and resumed her voyage.
Claudine	United Kingdom	The ship ran aground and was wrecked off Erris, County Mayo. She was on a voyage from Trinidad to Greenock, Renfrewshire.
HMS Comus	Royal Navy	The Comet-class sloop was driven ashore and sank near Montevideo, Uruguay. Subsequently refloated, repaired and returned to service.
Eleonora	United Kingdom	The ship ran aground on the Skagen Reef, off the coast of Denmark. Her crew were rescued. She was on a voyage from Riga, Russia to Liverpool, Lancashire.
Friendship	Danzig	The ship was abandoned in the White Sea and foundered. Her crew were rescued by Constant (United Kingdom). Friendship was on a voyage from Arkhangelsk, Russia to Rotterdam, South Holland, Netherlands.
Seaweed	United Kingdom	The collier sank in the River Severn.
Victoria	United Kingdom	The ship ran aground on the Barber Sand. She was refloated and resumed her voyage.

== 26 September ==
List of shipwrecks: 26 September 1847
Ship	State	Description
Earl of Durham	United Kingdom	The ship was wrecked on the Gunfleet Sand, in the North Sea off the coast of Essex. Her crew were rescued. She was on a voyage from Sunderland, County Durham to London. Earl of Durham was refloated but consequently had to be beached.
Industry	United Kingdom	The ship ran aground on the Goodwin Sands, Kent. She was on a voyage from Saint Petersburg, Russia to London. She was refloated but was consequently beached on the Sandwich Flats.
Louisa Willard	United Kingdom	The schooner was driven ashore at Ipswich, Massachusetts, United States. Her crew were rescued. She was on a voyage from Saint John, New Brunswick, British North America to Boston, Massachusetts.
Rob Roy	United Kingdom	The ship ran aground off Magnusholm, Russia. She was on a voyage from Hull, Yorkshire to Riga. She was refloated and taken in to Riga.
Michael Williams	United Kingdom	The brig, which had caught fire on 21 September, was abandoned in the South Atlantic. She was on a voyage from Aberdeen to Coquimbo, Chile.
Sine Normine	Netherlands	The ship ran aground at South Shields, County Durham, United Kingdom. She was on a voyage from South Shields to Vlissingen, Zeeland. She was refloated and put back to South Shields.

== 27 September ==
List of shipwrecks: 27 September 1847
Ship	State	Description
Dorado	(United Kingdom of Great Britain and Ireland) British North America	The ship was wrecked at Black Brook, Nova Scotia. Her crew were rescued. She was on a voyage from Pictou, Nova Scotia to Liverpool, Lancashire.
Elfrida	United Kingdom	The ship was beached at Stromness, Orkney Islands.
Emelie, or Emmeline	Danzig	The ship was driven ashore and wrecked on Bornholm, Denmark. Her crew were rescued. She was on a voyage from Danzig to Grimsby, Lincolnshire, United Kingdom.
Sceptre	United Kingdom	The ship was beached at Stromness.

== 28 September ==
List of shipwrecks: 28 September 1847
Ship	State	Description
Bransty	United Kingdom	The ship collided with Valhalla (United States) and was abandoned in the Irish Sea off the coast of Anglesey with the loss of a crew member. Bransty was on a voyage from Cardiff, Glamorgan to Liverpool, Lancashire, She was subsequently towed in to Drogheda, County Louth.
General Taylor	United States	The brig was driven ashore on Tuckernuck Island, Massachusetts.
Peter and Sophie	Duchy of Holstein	The ship was wrecked on Skagen, Denmark. She was on a voyage from Antwerp, Belgium to Tønning.
Soundraporvy	United Kingdom	The ship ran aground off Penarth, Glamorgan. She was on a voyage from Cardiff, Glamorgan to Constantinople, Ottoman Empire.

== 29 September ==
List of shipwrecks: 29 September 1847
Ship	State	Description
John and Rebecca	United Kingdom	The ship ran aground on the Newcombe Sand, in the North Sea off the coast of Suffolk. She was on a voyage from Newcastle upon Tyne, Northumberland to Rouen, Seine-Inférieure, France. She was refloated but ran aground on the Pakefield Flats and sank. She was again refloated and towed in to Lowestoft by the tug Pursuit (United Kingdom), but she sank again.
Margarets	United Kingdom	The ship struck a sunken rock off Fladda, Argyllshire and was holed. She was beached in Loch Valamis. She was on a voyage from Riga, Russia to Glasgow, Renfrewshire.
Marie Vincente	France	The ship was driven ashore at Pembrey, Pembrokeshire, United Kingdom. She was on a voyage from Sarzeau, Morbihan to Neath, Glamorgan, United Kingdom. Marie Vincente was refloated on 9 October.
Mary Alice	United Kingdom	The ship collided with Minerva (United Kingdom) and was beached in the River Lee. She was on a voyage from Enos, Ottoman Empire to Cork.
Nostra Señora del Carmen	Spain	The ship was wrecked on the Gunfleet Sand, in the North Seaoff the coast of Essex, United Kingdom. Her crew were rescued. She was on a voyage from Lerwick, Shetland Islands, United Kingdom to Santander.
St Nicolo	Russia	The ship sank at Taganrog.
Voyageur de St. Carnac	France	The ship was driven ashore at Penzance, Cornwall, United Kingdom. She was on a voyage from Cardiff, Glamorgan to Morlaix, Finistère.
Wansbeck	United Kingdom	The ship ran aground off Helsingør, Denmark.

== 30 September ==
List of shipwrecks: 30 September 1847
Ship	State	Description
Betsey	United Kingdom	The ship struck a sunken rock and foundered in the North Sea off the coast of Northumberland. her crew were rescued. She was on a voyage from Warkworth, Northumberland to Dundee, Forfarshire.
Charles	United Kingdom	The ship was driven ashore at Castrup, Denmark. She was on a voyage from Saint Petersburg, Russia to Sunderland, County Durham. She was refloated on 2 October and resumed her voyage.
Expedition	United Kingdom	The ship sprang a leak and sank in Bude Bay. Her crew were rescued. She was on a voyage from Poole, Dorset to Gloucester.
George and Heinrich	Stralsund	The ship was driven ashore on Bornholm, Denmark. She was on a voyage from Gothenburg, Sweden to Stralsund.
Hope	United Kingdom	The ship foundered in the Bristol Channel off the coast of Pembrokeshire with the loss of all hands.
Johanne	Netherlands	The ship was driven ashore on Bornholm. She was on a voyage from Danzig to Amsterdam, North Holland.
Margaret	United Kingdom	The ship was abandoned in the Atlantic Ocean (50°00′N 7°30′W). Her crew were rescued. she was on a voyage from Cardiff, Glamorgan to Syra, Greece.
Priam	United Kingdom	The ship was abandoned off Dagerort, Russia. Her crew were rescued by Kleine Karl (Norway). Priam was on a voyage from Liverpool, Lancashire to Saint Petersburg.

== Unknown date ==
List of shipwrecks: unknown date in September 1847
Ship	State	Description
Adolphine	Wismar	The brig ran aground on the Gunfleet Sand, in the North Sea off the coast of Essex, United Kingdom. She was refloated but was subsequently wrecked on the Whittaker Sand whilst making for Harwich, Essex. Her crew were rescued.
Alfred	United Kingdom	The ship was abandoned in the Atlantic Ocean before 27 September.
Alpha	(United Kingdom of Great Britain and Ireland) South Australia	The schooner was wrecked in Encounter Bay before 4 September. Her crew were rescued.
Betty	United Kingdom	The schooner was wrecked on the Cork Sand, in the North Sea off the coast of Suffolk. Her crew were rescued. She was on a voyage from Portmadoc, Caernarfonshire to Woodbridge, Suffolk.
Charles	Netherlands	The full-rigged ship was abandoned in the Atlantic Ocean before 9 September.
Declaration	United States	The ship was abandoned in the Atlantic Ocean before 12 September. She was on a voyage from New York to Barbados. She was subsequently boarded by the crew of a British vessel which intended to take her in to Halifax, Nova Scotia, British North America.
Foster	United States	The barque was abandoned in the Seychelles before 9 September. Her crew were rescued.
Henry Pratt	United States	The ship ran aground on the Codling Bank, in the Irish Sea. She was on a voyage from Liverpool, Lancashire, United Kingdom to Mobile, Alabama. She was refloated and resumed her voyage.
Ingria	Russia	The brig was driven ashore in the Danube upstream of Reni. She was refloated.
Jeune Adele	United Kingdom	The ship was wrecked at Boulogne, Pas-de-Calais before 22 September.
Lively	United Kingdom	The ship was driven ashore at Fraserburgh, Aberdeenshire. She was refloated on 10 September and taken in to Fraserburgh.
Marchioness of Huntley	United Kingdom	The ship foundered in Melvich Bay. Her crew survived. She was on a voyage from Liverpool, Lancashire to Portskerra, Sutherland.
Margaret and Ann	United Kingdom	The smack was driven ashore at "Port Mure", Isle of Man. She was refloated on 22 September and taken in to Douglas.
Mezeppa	United Kingdom	The ship ran aground off Free Island before 16 September. She was on a voyage from Mauritius to Singapore. She was refloated and completed her voyage.
Naiad	United Kingdom	The schooner was abandoned in the Atlantic Ocean before 16 October.
Napoleon	France	The ship was abandoned in the Atlantic Ocean before 16 September.
Samuel Baker	United Kingdom	The ship was driven ashore on Piana Island, off Cape Farina, Beylik of Tunis between 6 and 18 September. She was on a voyage from Malta to Cork or Falmouth, Cornwall. She was refloated and put back to Malta.
Sarah Jane	(United Kingdom of Great Britain and Ireland) New Zealand	The schooner was wrecked near Castlepoint, New Zealand, in mid-September, after being pushed off course by a storm in Cook Strait, while she was en route from Wellington to Kaikōura. There were no deaths. All hands were saved.
Saucy Jack	United Kingdom	The schooner was abandoned in the Seychelles before 9 September. Her crew were rescued.
Skylark	United Kingdom	The ship was driven ashore at Widewall, Orkney Islands.
St. Nicola	Greece	The brig was lost at Sulina, Ottoman Empire before 4 September. She was on a voyage from Ibrail, Ottoman Empire to Malta.
William and Hannah	United Kingdom	The ship was driven ashore at Whitstable, Kent. She was on a voyage from Llanelly, Glamorgan to London. She was refloated on 19 September and taken in to The Swale.
