= List of shipwrecks in March 1846 =

The list of shipwrecks in March 1846 includes ships sunk, foundered, wrecked, grounded, or otherwise lost during March 1846.

== 1 March ==
List of shipwrecks: 1 March 1846
Ship	State	Description
Fairy	United Kingdom	The schooner was driven ashore at Marsden, County Durham. She was on a voyage from South Shields, County Durham to Rouen, Seine-Inférieure, France. She was refloated the next day and put back to South Shields.
Favorite	United Kingdom	The ship was driven ashore near Dunwich, Suffolk. She was on a voyage from Newcastle upon Tyne, Northumberland to Almería, Spain. She was refloated and resumed her voyage.
Kate Kearney	United Kingdom	The ship ran aground at Cork. She was on a voyage from Jamaica to Cork.

== 2 March ==
List of shipwrecks: 2 March 1846
Ship	State	Description
Fin	United Kingdom	The ship ran aground in the River Dee. She was on a voyage from Kirkcudbright to Liverpool, Lancashire. She was later refloated, and resumed her voyage on 9 March.
Teazer	United Kingdom	The ship was severely damaged at Limerick. She was on a voyage from Limerick to Liverpool, Lancashire.
Victoria	United Kingdom	The ship was driven ashore and wrecked at Porthcawl, Glamorgan. Her crew were rescued. She was on a voyage from Bristol, Gloucestershire to Porthcawl.

== 3 March ==
List of shipwrecks: 3 March 1846
Ship	State	Description
Alice	United Kingdom	The ship was wrecked at Donoughmore, County Cork with the loss of a crew member. She was on a voyage from Saint Domingo to Cork.
Bravo	United Kingdom	The ship ran aground on the Riding Rocks, off the coast of the Bahamas. She was on a voyage from Belize City, British Honduras to Cork. She was refloated and taken in to Nassau, Bahamas for repairs.
Quatre Sœurs	France	The ship foundered off Agde, Hérault.

== 4 March ==
List of shipwrecks: March 1846
Ship	State	Description
Adventure	United Kingdom	The ship ran aground on the Cutler Sand, in the North Sea off the coast of Essex. She was on a voyage from Newcastle upon Tyne, Northumberland to London. She was refloated and taken in to Harwich, Essex in a leaky condition.
Caledonia	United Kingdom	The sloop was driven ashore at Ballyhenry, County Antrim.
Ceylon	United Kingdom	The ship was abandoned in the Atlantic Ocean. Her crew were rescued by the brig Vestal (Portugal). Ceylon was on a voyage from Newport, Monmouthshire to New York, United States.
Charlotte	United Kingdom	The ship was driven ashore in the River Liffey. She was on a voyage from Liverpool, Lancashire to Livorno, Grand Duchy of Tuscany. She was refloated on 12 March.
Fenelon	Belgium	The ship ran aground in the Scheldt at Fort Frederi Henri. She was on a voyage from Rio de Janeiro, Brazil to Antwerp. She was refloated the next day and taken in to Antwerp.
Five Sisters	United Kingdom	The ship was driven ashore on the north west coast of Bermuda. She was refloated and taken in to Somerset, Bermuda for repairs.
Hero	United Kingdom	The ship was driven ashore at Carrickfergus, County Antrim.
Jane	United Kingdom	The ship was driven ashore at Carrickfergus.
Leadbitter	United Kingdom	The ship ran aground on the Holm Sand, in the North Sea off the coast of Norfolk. She was on a voyage from Newcastle upon Tyne to Rochefort, Charente-Maritime. She was refloated and taken in to Great Yarmouth in a leaky condition.
Leda	United Kingdom	The ship was driven ashore at Kilrush, County Clare. She was refloated the next day.
Lord Anson	(United Kingdom of Great Britain and Ireland) Jersey	The ship was wrecked on the Tobasco Bank. Her crew were rescued.
Maria	United Kingdom	The smack was driven ashore at Coultersoy, Islay, Inner Hebrides.
Mary	United Kingdom	The ship was driven ashore at Carrickfergus.
Mary Stewart	United Kingdom	The ship was driven ashore and severely damaged at Belfast, County Antrim. She was on a voyage from Mauritius to Belfast. she was refloated.
Narcissus	United Kingdom	The ship was driven ashore and damaged at the Mumbles, Glamorgan. She was refloated and taken in to Swansea, Glamorgan in a leaky condition.
Odin	United Kingdom	The ship ran aground on the Smithir Sand, in the North Sea. She was refloated and taken in to ScarboroughYorkshire in a leaky condition.
Princess	United Kingdom	The ship was driven ashore and sank at the Mumbles. Her crew were rescued. She was on a voyage from Cardiff, Glamorgan to London.
Vestal	United Kingdom	The brig was lost near Viana do Castelo, Portugal with the loss of six or eight of her sixteen crew. She was on a voyage from Demerara, British Guiana to the Clyde.
William	United Kingdom	The schooner was driven ashore at Ballyhenry. She was refloated on 6 March.

== 5 March ==
List of shipwrecks: 5 March 1846
Ship	State	Description
James Crawford	(United Kingdom of Great Britain and Ireland) Isle of Man	The ship foundered off the Mull of Galloway, Argyllshire with the loss of all hands. She was on a voyage from Liverpool, Lancashire to Portrush, County Antrim.

== 6 March ==
List of shipwrecks: 6 March 1846
Ship	State	Description
Margaret	(United Kingdom of Great Britain and Ireland) Grenada	The sloop was wrecked on the North Reef, off Grenada.
Trio	United Kingdom	The barque was wrecked on Rodrigues. All on board were rescued. She was on a voyage from Calcutta, India to Mauritius.

== 7 March ==
List of shipwrecks: 7 March 1846
Ship	State	Description
Coromandel	United Kingdom	The schooner was wrecked on the West Hoyle Bank, in Liverpool Bay. Her crew were rescued.
Derwent	United Kingdom	The schooner ran aground at Cullercoats, Northumberland. She was refloated and taken in to Cullercoats.

== 8 March ==
List of shipwrecks: 8 March 1846
Ship	State	Description
Juno	United Kingdom	The brig was wrecked in ice in the Atlantic Ocean. Her twelve crew took to the boat but only five of them survived to be rescued by Goodwin (United Kingdom) on 1 April. Juno was on a voyage from Greenock, Renfrewshire to Saint John's, Newfoundland, British North America.
Metcalf	United Kingdom	The sloop was driven ashore at Blakeney, Norfolk. She was on a voyage from Woodbridge, Suffolk to Spalding, Lincolnshire. She was refloated the next day.
Peruvian	United Kingdom	The barque was wrecked on the Horse Shoe Reef, part of the Great Barrier Reef off Port Denison, Queensland. She was on a voyage from Sydney, New South Wales to China. Only one of the 21 people on board ultimately survived.
William and James	United Kingdom	The ship sprang a leak and sank off Troon, Ayrshire. Her crew were rescued.

== 10 March ==
List of shipwrecks: 10 March 1846
Ship	State	Description
Oberon	United Kingdom	The barque foundered in the Atlantic Ocean (55°30′N 18°00′W). Her crew survived. She was on a voyage from King's Lynn, Norfolk to Saint John, New Brunswick, British North America.
Rienzi	Denmark	The ship was wrecked on Green Island, British North America. She was on a voyage from Frederiksberg to Halifax, Nova Scotia, British North America.

== 11 March ==
List of shipwrecks: 11 March 1846
Ship	State	Description
Alhambra	United Kingdom	The full-rigged ship was wrecked at Rhoscolyn, Anglesey. Her 23 crew were rescued by the lifeboat № 3 (United Kingdom).
Flora	United Kingdom	The ship was driven ashore near Málaga, Spain. She was on a voyage from Livorno, Grand Duchy of Tuscany to Liverpool, Lancashire. She was refloated on 9 April and taken in to Málaga for repairs.
Frankland	United Kingdom	The full-rigged ship was wrecked at Cemaes, Anglesey. Her twenty crew were rescued by a lifeboat.
Langonaise	France	The schooner was wrecked near Point St. Matthew, Finistère with the loss of all hands. She was on a voyage from Bordeaux, Gironde to Abbeville, Somme.
HMS Osprey	Royal Navy	The brig was wrecked at False Hokianga, New Zealand. Her crew were rescued.
Rachel and Mary	United Kingdom	The schooner was wrecked at Porto, Portugal. Her crew survived. She was on a voyage from Dundee, Forfarshire to Porto.
Rochester	United Kingdom	The brig was wrecked at Porto. Her crew survived. She was on a voyage from the Firth of Forth to Porto.

== 12 March ==
List of shipwrecks: 12 March 1846
Ship	State	Description
Belle	United Kingdom	The schooner was driven ashore at the Southerness Lighthouse, Kirkcudbrightshire. She was on a voyage from Newport, Monmouthshire to Ardrossan, Ayrshire. She was refloated the next day and put in to Carsethorn.
Ernst Lorentz	Hamburg	The ship caught fire in the Netherlands Antilles. She put in to Saint Thomas, Virgin Islands where she was scuttled. She was on a voyage from Hamburg to Veracruz, Mexico. She was refloated on 16 March.
Larch	United Kingdom	The ship ran aground and was severely in the River Avon. She was on a voyage from Saint John, New Brunswick to Bristol, Gloucestershire. She was refloated and taken in to Bristol.
Sarah	United Kingdom	The ship ran aground and was severely damaged in the River Avon. She was on a voyage from Saint John to Liverpool, Lancashire. She was refloated.

== 13 March ==
List of shipwrecks: 13 March 1846
Ship	State	Description
St. Cloud	United States	The ship was abandoned in the Atlantic Ocean. Her crew were rescued by Lochinvar (United Kingdom). St. Cloud was on a voyage from Liverpool, Lancashire, United Kingdom to Charleston, South Carolina.
Watchword	United Kingdom	The schooner was wrecked at Cabo de Santa Maria, Portugal. Her crew were rescued. She was on a voyage from Trieste to Falmouth, Cornwall.

== 14 March ==
List of shipwrecks: 14 March 1846
Ship	State	Description
Agenoria	United Kingdom	The ship was driven ashore at Knockadoon Head, County Cork.
Britannia, and Gironde	United Kingdom	The brigs were in collision and sank in the North Sea off the coast of Yorkshire. Both crews were rescued.
Earl of Eglington	United Kingdom	The ship was wrecked on the south coast of Nantucket, Massachusetts, United States with the loss of six of her crew. She was on a voyage from Liverpool, Lancashire to Boston, Massachusetts, United States.
Elizabeth Hunter	United Kingdom	The brig was wrecked on the Anholt Reef, off the coast of Denmark. Her eight crew were rescued. She was on a voyage from Sunderland, County Durham to Memel, Prussia.
Kentville	United Kingdom	The ship was lost "on Tobasco". Her crew were rescued.
Reward	(United Kingdom of Great Britain and Ireland) British North America	The ship was wrecked on Cape Sable Island, Nova Scotia. Her crew survived. She was on a voyage from Saint John's, Newfoundland to Halifax, Nova Scotia.
Three Sisters	United Kingdom	The ship struck rocks and sank in Vaila Sound, Shetland Islands.

== 15 March ==
List of shipwrecks: 15 March 1846
Ship	State	Description
Feroco	Austrian Empire	The ship was wrecked on a reef off Syra, Greece. She was on a voyage from London, United Kingdom to Syra and Constantinople, Ottoman Empire.
Herschel	United States	The barque ran aground and was damaged in the Mississippi River. She was refloated and put under repair.
Lime Cobb	United Kingdom	The ship was driven ashore north of Harrington, Cumberland. She was on a voyage from Larne, County Antrim to Harrington.
Virginia	United States	The brig ran aground in the Mississippi River. She was refloated and put under repair.

== 16 March ==
List of shipwrecks: 16 March 1846
Ship	State	Description
Admiral	United Kingdom	The brig was wrecked at Portskerra, Sutherland with the loss of all 21 people on board. She was on a voyage from Sunderland, County Durham to Sligo.
Anna	United Kingdom	The sloop was driven ashore and wrecked near Thurso, Caithness with the loss of three of her four crew. She was on a voyage from Ballachulish, Inverness-shire to Arbroath, Forfarshire.
Belfast	United Kingdom	The barque was wrecked near Armadale, Sutherland with the loss of ten of the sixteen people on board. She was on a voyage from Leith, Lothian to Montevideo, Uruguay.
Diana	United Kingdom	The sloop was driven ashore at Scrabster, Caithness with the loss of three of her crew.
Elizabeth	United Kingdom	The ship issued a message in a bottle stating she was in distress off the Bell Rock and being driven northward. She was on a voyage from Liverpool, Lancashire to Newcastle upon Tyne, Northumberland.
Gulielmus	France	The ship ran aground at Shoreham-by-Sea, Sussex, United Kingdom. She was on a voyage from Caen, Calvados to Shoreham-by-Sea.
Isabella	United Kingdom	The ship caught fire and was run ashore at Helmsdale, Sutherland. Her crew were rescued. She was refloated and completed her voyage.
Moreland	United Kingdom	The barque was in collision with Espindola (United Kingdom) and was abandoned the next day. Her crew were rescued by Espindola. Moreland was on a voyage from the Salt River, Jamaica to London. Date also reported as 16 April.
Northumberland	United Kingdom	The brig was driven ashore in Sandwick Bay, Caithness. Her thirteen crew were rescued. She was on a voyage from South Shields to Saint John's, Newfoundland, British North America.
Prosperous	United Kingdom	The sloop was driven ashore and wrecked at Scrabster. Her crew survived. She was on a voyage from Stornoway, Isle of Lewis, Outer Hebrides to Banff.
Richard	United Kingdom	The brig ran aground on the Race Patch Sand, off the coast of Kent and sank. Her crew were rescued. She was on a voyage from Liverpool, Lancashire to London.
Stirling	United Kingdom	The ship was driven ashore 10 nautical miles (19 km) east of Cape Wrath, Caithness. Her crew were rescued. She was on a voyage from Leith, Lothian to an Irish port.

== 17 March ==
List of shipwrecks: 17 March 1846
Ship	State	Description
Belfast	United Kingdom	The ship was driven ashore at Thurso, Caithness with the loss of nine of her crew.
Columbus	United States	The ship was driven ashore at New York. She was on a voyage from New York to London, United Kingdom. Columbus was refloated on 21 March.
James and Mary	United Kingdom	The ship was driven ashore and severely damaged at Rosehearty, Aberdeenshire. Her crew were rescued. She was on a voyage from Peterhead, Aberdeenshire to Antwerp, Belgium.
Lark	United Kingdom	The paddle tug sank at the mouth of the River Tyne. Her crew were rescued.
Midge	United Kingdom	The ship was wrecked at Burghead, Moray. Her crew were rescued. She was on a voyage from Newcastle upon Tyne, Northumberland to Ballantrae, Ayrshire.
Nehant	United States	The barque was driven ashore and wrecked at Berry Head, Devon, United Kingdom. She was on a voyage from Ghent, East Flanders, Belgium to Galveston, Texas All 160 people on board were rescued. She was refloated on 12 April and taken in to Torquay, Devon for breaking.
Northern Maid	United Kingdom	The ship was driven ashore at Fraserburgh, Aberdeenshire.
Pedlar	United Kingdom	The ship was abandoned in the North Sea off the coast of County Durham with the loss of two of her four crew. Survivors were rescued by Mansfield (United Kingdom). Pedlar was on a voyage from Grangemouth, Stirlingshire to Saint-Valery-sur-Somme, France.
Tordenskjold	Norway	The ship was wrecked between Aalesund and Christiansand, Norway. Her crew were rescued. She was on a voyage from Tromsø to Amsterdam, North Holland, Netherlands.
York	United Kingdom	The ship ran aground on the Long Key. She was on a voyage from New Orleans, Louisiana, United States to Liverpool, Lancashire. She was refloated on 19 March and taken in to Key West, Florida, United States.

== 18 March ==
List of shipwrecks: 18 March 1846
Ship	State	Description
Ann and Ellen	United Kingdom	The ship collided with Regent and sank in the Swin, off the coast of Essex. Her crew were rescued by Regent. Ann and Ellen was on a voyage from Montrose, Forfarshire to London.
Elizabeth	United Kingdom	The ship ran aground on the Goodwin Sands, Kent. She was on a voyage from Hartlepool, County Durham to Shoreham-by-Sea, Sussex. She was refloated and resumed her voyage.
Good Hope	United Kingdom	The ship was driven ashore and wrecked near Cochin, India. She was on a voyage from Bombay, India to Liverpool, Lancashire.
Magnet	United Kingdom	The ship foundered. Her crew were rescued. She was on a voyage from Hartlepool, County Durham to Swinemünde, Prussia.
Ternate	Netherlands	The ship ran aground on the Pampus. She was on a voyage from Batavia, Netherlands East Indies to Rotterdam, South Holland. She was refloated.
Udney	United Kingdom	The schooner ran aground and was beached at Sunderland, County Durham. She was on a voyage from Sunderland to Newburgh, Fife.

== 19 March ==
List of shipwrecks: 19 March 1846
Ship	State	Description
Albert	United Kingdom	The ship ran aground and was severely damaged at Livorno, Grand Duchy of Tuscany. She was on a voyage from Newcastle upon Tyne to Livorno. She was refloated and taken in to Livorno.
Jane	United Kingdom	The ship struck a rock and capsized at Saint-Malo, Ille-et-Vilaine, France. She was on a voyage from Saint-Malo to Jersey, Channel Islands. She was refloated the next day and taken in to Saint-Malo.
Mary Catherine	(United Kingdom of Great Britain and Ireland) New Zealand	The ship ran aground at Port Otago. She was refloated.
Niobe	United Kingdom	The ship was driven ashore 8 nautical miles (15 km) south of Bridlington, Yorkshire. Her crew were rescued. She was on a voyage from London to Sunderland, County Durham. She was refloated on 25 March and taken in to Bridlington for temporary repairs before being towed to Sunderland.
Prince George	(United Kingdom of Great Britain and Ireland) New South Wales	The cutter departed from Sydney of Hobart, Van Diemen's Land. Subsequently wrecked at Wollongong, South Australia. All on board survived.

== 20 March ==
List of shipwrecks: March 1846
Ship	State	Description
Admiral	United Kingdom	The ship was driven ashore and wrecked at Portskerra, Sutherland with the loss of all hands.
Ann	United Kingdom	The ship struck a sunken rock and was wrecked at Kirkcubbin, County Down. She was on a voyage from Newport, Monmouthshire to Londonderry.
Diana	United Kingdom	The ship was driven ashore at Scrabster, Caithness with the loss of three of her crew.
Elizabeth Holmes	United Kingdom	The ship struck rocks and sank off Groix, Morbihan, France. Her crew were rescued. She was on a voyage from Sunderland, County Durham to Paimbœuf, Loire-Inférieure, France.
Prosperous	United Kingdom	The ship was driven ashore at Scrabster. Her crew were rescued.

== 21 March ==
List of shipwrecks: 21 March 1846
Ship	State	Description
Aid	United Kingdom	The ship was driven onto rocks at South Den, Isle of Mull. She was refloated and beached at Tobermory. She was on a voyage from Liverpool, Lancashire to Dundee, Forfarshire. She resumed her voyage on 28 March.
Ally and Betty	United Kingdom	The ship was driven ashore at Donaghadee, County Antrim. All on board were rescued. She subsequently floated off and sank.
Alpha	United Kingdom	The ship ran aground at Maryport, Cumberland. She was on a voyage from Glasgow, Renfrewshire to Preston, Lancashire. She was refloated.
Bee	United Kingdom	The sloop foundered in the English Channel 3 miles (4.8 km) off Shoreham-by-Sea, Sussex with the loss of five of her six crew. The survivor was rescued by the Menai (United Kingdom). Bee was on a voyage from Portland, Dorset to London.
Britannia	United Kingdom	The ship was driven ashore at Ballyquinton Point, County Down. She was on a voyage from Troon, Ayrshire to Dublin. She was refloated on 25 March and taken in to Portaferry in a leaky condition.
Dove	United Kingdom	The ship foundered in Carmarthen Bay.
Duchess of Beaufort	United Kingdom	The schooner was wrecked on the Rose Sand, in the North Sea off the coast of Lincolnshire. Her crew were rescued by HMRC Ann ( Board of Customs). She was on a voyage from Cardiff, Glamorgan to Wisbech, Cambridgeshire. She was refloated on 26 March and taken in to Grimsby.
Elizabeth	United Kingdom	The schooner was driven ashore and sank at Winterton-on-Sea, Norfolk. She was refloated on 27 March and taken in to Great Yarmouth.
Jane and Grace	United Kingdom	The schooner was driven ashore in the Bay of Luce. She was on a voyage from Glasgow to Liverpool.
John	United Kingdom	The smack was driven ashore at Pwllheli, Caernarfonshire. She was on a voyage from Holyhead, Anglesey to Portmadoc, Caernarfonshire.
Joseph Cristall	United Kingdom	The ship ran aground in the Gulf of Smyrna off St. James Castle. She was on a voyage from Smyrna, Ottoman Empire to Liverpool. She was refloated and resumed her voyage.
Liverpool	United Kingdom	The ship was driven onto rocks at South Den. She was refloated and beached at Tobermory. She resumed her voyage on 28 March.
Mayflower	United Kingdom	The smack ran aground at Bridlington, Yorkshire and was wrecked.
Mountaineer	United Kingdom	The ship ran aground on the Kish Bank, in the Irish Sea. She was on a voyage from Demerara, British Guiana to Dublin. She was refloated and taken in to Holyhead, Anglesey in a sinking condition.
Murier	Hamburg	The ship ran aground at Cowes, Isle of Wight, United Kingdom. She was on a voyage from Cowes to Hamburg. She was refloated the next day.
Welcome	United Kingdom	The brig was driven ashore at South Shields, County Durham. Her crew were rescued. She was on a voyage from London to South Shields. Welcome was refloated on 27 March with assistance from the steamship Lee (United Kingdom).
Stirlinghill	United Kingdom	The ship, which had srang a leak the day before, was beached at Cape Wrath, Sutherland.
Welcome	United Kingdom	The smack was driven ashore at Great Yarmouth, Norfolk. She was refloated the next day and taken in to Great Yarmouth.

== 22 March ==
List of shipwrecks: 22 March 1846
Ship	State	Description
Colonel Taylor	United States	The brig was driven ashore 15 nautical miles (28 km) east of Málaga, Spain. She was refloated and taken in to Málaga for repairs.
Emanuel	Stettin	The ship was wrecked on Steven's Klint, off the coast of Denmark. She was on a voyage from Stettin to Rouen, Seine-Inférieure, France.
Emma	United Kingdom	The schooner was in collision with Quebec (United Kingdom) in the English Channel off South Foreland, Kent and was abandoned. She was on a voyage from Limerick to London. She subsequently came ashore near Deal, Kent. Emma was refloated and taken in to Ramsgate in a leaky condition.
James Haighs	United Kingdom	The ship was driven ashore and severely damaged at Redcar, Yorkshire. She was on a voyage from Wisbech, Cambridgeshire to Middlesbrough, Yorkshire. She was refloated and taken in to Middlesbrough.
Kronfrindsen	Sweden	The ship was wrecked at Rogefjord with the loss of all but one of her crew. She was on a voyage from Gothenburg to Hull, Yorkshire.
Richard and Ann	United Kingdom	The ship was driven ashore at Redcar. She was refloated and taken in to Middlesbrough.
Thetis	United Kingdom	The ship was driven ashore at Sunderland, County Durham. She was refloated on 24 March and taken in to Sunderland.
Tintern	United Kingdom	The steamship ran aground at Port Talbot, Glamorgan. She was on a voyage from Bristol, Gloucestershire to Port Talbot. She was refloated on 24 March.
Trine Elisabeth	Denmark	The yacht was abandoned in the North Sea. Her crew were rescued by Erstatinry (flag unknown).
Vrouw Margaretha	Netherlands	The ship was in collision with an English brig and sank in the North Sea. Her crew were rescued by Carl Johann (Netherlands). Vrow Margaretha was on a voyage from Delfzijl, South Holland to Brevik, Norway.

== 23 March ==
List of shipwrecks: 23 March 1846
Ship	State	Description
Catherine	United Kingdom	The ship was driven ashore on Drakes Island, Devon. She was on a voyage from Hartlepool to Rochefort, Charente-Maritime, France. She was refloated.
Chance	United Kingdom	The ship was wrecked at Fairlight, Sussex.
Farmer's Daughter	United Kingdom	The ship was driven ashore at Camber, Sussex.
Seven Brothers	United Kingdom	The sloop was driven ashore and wrecked on Skomer, Pembrokeshire with the loss of her captain. She was on a voyage from Llanelly, Glamorgan to Wexford.
Speculator	United Kingdom	The ship ran aground in the River Loughor and was wrecked. She was on a voyage from Burry Port, Glamorgan to "Whitford".
Thomas H. Perkins	United States	The ship ran aground at the mouth of the Mississippi River. Whilst aground, she was run into by Liverpool (United Kingdom). Thomas H. Perkins was on a voyage from New Orleans, Louisiana to Liverpool, Lancashire, United Kingdom.

== 24 March ==
List of shipwrecks: 24 March 1846
Ship	State	Description
Sir Henry Clay	United Kingdom	The full-rigged ship was driven ashore on Squan Beach, Manasquan, New Jersey, United States with the loss of six lives. Over 300 people were rescued. She was on a voyage from Liverpool, Lancashire to New York, United States. Sir Henry Clay was refloated on 14 April and towed in to New York.
Trois Frères	France	The ship was wrecked on Castle Island, Bermuda. Her crew were rescued. She was on a voyage from the Rio de la Hacha to Havre de Grâce, Seine-Inférieure.

== 25 March ==
List of shipwrecks: 25 March 1846
Ship	State	Description
Blackaller	United Kingdom	The brig was wrecked in Algoa Bay.
Carrara	United Kingdom	The barque was driven ashore and wrecked at Rattray Head, Aberdeenshire. Her crew were rescued. She was on a voyage from Newcastle upon Tyne, Northumberland to Genoa, Kingdom of Sardinia. She was refloated on 14 May and taken in to Peterhead, Aberdeenshire, from where she was towed to Aberdeen.
Flora	United Kingdom	The ship was driven ashore 4 nautical miles (7.4 km) east of Málaga, Spain. She was on a voyage from Livorno, Grand Duchy of Tuscany to Liverpool, Lancashire. She was refloated the next day.
Jim Crow	United Kingdom	The schooner was wrecked in Algoa Bay.
Lerwick	United Kingdom	The ship was driven ashore at Wexford. She was on a voyage from Wexford to Glasgow, Renfrewshire. She was refloated on 27 March and taken in to Wexford.
Marys	(United Kingdom of Great Britain and Ireland) New South Wales	The schooner ran aground between Point Cook and the Heads.
Susan	United Kingdom	The barque was wrecked in Algoa Bay.

== 26 March ==
List of shipwrecks: 26 March 1846
Ship	State	Description
Atalanta	United States	The ship was abandoned in the Atlantic Ocean having sprang a leak on 22 March. Her crew were rescued by Young Hero (United States).
Conqueror	United Kingdom	The paddle tug struck the Swelly Rocks in the Menai Strait, and sank. Her crew were rescued. She was on a voyage from Liverpool, Lancashire to Dublin. She was refloated the next day, repaired and resumed her voyage.
Francis	(United Kingdom of Great Britain and Ireland) British North America	The schooner ran aground on the Alligator Reef. She was on a voyage from Jamaica to New York, United States. She was refloated on 28 March and towed in to Key West, Florida, United States for repairs.
George and Alexander	United Kingdom	The ship was holed by an anchor and sank at Newcastle upon Tyne, Northumberland.
Maria	Norway	The ship ran aground at Newcastle upon Tyne. She was on a voyage from Dram to Newcastle upon Tyne.

== 27 March ==
List of shipwrecks: 27 March 1846
Ship	State	Description
Anna	United Kingdom	The ship was driven ashore at Wick, Caithness with the loss of all but one of her crew.
Charlemagne	United Kingdom	The ship ran aground at the mouth of the Mississippi River.
Corea	United Kingdom	The ship ran aground at the mouth of the Mississippi River.
Coromandel	United Kingdom	The ship ran aground at the mouth of the Mississippi River. She was on a voyage from New Orleans, Louisiana to Liverpool, Lancashire. She was refloated on 11 April.
John and Ann	United Kingdom	The brig ran aground on the Barber Sand, in the North Sea off the coast of Norfolk. She was on a voyage from Sunderland, County Durham to London.
Mary	United Kingdom	The ship was driven ashore in the Copeland Islands, County Down. She was on a voyage from Cardiff, Glamorgan to Glenarm, County Antrim. She was refloated and resumed her voyage.
New Orleans	United States	The ship was driven ashore on the north west coast of Bermuda. She was on a voyage from New York to Bermuda. She was refloated and taken in to Bermuda for repairs.

== 28 March ==
List of shipwrecks: 28 March 1846
Ship	State	Description
Canadian	United Kingdom	The ship was wrecked on the Jardines, off the coast of Cuba. She was on a voyage from Cuba to England.
Dora	United Kingdom	The ship was driven ashore at Ballyferris Point, County Down. She was on a voyage from the Clyde to Wexford. She was refloated and resumed her voyage.

== 29 March ==
List of shipwrecks: 29 March 1846
Ship	State	Description
Vainquor	France	The ship ran aground on the Kentish Knock and capsized. Ten crew were rescued by a fishing boat.

== 30 March ==
List of shipwrecks: 30 March 1846
Ship	State	Description
Demerara	United Kingdom	The ship ran aground in the Friesche Gat and was wrecked with the loss of her captain. She was on a voyage from Newcastle upon Tyne, Northumberland to Hamburg.
Factor	United Kingdom	The ship capsized at Newport, Monmouthshire. She was righted the next day.
Importader	Spain	The ship struck a sunken rock and was damaged. She put in to Vigo.
Irad Ferry	Flag unknown	The ship was driven ashore in the Scheldt at East Flanders, Belgium. She was on a voyage from Trieste to Antwerp, Belgium.
Marie	France	The ship was in collision with Vladislas ( Kingdom of Lombardy–Venetia) and was abandoned off Cape St. Vincent, Portugal with the loss of three of her crew. She was on a voyage from the Rio Grande to Marseille, Bouches-du-Rhône.

== 31 March ==
List of shipwrecks: 31 March 1846
Ship	State	Description
Elizabeth	United Kingdom	The ship was driven ashore "on the August". She was refloated and taken in to Saint Michael's Mount, Cornwall.
Ellen	United Kingdom	The ship was wrecked on the "Island of Cranes" with the loss of one life. She was on a voyage from Liverpool, Lancashire to Veracruz, Mexico.
Waterlily	United Kingdom	The schooner was wrecked at Europa Point, Gibraltar. She was on a voyage from Palermo, Sicily to Bristol, Gloucestershire.

== Unknown date ==
List of shipwrecks: Unknown date in March 1846
Ship	State	Description
Caroline	France	The ship was driven ashore on the coast of Sierra Leone before 10 March. She was consequently condemned.
Charles	(United Kingdom of Great Britain and Ireland) British North America	The ship was sunk by ice off the coast of Newfoundland before 8 March with the loss of a crew member. She was on a voyage from Portugal to Carbonear, Newfoundland.
Galatea	United Kingdom	The ship capsized in the River Tyne at Walker, Northumberland before 26 March. She was refloated and repaired.
Grace	United Kingdom	The ship was driven ashore at Maryport, Cumberland. She was on a voyage from Dundee, Forfarshire to Maryport. She was refloated on 4 March and taken in to Maryport.
Haidee	United Kingdom	The ship was capsized in the Atlantic Ocean before 14 March with the loss of eleven of her sixteen crew. Survivors were rescued by Three Sisters (United Kingdom). Haidee was on a voyage from London to Jamaica.
Henry	United Kingdom	The ship was driven ashore at Portadown, County Antrim before 14 March.
Hero of the Nile	United Kingdom	The ship foundered in the North Sea off Heligoland before 21 March.
John and Samuel	United Kingdom	The ship was driven ashore and damaged at Larne, County Antrim before 14 March.
Louisa	United States	The barque was abandoned in the Atlantic Ocean before 21 March.
Mary	United Kingdom	The schooner was abandoned in the Irish Sea before 21 March.
Robert E. Ward	United Kingdom	The ship was driven ashore at Dundalk, County Louth. She was refloated on 11 March.
Severn	United Kingdom	The ship was wrecked at Aracati, Brazil before 18 March. She was on a voyage from Aracati to Liverpool, Lancashire.
Sidney	United Kingdom	The ship was abandoned in the Atlantic Ocean before 10 March. Her crew were rescued by Talbot (United States).
Thetis	United Kingdom	The ship was driven ashore at Sunderland, County Durham. She was refloated on 24 March and taken in to Sunderland.
Vereeniging	Netherlands	The ship was driven ashore at the mouth of the Llobregat before 3 March. She was on a voyage from Cette, Hérault, France to Rotterdam, South Holland. She had been refloated by 30 March.
