= List of shipwrecks in March 1838 =

The list of shipwrecks in March 1838 includes ships sunk, foundered, wrecked, grounded, or otherwise lost during March 1838.

== 1 March ==
List of shipwrecks: 1 March 1838
Ship	State	Description
Ailsa Craig	United Kingdom	The paddle steamer was damaged by fire at St. Katherine's Wharf, London.
Alonzo	United Kingdom	The brig collided with Indemnity (United Kingdom) off Cromer, Norfolk and was later driven ashore at Blakeney, Norfolk. She was on a voyage from Stockton-on-Tees, County Durham to London. Alonzo was refloated on 8 March and taken into Blakeney.
Anna	United Kingdom	The schooner was wrecked 4 leagues (12 nautical miles (22 km)) south of Figueira da Foz, Portugal.
Jeune-Auguste	France	The ship was destroyed by fire off Cape St. Nicholas, Haiti. Her crew were rescued.
Lancel	United States	The ship was lost off Veracruz, Mexico with the loss of two of her crew.
Relief	United Kingdom	The barque was wrecked off Pederneira, Portugal with the loss of three of her eight crew.
Resolution	United Kingdom	The brig was wrecked on the Salt Scar Rocks, in the North Sea off the coast of Yorkshire. Her crew were rescued by the Hartlepool Lifeboat.

== 2 March ==
List of shipwrecks: 2 March 1838
Ship	State	Description
Aberdeenshire	United Kingdom	The ship was driven ashore at Robin Hoods Bay, Yorkshire. She was refloated and put into Scarborough.
Alfred	United Kingdom	The ship was driven ashore at Bridlington, Yorkshire. She was later refloated and resumed her voyage.
Enterprise	United Kingdom	The ship struck a rock off The Manacles and sank. She was on a voyage from Bury, Lancashire to Ramsgate, Kent.
Fife	United Kingdom	The ship was driven ashore in the Isles of Scilly. She was on a voyage from Newport, Monmouthshire to London. Fife was later refloated.
Phœbe	United Kingdom	The ship was driven ashore at Bridlington. She was later refloated and resumed her voyage.
Providence	United Kingdom	The ship was driven ashore and wrecked at Flamborough Head, Yorkshire. Her crew were rescued. She was on a voyage from Rochester, Kent to Newcastle upon Tyne, Northumberland.
Thornley	United Kingdom	The ship ran aground and was severely damaged at Flamborough Head. She was on a voyage from London to Hartlepool, County Durham. Thornley was refloated and put into Scarborough, Yorkshire.
Waterloo Packet	United Kingdom	The ship ran aground and sank in the River Avon. She was on a voyage from Bristol, Gloucestershire to Cardiff, Glamorgan and Hamburg.

== 3 March ==
List of shipwrecks: 3 March 1838
Ship	State	Description
Howard	United Kingdom	The ship ran aground on the Florida Reef. She was on a voyage from Havana, Cuba to Saint Petersburg, Russia. Howard was later refloated and taken into Key West, Florida Territory.
London Packet	United Kingdom	The ship was driven ashore and wrecked at São Martinho do Porto, Portugal. Her crew were rescued. She was on a voyage from London to Faro, Portugal.
Resolution	United Kingdom	The ship was driven ashore at Redcar, Yorkshire.
Two Brothers	United Kingdom	The ship was driven ashore in Cascaes Bay and was wrecked with the loss of a crew member. She was on a voyage from Newcastle upon Tyne, Northumberland to Lisbon, Portugal.

== 4 March ==
List of shipwrecks: 4 March 1838
Ship	State	Description
Frances	United Kingdom	The ship struck a sunken rock in Gibraltar Bay and foundered. Her crew were rescued. She was on a voyage from Newcastle upon Tyne, Northumberland to Gibraltar.
Perseverance	United Kingdom	The ship was driven ashore at Bayside, Gibraltar.
Ranger	United Kingdom	The schooner was wrecked on the Elbow End Bank, in the North Sea off the mouth of the River Tay. Her five crew were rescued. She was on a voyage from South Shields, County Durham to Perth.
Suffolk	United Kingdom	The ship struck the Pearl Rock and sank. Her crew were rescued. She was on a voyage from Newcastle upon Tyne, Northumberland to Gibraltar.

== 5 March ==
List of shipwrecks: 5 March 1838
Ship	State	Description
New Orleans	United States	The ship was driven ashore 4 nautical miles (7.4 km) north west of Buenos Aires, Argentina. Her crew were rescued. She was on a voyage from Bona Vista to Buenos Aires.
Sir Colin Campbell	United Kingdom	The ship ran aground off Bermuda. She was on a voyage from Savannah, Georgia, United States to Liverpool, Lancashire. Sir Colin Campbell was later refloated and taken into St. George's, Bermuda, where she sank.

== 6 March ==
List of shipwrecks: 6 March 1838
Ship	State	Description
Enterprise	United Kingdom	The ship was driven ashore on Mount Desert Island, Maine, United States. She was on a voyage from Liverpool to Saint John, New Brunswick, British North America. Enterprise was later refloated.
Euphemia	United Kingdom	The schooner was wrecked off Eriskay, Outer Hebrides. The wreck came ashore on Barra on 10 March.

== 7 March ==
List of shipwrecks: 7 March 1838
Ship	State	Description
Elizabeth Caroline	United Kingdom	The ship was abandoned in the Atlantic Ocean. She was on a voyage from Saint Andrews, New Brunswick, British North America to Jamaica.
Euphemia	United Kingdom	The ship was wrecked on the Scalp Sand, in the North Sea off the coast of County Durham. She was on a voyage from Newport, Monmouthshire to South Shields, County Durham.

== 8 March ==
List of shipwrecks: 8 March 1838
Ship	State	Description
Collector	(United Kingdom of Great Britain and Ireland) Saint Vincent	The drogher was lost on this date. Her crew were rescued.
Edmond	United Kingdom	The ship was lost in the River Plate. Her crew were rescued.

== 9 March ==
List of shipwrecks: 9 March 1838
Ship	State	Description
Bourgainville	France	The ship was wrecked in the Fernando de Noronha, Brazil. She was on a voyage from Buenos Aires, Argentina to Havre de Grâce, Seine-Inférieure.

== 10 March ==
List of shipwrecks: 10 March 1838
Ship	State	Description
Benjamin	United Kingdom	The schooner departed from Liverpool, Lancashire for South Shields, County Durham. No further trace, presumed foundered with the loss of all hands.
Palmyra	United Kingdom	The ship was wrecked off Russel Point. Her crew were rescued. She was on a voyage from Holyhead, Anglesey to Lancaster, Lancashire.

== 12 March ==
List of shipwrecks: 12 March 1838
Ship	State	Description
HMS Pincher	Royal Navy	The schooner foundered in the English Channel off the Owers Rock, off the coast of Sussex with the loss of 32 lives. The wreck was raised on 10 June and towed into Portsmouth, Hampshire.
Triumvirate	United Kingdom	The ship was driven ashore at Point La Haye, Newfoundland, British North America. She was on a voyage from Whitehaven, Cumberland to Carbonear, Newfoundland.

== 14 March ==
List of shipwrecks: 14 March 1838
Ship	State	Description
Guard	United Kingdom	The ship was driven ashore at Teignmouth, Devon. She was on a voyage from Newcastle upon Tyne, Northumberland to Plymouth, Devon. Guard was refloated and resumed her voyage.
Nelson	United Kingdom	The ship struck the pier at Whitehaven, Cumberland and was severely damaged. She was on a voyage from Dublin to Whitehaven.

== 15 March ==
List of shipwrecks: 15 March 1838
Ship	State	Description
Lord Eldon	United Kingdom	The ship was driven ashore at Boulogne, Pas-de-Calais, France. She was later refloated and resumed her voyage to London.

== 16 March ==
List of shipwrecks: 16 March 1838
Ship	State	Description
Concepcion	Spain	The ship was wrecked on the Bahamas Bank. Her crew were rescued. She was on a voyage from Havana, Cuba to Cádiz.
Hero	United Kingdom	The schooner was driven ashore and damaged in Table Bay. She was on a voyage from London to Saint Helena. Hero was later refloated.
Swift	United Kingdom	The ship was driven ashore on Lindisfarne, Northumberland. She was later refloated.

== 17 March ==
List of shipwrecks: 17 March 1838
Ship	State	Description
Governor Temple	United Kingdom	The ship was lost at "Sangamar" with the loss of two of her crew. She was on a voyage from Bonavista, Newfoundland, British North America to Bathurst, Gambia.
James	United Kingdom	The ship was driven ashore at Margate, Kent. She was refloated the next day.
Lord Saltoun	United Kingdom	The ship was driven ashore at Emanuel Head, Northumberland. All on board survived. She was on a voyage from Wells-next-the-Sea, Norfolk to Montrose, Forfarshire.
Mermaids	United Kingdom	The schooner foundered off Lindisfarne, Northumberland. Her three crew were rescued by Lord Saltoun (United Kingdom). She was on a voyage from Gourdon, Kincardineshire to Goole, Yorkshire.
Unity	United Kingdom	The ship capsized and foundered in the North Sea off Corton, Suffolk. Her crew were rescued.
Vigilant	United Kingdom	The ship foundered whilst on a voyage from Newport, Monmouthshire to Bristol, Gloucestershire. Her crew were rescued.
William Donaldson	United Kingdom	The ship was driven ashore near "Carlisle", County Cork. She was on a voyage from Gloucester to Limerick. William Donaldson was later refloated and towed into Cork by the steamship Air.

== 19 March ==
List of shipwrecks: 19 March 1838
Ship	State	Description
Janus	United Kingdom	The ship was in collision with William (United Kingdom) and sank in the English Channel off Beachy Head, Sussex. Her crew were rescued. She was on a voyage from Newcastle upon Tyne, Northumberland to the Charente.
Ottoman	United Kingdom	The ship was driven ashore near St. James's Castle, Smyrna, Ottoman Empire. She was on a voyage from Boston, Lincolnshire to Smyrna.

== 20 March ==
List of shipwrecks: 20 March 1838
Ship	State	Description
Alice	United Kingdom	The ship was driven ashore at Whitehaven, Cumberland. Her crew were rescued.
Avon	United Kingdom	The ship was driven ashore and wrecked at Crosby, Lancashire. Her crew survived. She was on a voyage from Natchez to Liverpool.
Brilliant	United Kingdom	The sloop sank at Grimsby, Lincolnshire. She was later refloated.
Betsey	United Kingdom	The schooner was wrecked on the Blacktail Sand. Her crew were rescued by the smack Snowdrop. Betsey was on a voyage from Whitby, Yorkshire to London.
Cam's Delight	United Kingdom	The ship collided with Mary Somerville (United Kingdom) and sank at Liverpool.
Consort	United Kingdom	The ship was driven ashore at Paull, Yorkshire. She was on a voyage from Hull, Yorkshire to Hamburg. Consort was refloated on 22 March.
Deben	United Kingdom	The sloop was driven ashore at Spurn Point, Yorkshire. She was on a voyage from Hull to Rotterdam, South Holland, Netherlands.
Endeavour	United Kingdom	The brig was driven ashore in Bootle Bay.
Hero	(United Kingdom of Great Britain and Ireland) Jersey	The ship was driven ashore and damaged at Camber, Sussex. Four men died attempting to rescue her crew, who were successfully rescued. She was on a voyage from Jersey to Copenhagen, Denmark. Hero was refloated on 23 March.
Kitty	United Kingdom	The ship ran aground on the Hook Sands, in the Bristol Channel. She was on a voyage from St. Clears, Carmarthenshire to Bristol, Gloucestershire.
HMS Lucifer	Royal Navy	The paddle steamer was severely damaged in a collision with Westchester (United States) in Liverpool Bay. She was on a voyage from Liverpool to Dublin. She consequently put back to Liverpool. A passenger was severely injured in the collision.
Mary	United Kingdom	The ship was driven ashore at Skegness, Lincolnshire. She was on a voyage from London to Boston, Lincolnshire.
Mary Ann Martin	United Kingdom	The sloop was driven ashore at Spurn Point. Her crew were rescued. She was on a voyage from Wisbech, Cambridgeshire to Leeds or Wakefield, Yorkshire.
Orient	United Kingdom	The ship was driven ashore and wrecked in Bootle Bay. She was on a voyage from Bombay, India to Liverpool. Orient was refloated on 23 March and taken into Liverpool.
Tredegar or Tredegar Trader	United Kingdom	The ship foundered in the Bristol Channel off Goldcliff, Monmouthshire. Her crew were rescued.
William and Betsey	United Kingdom	The ship was driven ashore at Whitehaven. Her crew were rescued. She was on a voyage from Wigtown to Liverpool. William and Betsey was refloated on 25 March and taken into Whitehaven.

== 21 March ==
List of shipwrecks: 21 March 1838
Ship	State	Description
Endeavour	United Kingdom	The brig was driven ashore in Bootle Bay.
Good Intent	United Kingdom	The ship was driven ashore at Spurn Point, Yorkshire. She was on a voyage from Louth, Lincolnshire to Leeds or Wakefield, Yorkshire.
Kent	United Kingdom	The ship was driven ashore on the coast of Yorkshire. She was refloated and made for Scarborough, Yorkshire but capsized. She was on a voyage from Whitstable, Kent to London.
Norval	France	The whaler was driven ashore at Granville, Manche.
Waterwitch	United Kingdom	The ship was driven ashore near "Voel Nant". Her crew were rescued by Heyworth (United Kingdom).

== 22 March ==
List of shipwrecks: 22 March 1838
Ship	State	Description
Catharine	United Kingdom	The ship was driven ashore at Ryde, Isle of Wight. She was on a voyage from Cork to London. Catherine was later refloated and resumed her voyage.
Heyworth	United Kingdom	The brig was driven ashore at Point of Ayr, Flintshire.
Industry	United Kingdom	The ship was driven ashore and wrecked at Castletown, Isle of Man with the loss of five of her seven crew. She was on a voyage from Whitehaven, Cumberland to Dublin.
St. Patrick	United Kingdom	The ship was capsized by a tornado and sank in the Maleacouri River, Sierra Leone. Her crew were rescued.
Swan	United Kingdom	The sloop was abandoned in Abergele Bay. Her crew survived.
Tyro	United Kingdom	The ship was wrecked near Southport, Lancashire with the loss of all hands. She was on a voyage from Ardglass, County Down to Liverpool, Lancashire.
Watterhorst	Norway	The ship was driven ashore at Umago, Austrian Empire. She was on a voyage from Bergen to Trieste.

== 23 March ==
List of shipwrecks: 23 March 1838
Ship	State	Description
Agnes	United Kingdom	The ship ran aground in the River Liffey and was damaged. She was on a voyage from Dublin to Liverpool, Lancashire.
Congress	United States	The ship was driven ashore near Liverpool.
Elvira	United Kingdom	The ship sank in the Rock Channel, in Liverpool Bay. Her crew were rescued. She was on a voyage from Liverpool to Calcutta, India. Elvira was refloated on 27 March and taken into Liverpool.
Jessie	United Kingdom	The ship was driven ashore at Tarbert, Ayrshire. She was on a voyage from Limerick to Glasgow, Renfrewshire.
Mary Catherine	United Kingdom	The ship struck sunken rocks 5 nautical miles (9.3 km) west of Alexandria, Egypt. Her crew were rescued.
Peril	United Kingdom	The ship was driven ashore on Scharhörn, Hamburg. She was refloated but consequently beached in the Weser, where she became a wreck. Her crew were rescued.
Princess Victoria	United Kingdom	The ship capsized in the Humber at Whitton, Lincolnshire. She was on a voyage from London to Hull, Yorkshire. Princess Victoria righted herself. Her crew survived.
Thomas	United Kingdom	The ship was wrecked on the Maplin Sand, in the North Sea off the coast of Essex.

== 24 March ==
List of shipwrecks: 24 March 1838
Ship	State	Description
Eliza and Jane	United Kingdom	The sloop was wrecked in Rhossili Bay with the loss of all three crew.
Jeremiah	United Kingdom	The sloop was wrecked near Worms Head, Glamorgan. Her crew survived.
Mary	United Kingdom	The ship was wrecked on the Silver Keys. Her crew were rescued. She was on a voyage from Cap Haïtien, Haiti to Cork.
Protector	United Kingdom	The ship was wrecked on Onegada. Her crew were rescued. She was on a voyage from Whitehaven, Cumberland to St. Thomas, Virgin Islands.

== 25 March ==
List of shipwrecks: 25 March 1838
Ship	State	Description
Friends	United Kingdom	The ship ran aground on the North Bank, in Liverpool Bay and was abandoned. She was on a voyage from Carlisle, Cumberland to Flint. Friends was refloated and taken into Liverpool, Lancashire.

== 26 March ==
List of shipwrecks: 26 March 1838
Ship	State	Description
Ulysses	United States	The ship was driven ashore at North Point, Maryland. She was on a voyage from Baltimore, Maryland to Amsterdam, North Holland, Netherlands.

== 27 March ==
List of shipwrecks: 27 March 1838
Ship	State	Description
Sisters	United Kingdom	The ship was in collision with Science (United Kingdom) off Whitby, Yorkshire and was abandoned. Her crew were rescued by Science. Sisters was on a voyage from Gainsborough, Lincolnshire to Newcastle upon Tyne, Northumberland.

== 28 March ==
List of shipwrecks: 28 March 1838
Ship	State	Description
Charles	United Kingdom	The ship sank in the River Avon. She was on a voyage from Cardiff, Glamorgan to Bristol, Gloucestershire.
Rose	United Kingdom	The brig was driven ashore in the Little River, Jamaica. Shew as on a voyage from Falmouth, Cornwall to Montego Bay, Jamaica.

== 29 March ==
List of shipwrecks: 29 March 1838
Ship	State	Description
British Merchant	United Kingdom	The ship ran aground in the Mississippi River. She was on a voyage from New Orleans, Louisiana, United States to Liverpool, Lancashire.
Dart	United Kingdom	The brig was wrecked on the Troubridge Shoals. Her crew were rescued. She was on a voyage from Holdfast Bay, South Australia to King George Sound.
Glasgow	United Kingdom	The ship ran aground in the Mississippi River. She was on a voyage from New Orleans to Liverpool.
Rosa	United Kingdom	The ship was driven ashore at Braken Point, Glamorgan.

== 30 March ==
List of shipwrecks: 30 March 1838
Ship	State	Description
John and Ann	United Kingdom	The ship was wrecked at Sunderland, County Durham. Her crew were rescued.

== 31 March ==
List of shipwrecks: 31 March 1838
Ship	State	Description
Alfred	United Kingdom	The ship ran aground and sank at Sunderland, County Durham. She was on a voyage from King's Lynn, Norfolk to Sunderland.
Hope	United Kingdom	The sloop was driven ashore and severely damaged at Montrose, Forfarshire.
Dungal	United Kingdom	The ship capsized and sank at "Gosford".
Three Brothers	United Kingdom	The sloop was driven ashore at Montrose. She was on a voyage from Montrose to Sunderland, County Durham. Three Brothers was refloated on 7 April.

== Unknown date ==
List of shipwrecks: Unknown date in March 1838
Ship	State	Description
Active	United Kingdom	The ship was driven ashore in Tramore Bay. Her crew were rescued. She was on a voyage from St. Ubes, Portugal to Liverpool, Lancashire. Active was refloated and taken into "Rineshark".
Betsey	United Kingdom	The ship was wrecked on the Pantail Sand, in the North Sea off the coast of Essex.
Betsy	United Kingdom	The ship was scuttled at East Wemyss, Fife.
Blossom	United Kingdom	The ship was scuttled at East Wemyss.
Bransley	United Kingdom	The ship was driven ashore and wrecked at Lamlash, Isle of Arran. She was on a voyage from Sligo to Glasgow, Renfrewshire.
Elizabeth	United Kingdom	The ship was abandoned off the Welsh coast before 14 March. She was taken into Bideford, Devon on that date.
Fanny and Jane	United Kingdom	The ship was driven ashore and wrecked on Formentera, Balearic Islands, Spain. She was on a voyage from Liverpool to Livorno, Grand Duchy of Tuscany.
Florida	United States	The ship was abandoned in the Atlantic Ocean. Her crew were rescued byMinerva (United Kingdom).
Fowaro Castle	United Kingdom	The whaler was wrecked at Mazatlán, Mexico before 10 March. She was on a voyage from London to the South Seas.
Harriet	United Kingdom	The schooner was wrecked on the coast of the Algarve, Portugal. Her crew were rescued.
Helen	United Kingdom	The ship was in collision with HMS Volcano (Royal Navy) in the Mediterranean Sea off Cartagena, Spain and was abandoned. Her crew were rescued by HMS Volcano. Helen was on a voyage from Catania, Sicily to Glasgow.
Jane	(United Kingdom of Great Britain and Ireland) British North America	The sealer was sunk by ice off the coast of Newfoundland before 29 March.
Liberty	United Kingdom	The ship foundered off Stronsay, Orkney Islands before 9 March.
Liberty	United Kingdom	The brig was wrecked with the loss of all hands. She was on a voyage from Newcastle upon Tyne, Northumberland to Great Yarmouth, Norfolk.
Liverpool	United Kingdom	The barque was abandoned in the Atlantic Ocean before 23 March.
Lord Newborough	United Kingdom	The ship was wrecked near Kilrush, County Clare. She was on a voyage from Sligo to Liverpool.
Mary	United Kingdom	The ship was driven ashore near the mouth of the Humber.
Mary Ann	United Kingdom	The ship sank off Clea Ness, Lincolnshire.
Marys	United Kingdom	The ship departed from the Clyde for Killala, County Mayo, presumed subsequently foundered with the loss of all hands. A boat washed up at Glendore, County Donegal.
Rapid	United Kingdom	The ship struck the Plough Rock and was severely damaged. She was on a voyage from Aberdeen to South Shields, County Durham.
Relief	United Kingdom	The ship was driven ashore in the Berlengas, Portugal, before 9 March. She was on a voyage from Plymouth, Devon to Malta.
Sally	(United Kingdom of Great Britain and Ireland) British North America	The sealer was sunk by ice off the coast of Newfoundland before 29 March.
Swallow	United Kingdom	The ship was driven ashore on Islay.
Thornley	United Kingdom	The ship was driven ashore whilst on a voyage from London to Hartlepool, County Durham. She was refloated and put into Scarborough, Yorkshire in a severely damaged condition.
