= Point La Haye =

Town in Newfoundland and Labrador, Canada

Coordinates: 46°54′N 53°36′W

Point La Haye was a small town in Newfoundland and Labrador charted by Captain James Cook in 1770. It had 12 families. The first Postmistress was Mrs. Edward Mandville in 1951.

== See also ==
- List of communities in Newfoundland and Labrador
