= Portskerra =

Coordinates: 58.56861°N 3.93731°W

Portskerra: Scottish Gaelic: Port Sgeire
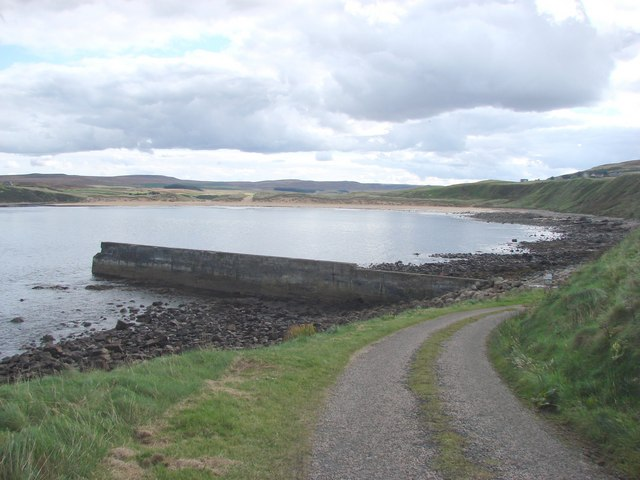
- Portskerra Pier

- Location within the Sutherland area
- OS grid reference: NC874661
- Council area: Highland
- Lieutenancy area: Sutherland
- Country: Scotland
- Sovereign state: United Kingdom
- Post town: Melvich
- Postcode district: KW14
- Police: Scotland
- Fire: Scottish
- Ambulance: Scottish

Portskerra (from Scottish Gaelic Port Sgeire 'skerry harbour') is a hamlet that overlooks Melvich Bay in Sutherland, Highland, Scotland.

The village of Melvich is less than a mile southeast.
