= St Ola =

Coordinates: 58°58′5″N 2°58′2″W

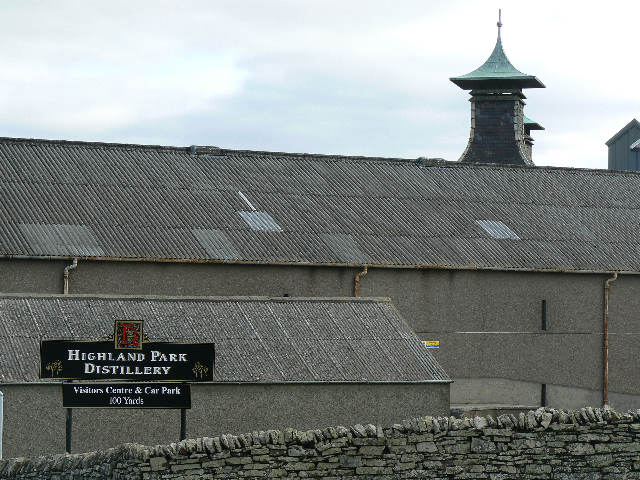
Highland Park distillery on the outskirts of Kirkwall

St Ola is a parish on Mainland, Orkney. It is in the centre of the island, east of the parish Firth and north of Holm. It contains the capital and largest town of the Orkney archipelago, Kirkwall. Both Kirkwall (Old Norse: kirkjuvagr, church-bay) and St Ola may take their name from the church of St. Olaf, built about 1035 and the remains of which can be seen on Saint Olaf's Wynd in Kirkwall.

Highland Park, the most northerly Scotch whisky distillery, is on the outskirts of Kirkwall.

Several ships of the North of Scotland, Orkney & Shetland Steam Navigation Company (later P&O Scottish Ferries) were named St Ola.

Prof John Tait was born here in 1878.
