= List of shipwrecks in April 1859 =

The list of shipwrecks in April 1859 includes ships sunk, foundered, grounded, or otherwise lost during April 1859.

== 1 April ==
List of shipwrecks: 1 April 1859
Ship	State	Description
Alma	United Kingdom	The ship ran aground on the Penarth Sands, in the Bristol Channel off the coast of Glamorgan and sank. Her crew were rescued. Almar was on a voyage from Newport, Monmouthshire to Southampton, Hampshire. She was refloated.
Antoinette	Netherlands	The barque was wrecked at the mouth of the River Plate. Her crew were rescued. She was on a voyage from Cádiz, Spain to Montevideo, Uruguay and Buenos Aires, Argentina.
Betsey	United Kingdom	The brig ran aground at the mouth of the River Tees. She was refloated but sprang a leak and sank in the North Sea off Souter Point, Northumberland. Her crew were rescued. She was on a voyage from Whitby, Yorkshire to Newcastle upon Tyne, Northumberland.
Bjarke	Sweden	The ship was run down and sunk by Texian Star (United States). Her crew were rescued by the fishing smack Perseverance (United Kingdom). Bjarke was on a voyage from Nyköping to Liverpool, Lancashire, United Kingdom.
Clarance	United Kingdom	The ship ran aground and was beached at Figueira da Foz, Portugal. She was on a voyage from Newcastle upon Tyne to Figueira da Foz.
George Brown	United Kingdom	The ship was driven ashore 2 nautical miles (3.7 km) east of Whitehaven, Cumberland. She was on a voyage from Fleetwood, Lancashire to Whitehaven. She was refloated on 5 April and taken in to Whitehaven.
Governor	(United Kingdom of Great Britain and Ireland) Guernsey	The schooner was driven ashore at St. Mawes, Cornwall. She was on a voyage from Seville, Spain to London. She was refloated and beached.
Grace T. Powers	United States	The fishing schooner was lost on the Georges Bank in a terrible gale. Lost with all 8 hands.
Harriet	United Kingdom	The ship ran aground on the Penarth Sands and sank. Her crew were rescued. She was on a voyage from Newport to Southampton.
Indian Queen	United Kingdom	The full-rigged ship struck an iceberg in the Pacific Ocean and was abandoned by fifteen of her crew and two stowaways, who were drowned when their boat was swamped. She was on a voyage from Melbourne, Victoria to Liverpool. She put in to Valparaíso, Chile on 10 May for repairs.
Ludwig	Rostock	The ship ran aground on the Bredgrund, off the Droogden Lightship (Prussia) and was damaged. Her crew were rescued. she was on a voyage from Danzig to Newcastle upon Tyne. She was later refloated and taken in to Copenhagen, Denmark, where she arrived on 12 April.
Ouzel Galley	United Kingdom	The ship was wrecked in the Atlantic Ocean (33°43′N 54°18′W). Her crew were rescued on 4 April by Ann E. Hooper (United States). Ouzel Galley was on a voyage from Trinidad to Dublin.
Porkonmorin	Norway	The ship collided with the schooner Era (United Kingdom) in The Downs. She was towed in to Dover, Kent, United Kingdom in a waterlogged condition.
Tyro	United Kingdom	The ship ran aground on the Penarth Sands and sank. Her crew were rescued.
Venerable	United Kingdom	The barque foundered 40 nautical miles (74 km) off Viana do Castelo, Portugal. Her thirteen crew were rescued by the steamship Alhambra (United Kingdom). She was on a voyage from South Shields, County Durham to Barcelona, Spain.
Venskabet	Norway	The ship ran aground at the mouth of the River Tees. She was on a voyage from Porsgrund to Stockton-on-Tees, County Durham. She was refloated and taken in to Middlesbrough, Yorkshire in a waterlogged condition.
William	United Kingdom	The ship was driven on to the Filly Tail Rocks in Runswick Bay and was abandoned. She was on a voyage from Spalding, Lincolnshire to Newcastle upon Tyne, Northumberland. She floated off and sank.

== 2 April ==
List of shipwrecks: 2 April 1859
Ship	State	Description
Ann Taylow	United Kingdom	The ship ran aground on the Giessen Reef, in the Baltic Sea. . She was on a voyage from Newcastle upon Tyne, Northumberland to Kiel, Prussia. She was refloated and completed her voyage.
Egbert	United Kingdom	The barque ran aground at Civitavecchia, Papal States. She was on a voyage from Newcastle upon Tyne to Civitavecchia. She was refloated.
Jane	United Kingdom	The Yorkshire Billyboy ran aground on the Cockle Sand, in the North Sea off the coast of Norfolk. She was on a voyage from Stockton on Tees, County Durham to London. She was refloated and taken in to Great Yarmouth, Norfolk in a leaky condition.
Jenny Walker	United Kingdom	The brig ran aground on the Maplin Sand, in the North Sea off the coast of Essex. She was on a voyage from Chatham, Kent to Newcastle upon Tyne, Northumberland. She was refloated and towed in to Sheerness, Kent by the tug Daring (United Kingdom).
Preston	United Kingdom	The steamship was wrecked near Rhosneigr, Anglesey. Her fifteen crew were rescued. She was on a voyage from Bordeaux, Gironde, France to Liverpool, Lancashire.
Susannah	United Kingdom	The ship ran aground on the Stoney Binks, in the North Sea off the mouth of the Humber. She was on a voyage from Great Yarmouth, Norfolk to Sunderland, County Durham. She was refloated and put in to Bridlington, Yorkshire in a leaky condition.
Velocity	United Kingdom)	The brig ran aground on the Sizewell Bank, in the North Sea off the coast of Suffolk, United Kingdom and sank. Her eight crew were rescued by the Thorpeness Lifeboat. She was on a voyage from Hull, Yorkshire to Torre del Mar, Spain.

== 3 April ==
List of shipwrecks: 3 April 1859
Ship	State	Description
Baron de Caters	Portugal	The steamship was severely damaged by fire in the Tagus. The fire was extinguished with assistance from the steamship Alhambra (United Kingdom).
Jon Juan	Brazil	The ship foundered in the Atlantic Ocean. Her crew were rescued. She was on a voyage from Pernambuco to a British port.
General Williams	United Kingdom	The steamship foundered in the Mediterranean Sea (36°10′N 18°20′E). All 42 people on board were rescued by the brig Augustin Elise (France). General Williams was on a voyage from London to Piraeus, Greece and Smyrna, Ottoman Empire.
Roberts	United Kingdom	The ship ran aground at Maranhão, Brazil. She was on a voyage from Cardiff, Glamorgan to Maranhão. She was refloated the next day.
Rugia	Flag unknown	The ship was wrecked on the Kentish Knock.
Toneich	Trieste	The ship was driven ashore at Pola, Austrian Empire. She was on a voyage from the River Tyne to Trieste.

== 4 April ==
List of shipwrecks: 4 April 1859
Ship	State	Description
Elephant	United Kingdom	The schooner was driven ashore at Ballyquarter Point, County Down. Her crew were rescued.
Indefatigable	United Kingdom	The barque was driven ashore at Punta Mala, Spain. She was refloated on 6 April.
Tonoic	Austrian Empire	The brig was driven ashore near Pula.

== 5 April ==
List of shipwrecks: 5 April 1859
Ship	State	Description
Coquette	United Kingdom	The brig struck a sunken rock and was beached in the Sound of Mull. She was on a voyage from Liverpool, Lancashire to Newcastle upon Tyne, Northumberland. She was later refloated and temporary repairs made to enable her to resume her voyage.
Marie	United Kingdom	The schooner was sighted off Portland Bill, Dorset whilst on a voyage from Newcastle upon Tyne, Northumberland to Marseille, Bouches-du-Rhône, France. No further trace, presumed foundered with the loss of all hands.
Remedy	United Kingdom	The ship was driven ashore near Ballyhalbert, County Down.
Whim	United Kingdom	The ship was driven ashore at Hartlepool, County Durham.

== 6 April ==
List of shipwrecks: 6 April 1859
Ship	State	Description
Andromache	United Kingdom	The ship departed from Colombo, Ceylon for London. No further trace, presumed foundered with the loss of all hands.
Catherine	United Kingdom	The ship ran aground in the Zuyder Zee near the Pampus, North Holland, Netherlands. She was on a voyage from Newcastle upon Tyne, Northumberland to Amsterdam, North Holland. She was refloated the next day and taken in to Amsterdam.
Mulhouse	United Kingdom	The ship caught fire and sank at New Orleans, Louisiana, United States.
Perthshire	United Kingdom	The ship foundered in the Atlantic Ocean. Her crew were rescued by the brig Anna Catharina (Netherlands). Perthshire was on a voyage from Liverpool, Lancashire to Alicante, Spain.

== 7 April ==
List of shipwrecks: 7 April 1859
Ship	State	Description
Bercaldine	(United Kingdom of Great Britain and Ireland) British North America	The barque was abandoned in the Atlantic Ocean. Her crew were rescued. She was on a voyage from Liverpool, Lancashire to Halifax, Nova Scotia. She sank on 12 April.
Britannia	United Kingdom	The steamship collided with the steamship Bruiser (United Kingdom) and sank at Newcastle upon Tyne, Northumberland. Her crew were rescued. She was on a voyage from Newcastle upon Tyne to Leith, Lothian. She was refloated, temporary repairs made and she resumed her voyage.
Elizabeth	United Kingdom	The ship was run into by a brig and was abandoned off Mort Point, Devon. Her five crew survived.
Enterprise	United Kingdom	The schooner was wrecked at Abbey Head, Kirkcudbrightshire. She was on a voyage from Belfast, County Antrim to Maryport, Cumberland.
Kensington	United Kingdom	The ship was driven ashore in the Yangtze Kiang. She was on a voyage from New Zealand to Shanghai, China.
Ocean Queen	United Kingdom	The steamship struck a submerged object and sank at Hull. She was on a voyage from Rotterdam, South Holland, Netherlands to Hull.
Prima Donna	United Kingdom	The ship ran aground on the Holm Sand, in the North Sea off the coast of Suffolk. She was on a voyage from Sunderland, County Durham to London. She was refloated.

== 8 April ==
List of shipwrecks: 8 April 1859
Ship	State	Description
Britannia	United Kingdom	The steamship collided with the steamship Bruiser (United Kingdom) and sank in the River Tyne. She was on a voyage from South Shields, County Durham to Leith, Lothian.
Commerce	United Kingdom	The ship ran aground on the Holm Sand, in the North Sea off the coast of Suffolk and sank. Her crew survived. She was on a voyage from Newcastle upon Tyne, Northumberland to Rotterdam, South Holland, Netherlands.
Cousins	United Kingdom	The ship sank off Kimmeridge, Dorset. Her crew were rescued.

== 9 April ==
List of shipwrecks: 9 April 1859
Ship	State	Description
San Servando	United Kingdom	The steamship was driven ashore north of Green Island, Spain. She was refloated the next day.
Secret	United Kingdom	The schooner was driven ashore on Cephalonia, United States of the Ionian Islands. She was on a voyage from Cephalonia to Zakynthos, United States of the Ionian Islands and Patras, Kingdom of Greece.

== 10 April ==
List of shipwrecks: 10 April 1859
Ship	State	Description
Cato	United States	The ship caught fire at "Mazagan", near Bombay, India and was scuttled. She was on a voyage from Calcutta to Bombay. The ship was severely damaged and was consequently condemned.
Elisa Annette	Netherlands	The ship was wrecked in the North Sea. Her crew were rescued by the fishing boat Denison (United Kingdom).
John and Jane	United Kingdom	The ship struck the pier and sank at Great Yarmouth, Norfolk. She was on a voyage from Seaham, County Durham to Great Yarmouth.
HMS Sir Henry Lawrence	Royal Navy	The troopship struck a sunken wreck at the mouth of the Indus and was wrecked. All on board survived.
Vrader	United Kingdom	The brigantine caught fire whilst on a voyage from Sunderland, County Durham to Inverness. She put in to Berwick upon Tweed, Northumberland.
Zephyr	United Kingdom	The ship ran aground at Lowestoft, Suffolk. She was on a voyage from Gravelines, Nord, France to Newcastle upon Tyne, Northumberland.

== 11 April ==
List of shipwrecks: 11 April 1859
Ship	State	Description
Ava	United Kingdom	The barque was run down and sunk in the English Channel off The Lizard, Cornwall by HMS Perseverance (Royal Navy). Her crew were rescued by HMS Perseverance. Ava was on a voyage from Cardiff, Glamorgan to Gibraltar.
Matilda	United Kingdom	The ship ran aground in the Bay of Oxfort, Saint Lucia. She was refloated.
Minalto	United Kingdom	The brig was wrecked between "Castillos" and Cape St. Mary's, Portugal with the loss of a crew member.
Morning Star	United Kingdom	The ship was driven against the pier at Sunderland, County Durham and was wrecked. Her crew were rescued.
Schiedam	United Kingdom	The ship ran aground on the Herd Sand, in the North Sea off the coast of County Durham. She was on a voyage from Hamburg to North Shields, County Durham. She was refloated and towed in to North Shields.
Trader	United Kingdom	The ship caught fire at Berwick upon Tweed, Northumberland. She was on a voyage from Sunderland to Inverness.
William	United Kingdom	The brig struck the pier and was severely damaged at North Shields.
William Stanley	United Kingdom	The brigantine was abandoned in the Atlantic Ocean (44°27′N 37°46′W). Her crew were rescued by R. M. Mills (United States). William Stanley was on a voyage from Matanzas, Cuba to Cork.

== 12 April ==
List of shipwrecks: 12 April 1859
Ship	State	Description
African	United States	The brig was wrecked on the coast of Haiti.
Eden	United Kingdom	The brig foundered in the North Sea 60 nautical miles (110 km) east of Sunderland, County Durham. Her crew were rescued by Sanders Minde (Norway).
Franklin	United States	The whaler was wrecked to the north of Pitt Island in New Zealand's Chatham Islands when her anchor chain parted during a heavy swell and she was driven onto rocks.
Ochtertyre	United Kingdom	The ship was abandoned in the Atlantic Ocean (3°40′N 20°10′W). All on board were rescued by Louisa Maria (Netherlands). Ochtertyre was on a voyage from London to Port Natal, Cape Colony.
Terror	(United Kingdom of Great Britain and Ireland) Tasmania	The whaling barque was wrecked on the east coast of Chatham Island, New Zealand when she struck a reef in a heavy swell. Crew and passengers saved.

== 13 April ==
List of shipwrecks: 13 April 1859
Ship	State	Description
Beta	United Kingdom	The ship foundered in the North Sea off "Dunlington" with the loss of all hands.
Betsey	United Kingdom	The schooner was driven ashore at Étretat, Seine-Inférieure, France. Her crew were rescued. She was on a voyage from Newcastle upon Tyne, Northumberland to Havre de Grâce, Seine=Inférieurd.
Economy	United Kingdom	The ship ran aground at Sunderland, County Durham. She was on a voyage from Sunderland to Bordeaux, Gironde, France. She was refloated and resumed her voyage, but consequently put in to Harwich, Essex in a leaky condition.
Emma Fredericksen	Hamburg	The barque was driven ashore near "Siapenriee", Brazil. She was on a voyage from Rio de Janeiro, Brazil to New York.
Flirt	United Kingdom	The brig foundered in the Bay of Biscay. Her eight crew were rescued by the galiot Jonge Wouter (Netherlands. Flirt was on a voyage from South Shields to Porto, Portugal.
Garland	United Kingdom	The sloop was driven ashore and wrecked at Dover, Kent. Her crew were rescued.
Hope	United Kingdom	The schooner was driven ashore at Withernsea, Yorkshire with the loss of her captain. She was on a voyage from Sunderland to London. She broke up on 16 April.

== 14 April ==
List of shipwrecks: 14 April 1859
Ship	State	Description
Admiral Pelville	France	The ship ran aground on the French Reef. She was on a voyage from Havana, Cuba to Marseille, Bouches-du-Rhône. She was refloated and taken in to Charleston, South Carolina in a severely leaky condition.
Cyrus	United Kingdom	The ship sprang a leak and foundered in the North Sea off Flamborough Head, Yorkshire. Her crew were rescued. She was on a voyage from North Shields, County Durham to London.
Perise	United Kingdom	The full-rigged ship was driven ashore and wrecked 1.5 nautical miles (2.8 km) east of Port Frances, Cape Colony. She was on a voyage from Bombay, India to Glasgow, Renfrewshire.

== 15 April ==
List of shipwrecks: 15 April 1859
Ship	State	Description
Amsterdam	Netherlands	The steamship ran aground off Terschelling, Friesland. She was on a voyage from Hamburg to Amsterdam, North Holland. She was refloated on 6 July.
Liberal	United Kingdom	The Yorkshire Billyboy was wrecked on the Goodwin Sands, Kent with the loss of three of her four crew. The survivor was rescued by the lifeboat Royal Thames Yacht Club (United Kingdom. Liberal was on a voyage from Grangemouth, Stirlingshire to Saint-Valery-sur-Somme, Somme, France.
Ouragan	France	The ship was driven ashore near Saint Helier, Jersey. Her crew were rescued.

== 16 April ==
List of shipwrecks: 16 April 1859
Ship	State	Description
Arno	United Kingdom	The brig ran aground on the Gunfleet Sand, in the North Sea off the coast of Essex. She was refloated but found to be severely leaky and was beached on the West Rocks. Her crew were rescued. She was on a voyage from Hartlepool, County Durham to London.

== 17 April ==
List of shipwrecks: 17 April 1859
Ship	State	Description
Dundonald	United Kingdom	The brig sprang a leak and sank 4 nautical miles (7.4 km) off Viveiro, Spain. Her crew survived. She was on a voyage from Liverpool, Lancashire to Gibraltar.
Jane	United Kingdom	The ship was driven ashore at Aberdeen. She was on a voyage from Crail, Fife to Aberdeen. She was refloated on 19 April.
Libertas	United Kingdom	The ship was driven ashore at Snapper Point, in the River Torrens.

== 18 April ==
List of shipwrecks: 18 April 1859
Ship	State	Description
Aliart	Norway	The barque ran aground on the Bandzee Bank, in the North Sea of the coast of the Kingdom of Hanover and capsized with the loss of all hands. She was on a voyage from Kragerø to Hull, Yorkshire, United Kingdom.
Tjaretz Misr	Hamburg	The ship was driven ashore and wrecked on Scharhörn. Her crew were rescued. She was on a voyage from Caldera to Hamburg.
Ursula	United Kingdom	The ship was abandoned in the Atlantic Ocean. Her crew were rescued by Carl (United Kingdom). Ursula was on a voyage from Liverpool, Lancashire to Halifax, Nova Scotia, British North America.

== 19 April ==
List of shipwrecks: 19 April 1859
Ship	State	Description
Inrika	United Kingdom	The ship ran aground on the Longsand, in the North Sea off the coast of Essex, United Kingdom. She was on a voyage from Uddevalla to London, United Kingdom. She was refloated but consequently foundered. Her crew were rescued
Midsummer	United Kingdom	The brig was driven ashore on Scharhörn. Her crew survived. she was on a voyage from Cuxhaven to Sunderland, County Durham.

== 20 April ==
List of shipwrecks: 20 April 1859
Ship	State	Description
Lady Head	United Kingdom	The ship was wrecked at the mouth of the Krom River with the loss of 23 of the 28 people on board. She was on a voyage from Rangoon, Burma to Liverpool, Lancashire.
Oriel	Netherlands	The brig was deliberately scuttled in the English Channel. She was on a voyage from the Black Sea to Amsterdam, North Holland. She was taken in to Folkestone, Kent, United Kingdom in a waterlogged condition.

== 21 April ==
List of shipwrecks: 21 April 1859
Ship	State	Description
Lark	United Kingdom	The sloop was run down and sunk in Stokes Bay by HMS Doris (Royal Navy) with the loss of all three crew.
Speculation	United Kingdom	The brig ran aground on the Spanish Battery Rocks, on the coast of County Durham. She was on a voyage from Wisbech, Cambridgeshire to South Shields, County Durham. She was refloated with the assistance of the South Shields Lifeboat and taken in to port.
Victor Emile	France	The ship foundered. Her crew were rescued by Berenicia (United Kingdom).

== 22 April ==
List of shipwrecks: 22 April 1859
Ship	State	Description
Eliza Laing	United Kingdom	The barque ran aground at Smyrna, Ottoman Empire. She was on a voyage from Sunderland, County Durham to Smyrna. She was refloated.
Jeanette	United Kingdom	The ship was driven ashore at Great Yarmouth, Norfolk. She was on a voyage from Newcastle upon Tyne, Northumberland to Plymouth, Devon.
Manxman	(United Kingdom of Great Britain and Ireland) Isle of Man	The smack was run into by Ouangondy (United Kingdom) and sank at Birkenhead, Cheshire.
Maranham	France	The steamship sprang a leak foundered off Saint-Nazaire, Ille-et-Vilaine. Her crew were rescued. She was on a voyage from Liverpool, Lancashire, United Kingdom to Nantes, Loire-Inférieure.

== 23 April ==
List of shipwrecks: 23 April 1859
Ship	State	Description
Natalie	United Kingdom	The ship was wrecked on Colaba Island, Bombay, India with the loss of three of her seventeen crew. She was on a voyage from Glasgow, Renfrewshire to Bombay.

== 24 April ==
List of shipwrecks: 24 April 1859
Ship	State	Description
Alecto	Sweden	The barque was Winterton-on-Sea, Norfolk, United Kingdom. Her crew were rescued by the Winterton Lifeboat.
Ann	United Kingdom	The schooner was severely damaged at Fraserburgh, Aberdeenshire. She was on a voyage from Sunderland, County Durham to Fraserburgh.
Colorado	United States	The full-rigged ship was driven ashore and wrecked at Point Palmyras, Ceylon with the loss of four of the 27 people on board.
La Foi	France	The ship foundered in the Indian Ocean between Ceylon and Negapatam, India with the loss of 400 lives.
Lively	United Kingdom	The brig was abandoned in the Atlantic Ocean 108 nautical miles (200 km) north west by north of Cape Finisterre, Spain (43°58′N 11°18′W). Her crew were rescued by the barque Lubinka (Russia). Lively was on a voyage from Swansea, Glamorgan to Gibraltar.
Mary Lyon	United Kingdom	The ship ran aground on the Brake Sand. She was on a voyage from London to Porto, Portugal. She was refloated with the assistance of the luggers Champion and Fawn (both United Kingdom).
St. Nicholas	United States	Boiler explosion on Mississippi River, significant loss of life

== 25 April ==
List of shipwrecks: 25 April 1859
Ship	State	Description
Ballengeich	United Kingdom	The ship was wrecked 10 nautical miles (19 km) south of Negapatam, India. She was on a voyage from the River Clyde to Calcutta, India.
Eliza	United Kingdom	The ship was driven ashore and wrecked at Lowestoft, Suffolk.
Enterprise	United Kingdom	The ship was driven ashore and wrecked south of Negapatam.
Johns	United Kingdom	The ship struck the Sheringham Shoal, in the North Sea off the coast of Norfolk. Her crew were rescued by Rienzi ( Stettin). Johns was on a voyage from North Shields, County Durham to London.
Lady Vaughan	United Kingdom	The brig ran aground on the Herd Sand, in the North Sea off the coast of County Durham. She was on a voyage from Rotterdam, South Holland, Netherlands to South Shields, County Durham. She was refloated.
Laurel	United Kingdom	The schooner was driven ashore and wrecked at Tynemouth, Northumberland. Her five crew were rescued by the South Shields Lifeboat.
Mary Jane	United Kingdom	The ship was wrecked on a ref off Inchkeith. Her crew were rescued. She was on a voyage from Antwerp, Belgium to Leith, Lothian.
Mary Sparkes	United Kingdom	The full-rigged ship was wrecked at Negapatam.
Monarch	United Kingdom	The barque was driven ashore and wrecked 10 nautical miles (19 km) south of Negapatam. The majority of the 180 coolies on board perished. She was on a voyage from Negapatam to Penang, Malaya.
Quest	United Kingdom	The brig was driven ashore at Newbiggin, Northumberland. Her crew were rescued. She was on a voyage from Hamburg to Hartlepool, County Durham. She had become a wreck by 7 May.
Rainbow	United Kingdom	The brig ran aground on the Middle Sand, in the North Sea. She was on a voyage from Hartlepool to London. She was refloated and taken in to Grimsby, Lincolnshire in a leaky condition. Subsequently repaired.

== 26 April ==
List of shipwrecks: 26 April 1859
Ship	State	Description
Eagle	United Kingdom	The brig was driven ashore at the mouth of the River Wear. Her crew were rescued by rocket apparatus.
Friends	United Kingdom	The ship was run ashore at Grimsby, Lincolnshire in a waterlogged condition. She was on a voyage from Sunderland, County Durham to London.
Hannibal	United Kingdom	The schooner ran aground and was damaged at Sunderland. She was on a voyage from Littlehampton, Sussex to Sunderland.
Juno	United Kingdom	The ship was driven ashore and wrecked at St. Ives, Cornwall. She was refloated on 1 May and taken in to St. Ives.
Kate	United Kingdom	The brig ran aground, struck the pier and was damaged at Sunderland. She was on a voyage from London to Sunderland.
Miaza	United Kingdom	The brig sprang a leak and was run ashore at Grimsby.
Sophie	Sweden	The ship ran aground at Hartlepool, County Durham. She was on a voyage from Gothenburg to Hull, Yorkshire, United Kingdom.

== 27 April ==
List of shipwrecks: 27 April 1859
Ship	State	Description
Amelia	United Kingdom	The ship struck the Heriot Rock and was holed. She was on a voyage from South Shields, County Durham to Málaga, Spain. She put in to Leith, Lothian.
Dusty Miller	United Kingdom	The schooner was driven ashore and wrecked on Ireland's Eye, County Dublin with the loss of all eleven crew.
Fame	United Kingdom	The fishing vessel capsized near the Seven Stones Lightship ( Trinity House) in a severe east-south-east gale while running for shelter in the Isles of Scilly. There were no survivors.
Marchioness of Breadalbane	United Kingdom	The ship ran aground at Cagliari, Sardinia. She was on a voyage from Agrigento, Sicily to Hamburg. She was later refloated, and sailed on 26 May.
Napier	United Kingdom	The barque was wrecked at Peniche, Portugal.
Pomona	United States	The full-rigged ship was wrecked on the Blackwater Bank, in the Irish Sea off the coast of County Wexford with the loss of 389 of the 412 people on board. She was on a voyage from Liverpool, Lancashire, United Kingdom to New York.
Princess	United Kingdom	The brig was wrecked near Sines, Portugal. Her crew were rescued. She was on a voyage from Sines to Dublin.
Thornley	United Kingdom	The brig struck the Bass Rock and sank in the Firth of Forth. Her seven crew were rescued by the schooner Fantasy (United Kingdom). Thornley was on a voyage from Sunderland, County Durham to Leith, Lothian.

== 28 April ==
List of shipwrecks: 28 April 1859
Ship	State	Description
Azalea	France	The schooner was driven ashore at Skerries, County Dublin, United Kingdom. She was on a voyage from Troon, Ayrshire, United Kingdom to Nantes, Loire-Inférieure.
Anne	United Kingdom	The ship sank at Holyhead, Anglesey. She was on a voyage from Poole, Dorset to Runcorn, Cheshire.
Fiducia, or Frederica	Kingdom of Hanover	The ship was driven ashore and sank in Loch Ryan. Her crew were rescued. She was on a voyage from Alexandria, Egypt to the Clyde.
James Annie	United Kingdom	The ship was driven ashore and severely damaged at Holyhead. She was on a voyage from Poole, Dorset to Liverpool, Lancashire.
Joseph and Elizabeth	United Kingdom	The ship was driven ashore at Kessingland, Suffolk. She was on a voyage from Dieppe, Seine-Inférieure, France to South Shields, County Durham. She was refloated on 6 May and taken in to Lowestoft, Suffolk in a leaky condition.
Margaret	United Kingdom	The ship struck the Humpts, in the English Channel and was damaged. She was on a voyage from Newcastle upon Tyne, Northumberland to Guernsey, Channel Islands. She arrived at Guernsey in a leaky condition.
Mary Ann	United Kingdom	The ship was driven ashore at Holyhead.
Richard	United Kingdom	The brig drove against the pier and sank at Holyhead. She was on a voyage from Cardiff, Glamorgan to Liverpool.
William	United Kingdom	The schooner was driven ashore at Ben Head, County Louth. Her crew were rescued. She was on a voyage from Preston, Lancashire to Newry, County Antrim.

== 29 April ==
List of shipwrecks: 29 April 1859
Ship	State	Description
Æolus	Norway	The ship ran aground on the Leman and Ower Sand, in the North Sea, and sank with the loss of eight of her fourteen crew. She was on a voyage from South Shields, County Durham to Odesa.
Amlwch Packet	United Kingdom	The ship sank at Holyhead, Anglesey.
Antje	Netherlands	The ship was driven ashore and wrecked at "Portman", Ireland. She was on a voyage from Antwerp, Belgium to Liverpool, Lancashire, United Kingdom.
Austin	United States	The ship was destroyed by fire at Buenos Aires, Argentina.
Carley	United Kingdom	The sloop was severely damaged by fire at Sunderland, County Durham.
Glencairn	United Kingdom	The ship foundered in the North Sea. Her crew survived. She was on a voyage from South Shields to Hamburg.
Gulina	France	The brig was driven ashore at Killough, County Down, United Kingdom.
Helios	Norway	The barque was wrecked on the Leman and Ower Sand, in the North Sea with the loss of eight of her fourteen crew. Survivors were rescued by Earl of Durham (United Kingdom). Helios was on a voyage from South Shields to Odesa.
Mary and Jane	United Kingdom	The schooner was driven ashore and wrecked at Holyhead.
Reaper	United Kingdom	The ship was driven ashore at Holyhead.

== 30 April ==
List of shipwrecks: 30 April 1859
Ship	State	Description
Industrious	United Kingdom	The schooner foundered in the Atlantic Ocean (38°30′N 11°00′W). Her crew were rescued by the barque Norna (Norway). Industrious was on a voyage from Liverpool, Lancashire to the Rio Grande do Sul.

== Unknown date ==
List of shipwrecks: Unknown date in April 1859
Ship	State	Description
Annabella	United Kingdom	The schooner was driven ashore at Aberdeen. She was on a voyage from Thurso, Caithness to Berwick upon Tweed, Northumberland. She was refloated and resumed her voyage, arriving at Berwick upon Tweed on 19 April.
Celestine Marie	France	The fishing boat was wrecked at Saint-Malo with the loss of all nine crew.
Charles E. Grover	United States	The fishing schooner was probably lost on the Georges Bank in a terrible gale on 1 April. Lost with all 9 hands.
Charles Tupper	United Kingdom	The brigantine was lost in the Strait of Magellan before 28 April.
Clyde	United Kingdom	The barque was driven ashore at Point Sentinas, 3 leagues (9 nautical miles (17 km) from Adra, Spain before 15 April. She was on a voyage from South Shields, County Durham to Adra.
Elsina Annette	Flag unknown	The ship foundered in the Dogger Bank between 15 and 20 April. Crew presumed drowned.
Eurpoa	United Kingdom	The ship was abandoned in the Atlantic Ocean. Her crew were rescued by Twee Vrienden (Netherlands).
Fortitude	United Kingdom	The barque was abandoned at sea.
Gratitude	United Kingdom	The ship was driven ashore in "Loch Eroe" before 26 April. She was on a voyage from Liverpool, Lancashire to Rotterdam, South Holland, Netherlands. She was refloated and taken in to Stornoway, Isle of Lewis, Outer Hebrides.
Indefatigable	United Kingdom	The barque was driven ashore at Punta Mala, Spain.
Jane	United Kingdom	The ship foundered off the coast of Cornwall before 29 April.
Linne	Norway	The brig ran aground on the Herd Sand, in the North Sea off the coast of County Durham before 8 April.
Loodianah	United Kingdom	The ship was driven ashore at Carnsore Point, County Wexford before 4 April. She was on a voyage from Mobile, Alabama, United States to Liverpool.
Margaret	United Kingdom	The paddle tug sank at South Shields. She was refloated.
Morleys	United Kingdom	The ship sank in the River Tyne at Jarrow, County Durham. She was refloated.
Mulhouse	United Kingdom	The ship caught fire and sank at New Orleans, Louisiana, United States.
Pearl	United Kingdom	The brig was driven ashore at Cardiff, Glamorgan. She was refloated and taken in to Cardiff.
Revival	United Kingdom	The barque was wrecked at Hayward's Point near the mouth of Otago Harbour, New Zealand while en route from The Bluff to Port Chalmers.
Rolla	United Kingdom	The barque was abandoned in the Atlantic Ocean. Her crew were rescued by Hortense (France). Rolla was on a voyage from the River Tyne to New York, United States.
Rose of Sharon	United Kingdom	The full-rigged ship was driven ashore and wrecked on the French coast with the loss of four of her crew.
Ruia	Hamburg	The ship was wrecked. She was on a voyage from Hamburg to Newfoundland, British North America.
Soskommoren	Norway	The schooner was abandoned in the English Channel. She was on a voyage from Kragerø to Liverpool. She was discovered 12 nautical miles (22 km) off South Foreland, Kent, United Kingdom by Iron Era and towed in to Dover, Kent.
Twendre Brodre	Sweden	The ship foundered in the Atlantic Ocean. Her crew survived. She was on a voyage from Liverpool to Gibraltar.
USS Wabash	United States Navy	The Colorado-class frigate ran aground at Livorno, Grand Duchy of Tuscany. She was refloated with assistance from a British steamship.
William	United Kingdom	The galiot was abandoned in the North Sea. She was discovered off Scarborough, Yorkshire on 3 April by the fishing boat Johanna Cornelius (Netherlands) and towed in to Grimsby, Lincolnshire.
Wolga	Russia	The ship was abandoned in the Norwegian Sea before 3 April. Her crew were rescued.
