= List of ships built by Hall, Russell & Company (201–300) =

List of ships built by Aberdeen shipbuilders Hall, Russell & Company, from yard number 201 to 300.

The ships built in the sequence 201 to 300 cover the period 1876 to 1896. The majority of vessels built during this period were smaller cargo vessels, such as those built for the North of Scotland, Orkney & Shetland Steam Navigation Company, that would go on to become a regular customer of the yard. Notable vessels during this period include the Zafiro, the first steel vessel built by the yard and the Balgairn, which was wrecked two days into its delivery voyage to Cardiff.

List of Hall, Russell & Company built ships (201–300)
Name	Image	Yard Number	Construction	Type	Year	Length Overall	Breadth	Depth	Tonnage	Ref(s)
Ben Nevis		201	Iron	Tug (Paddle)	1876	121 feet 4 inches (36.98 m)	12 feet 1 inch (3.68 m)	11 feet (3.4 m)	180 long tons (180 t)	
Ben Lomond	Ben Lomond as Burmah	202	Iron	Tug (Paddle)	1876	121 feet 4 inches (36.98 m)	12 feet 1 inch (3.68 m)	11 feet (3.4 m)	180 long tons (180 t)	
Petrel		203	Iron	Cargo Steamer	1876	216 feet 6 inches (65.99 m)	28 feet 1 inch (8.56 m)	13 feet 8 inches (4.17 m)	841 long tons (854 t)	
Banchory		204		Cargo Steamer	1877	174 feet 8 inches (53.24 m)	26 feet 1 inch (7.95 m)	14 feet 5 inches (4.39 m)	372 long tons (378 t)	
Adelaide		205	Iron	Tug (Paddle)	1877	141 feet 4 inches (43.08 m)	22 feet 4 inches (6.81 m)	10 feet 6 inches (3.20 m)	255 long tons (259 t)	
Euclid		206		Cargo Steamer	1877	277 feet (84 m)	32 feet 7 inches (9.93 m)	17 feet 7 inches (5.36 m)	1,545 long tons (1,570 t)	
Spey		207	Iron	Cargo Steamer	1877	125 feet 4 inches (38.20 m)	20 feet 7 inches (6.27 m)	10 feet 6 inches (3.20 m)	280 long tons (280 t)	
Kwang Tung		208	Iron	Cargo Steamer	1877	220 feet 3 inches (67.13 m)	31 feet 3 inches (9.53 m)	14 feet 2 inches (4.32 m)	1,055 long tons (1,072 t)	
Balmoral		209	Iron	Cargo Steamer	1878	220 feet 7 inches (67.23 m)	29 feet 1 inch (8.86 m)	16 feet (4.9 m)	979 long tons (995 t)	
Benamin		210	Iron	Cargo Steamer	1878	150 feet 2 inches (45.77 m)	23 feet 2 inches (7.06 m)	13 feet (4.0 m)	381 long tons (387 t)	
Birkhall		211		Cargo Steamer	1878	250 feet 7 inches (76.38 m)	32 feet 1 inch (9.78 m)	17 feet 4 inches (5.28 m)	1,447 long tons (1,470 t)	
Diamante		212	Iron	Cargo Steamer	1878	220 feet 6 inches (67.21 m)	28 feet 1 inch (8.56 m)	13 feet 6 inches (4.11 m)	809 long tons (822 t)	
Ben Ledi		213	Iron	Tug (Paddle)	1878	90 feet 3 inches (27.51 m)	18 feet 7 inches (5.66 m)	10 feet 3 inches (3.12 m)	114 long tons (116 t)	
Ballogie		214	Iron	Cargo Steamer	1879	220 feet 4 inches (67.16 m)	29 feet 7 inches (9.02 m)	16 feet 7 inches (5.05 m)	974 long tons (990 t)	
Grandholm		215	Iron	Cargo Steamer	1879	150 feet (46 m)	22 feet 1 inch (6.73 m)	12 feet (3.7 m)	369 long tons (375 t)	
Auchintoul		216	Iron	Cargo Steamer	1880	260 feet (79 m)	34 feet 2 inches (10.41 m)	23 feet 2 inches (7.06 m)	1,518 long tons (1,542 t)	
Fokien		217	Iron	Cargo Steamer	1880	200 feet 6 inches (61.11 m)	28 feet 7 inches (8.71 m)	13 feet 1 inch (3.99 m)	814 long tons (827 t)	
Ardoe		218	Iron	Cargo Steamer	1880	243 feet 4 inches (74.17 m)	32 feet 7 inches (9.93 m)	17 feet 3 inches (5.26 m)	1,388 long tons (1,410 t)	
Unknown		219		Launch	1880	50 feet 1 inch (15.27 m)	10 feet 6 inches (3.20 m)	5 feet 3 inches (1.60 m)		
Ballochbuie		220		Cargo Steamer	1880	190 feet 6 inches (58.06 m)	31 feet 1 inch (9.47 m)	13 feet (4.0 m)	677 long tons (688 t)	
Benabourd		221		Cargo Steamer	1881	190 feet 6 inches (58.06 m)	31 feet 1 inch (9.47 m)	13 feet (4.0 m)	680 long tons (690 t)	
Austerlitz		222	Iron	Cargo Steamer	1881	261 feet (80 m)	35 feet 1 inch (10.69 m)	19 feet 1 inch (5.82 m)	1,653 long tons (1,680 t)	
Goval		223	Iron	Cargo Steamer	1881	160 feet 5 inches (48.90 m)	23 feet 1 inch (7.04 m)	12 feet 3 inches (3.73 m)	443 long tons (450 t)	
Fooksang		224		Cargo Steamer	1881	250 feet 7 inches (76.38 m)	35 feet 1 inch (10.69 m)	15 feet 1 inch (4.60 m)	1,557 long tons (1,582 t)	
Douglas		225	Iron	Cargo Steamer	1881	250 feet 7 inches (76.38 m)	34 feet 1 inch (10.39 m)	16 feet 3 inches (4.95 m)	1,566 long tons (1,591 t)	
Balgairn		226	Iron	Cargo Steamer	1882	320 feet 10 inches (97.79 m)	38 feet 10 inches (11.84 m)	28 feet 1 inch (8.56 m)	2,577 long tons (2,618 t)	
Dabulamanzi		227		Cargo Steamer	1882	261 feet (80 m)	35 feet 1 inch (10.69 m)	24 feet 7 inches (7.49 m)	1,537 long tons (1,562 t)	
Balnacraig		228		Cargo Steamer	1883	250 feet 7 inches (76.38 m)	34 feet 1 inch (10.39 m)	25 feet 1 inch (7.65 m)	1,629 long tons (1,655 t)	
Aberdour		229	Iron	Cargo Steamer	1883	250 feet 7 inches (76.38 m)	34 feet 1 inch (10.39 m)	17 feet 10 inches (5.44 m)	1,519 long tons (1,543 t)	
Wing Sang		230	Iron	Cargo Steamer	1883	290 feet 5 inches (88.52 m)	40 feet 2 inches (12.24 m)	20 feet 4 inches (6.20 m)	2,339 long tons (2,377 t)	
St. Rognvald		231	Iron	Passenger and Cargo	1883	240 feet (73 m)	31 feet (9.4 m)	15 feet (4.6 m)	920 long tons (930 t)	
Grip Fast		232	Iron	Cargo Steamer	1883	200 feet (61 m)	28 feet 1 inch (8.56 m)	15 feet (4.6 m)	860 long tons (870 t)	
Churchill		233	Iron	Tug (Twin Screw)	1883	115 feet 3 inches (35.13 m)	22 feet 1 inch (6.73 m)	10 feet 10 inches (3.30 m)	194 long tons (197 t)	
Ardmellie		234	Iron	Cargo Steamer	1884	250 feet 7 inches (76.38 m)	34 feet 1 inch (10.39 m)	17 feet 10 inches (5.44 m)	1,518 long tons (1,542 t)	
Dee		235	Iron	Cargo Steamer	1884	160 feet 5 inches (48.90 m)	23 feet 7 inches (7.19 m)	12 feet 3 inches (3.73 m)	472 long tons (480 t)	
Zafiro	USNC Zafiro	236	Steel	Passenger and Cargo	1884	213 feet 7 inches (65.10 m)	32 feet 6 inches (9.91 m)	21 feet 3 inches (6.48 m)	1,141 long tons (1,159 t)	
Grandholm		237	Iron	Cargo Steamer	1884	242 feet 7 inches (73.94 m)	32 feet 7 inches (9.93 m)	17 feet 1 inch (5.21 m)	1,408 long tons (1,431 t)	
Gleneagles		238	Iron	Trawler, Cargo and Salvage	1884	135 feet 9 inches (41.38 m)	23 feet 3 inches (7.09 m)	11 feet 3 inches (3.43 m)	217 long tons (220 t)	
Seagull		239	Steel	Cargo Steamer (Paddle)	1885	228 feet 7 inches (69.67 m)	30 feet 6 inches (9.30 m)	12 feet 9 inches (3.89 m)	710 long tons (720 t)	
St. Clement		240	Iron	Trawler - Steam	1885	115 feet 3 inches (35.13 m)	21 feet 1 inch (6.43 m)	11 feet 1 inch (3.38 m)	165 long tons (168 t)	
Matabele		241	Iron	Cargo Steamer	1885	250 feet 3 inches (76.28 m)	35 feet 2 inches (10.72 m)	15 feet 5 inches (4.70 m)	1,618 long tons (1,644 t)	
Gloamin		242		Cargo Steamer	1886	250 feet 7 inches (76.38 m)	34 feet 1 inch (10.39 m)	26 feet (7.9 m)	1,541 long tons (1,566 t)	
Choy Sang		243	Steel	Cargo Steamer	1888	266 feet 4 inches (81.18 m)	33 feet 8 inches (10.26 m)	18 feet 1 inch (5.51 m)	1,800 long tons (1,800 t)	
St. Sunniva		244	Steel	Passenger and Cargo	1887	227 feet 7 inches (69.37 m)	29 feet 7 inches (9.02 m)	22 feet 11 inches (6.99 m)	966 long tons (982 t)	
Oithona		245		Cargo Steamer	1887	205 feet 6 inches (62.64 m)	27 feet 7 inches (8.41 m)	16 feet (4.9 m)	701 long tons (712 t)	
Cruiser		246		Launch	1887	45 feet 1 inch (13.74 m)	9 feet 6 inches (2.90 m)	5 feet 3 inches (1.60 m)	15 long tons (15 t)	
Inanda		247	Steel	Cargo Steamer	1888	271 feet (83 m)	35 feet 1 inch (10.69 m)	24 feet 11 inches (7.59 m)	1,758 long tons (1,786 t)	
North Sea		248		Trawler - Steam	1888	95 feet 3 inches (29.03 m)	19 feet 7 inches (5.97 m)	10 feet 9 inches (3.28 m)	121 long tons (123 t)	
Earl of Aberdeen		249		Passenger and Cargo	1889	210 feet (64 m)	30 feet 2 inches (9.19 m)	14 feet 8 inches (4.47 m)	1,765 long tons (1,793 t)	
Alford		250	Steel	Cargo Steamer	1889	270 feet 2 inches (82.35 m)	37 feet (11 m)	17 feet 8 inches (5.38 m)	1,899 long tons (1,929 t)	
Yuen Sang		251	Steel	Cargo Steamer	1889	250 feet 2 inches (76.25 m)	36 feet 2 inches (11.02 m)	16 feet 1 inch (4.90 m)	1,753 long tons (1,781 t)	
Ifafa		252	Steel	Cargo Steamer	1889	270 feet 2 inches (82.35 m)	35 feet 2 inches (10.72 m)	16 feet 7 inches (5.05 m)	1,838 long tons (1,867 t)	
North Cape		253	Steel	Trawler - Steam	1889	95 feet 3 inches (29.03 m)	19 feet 7 inches (5.97 m)	10 feet 9 inches (3.28 m)	121 long tons (123 t)	
North Pole		254	Steel	Trawler - Steam	1889	95 feet 3 inches (29.03 m)	19 feet 7 inches (5.97 m)	10 feet 9 inches (3.28 m)	121 long tons (123 t)	
Illovo		255		Cargo Steamer	1890	276 feet (84 m)	36 feet 1 inch (11.00 m)	25 feet 7 inches (7.80 m)	1,930 long tons (1,960 t)	
Duchess of Fife		256		Cargo Steamer	1890	190 feet 6 inches (58.06 m)	28 feet 1 inch (8.56 m)	15 feet (4.6 m)	671 long tons (682 t)	
Inyoni		257		Cargo Steamer	1890	276 feet (84 m)	36 feet 1 inch (11.00 m)	25 feet 7 inches (7.80 m)	1,945 long tons (1,976 t)	
Garthdee		258		Cargo Steamer	1890	190 feet 6 inches (58.06 m)	28 feet 1 inch (8.56 m)	14 feet 1 inch (4.29 m)	679 long tons (690 t)	
North East		259		Trawler - Steam	1890	95 feet 3 inches (29.03 m)	19 feet 7 inches (5.97 m)	10 feet 9 inches (3.28 m)	123 long tons (125 t)	
North West		260		Trawler - Steam	1890	95 feet 3 inches (29.03 m)	19 feet 7 inches (5.97 m)	10 feet 9 inches (3.28 m)	123 long tons (125 t)	
North Coast		261		Trawler - Steam	1890	95 feet 3 inches (29.03 m)	19 feet 7 inches (5.97 m)	10 feet 9 inches (3.28 m)	122 long tons (124 t)	
North Wind		262		Trawler - Steam	1890	95 feet 3 inches (29.03 m)	19 feet 7 inches (5.97 m)	10 feet 9 inches (3.28 m)	122 long tons (124 t)	
Goval		263	Steel	Cargo Steamer	1891	160 feet 5 inches (48.90 m)	24 feet 1 inch (7.34 m)	13 feet 1 inch (3.99 m)	462 long tons (469 t)	
Thermopylae		264	Steel	Cargo Steamer	1891	350 feet 10 inches (106.93 m)	44 feet 1 inch (13.44 m)	33 feet 1 inch (10.08 m)	3,711 long tons (3,771 t)	
North Breeze		265	Steel	Trawler - Steam	1891	95 feet 6 inches (29.11 m)	19 feet 4 inches (5.89 m)	9 feet 7 inches (2.92 m)	113 long tons (115 t)	
Induna		266	Steel	Cargo Steamer	1891	190 feet 6 inches (58.06 m)	28 feet 5 inches (8.66 m)	11 feet 2 inches (3.40 m)	678 long tons (689 t)	
Strathdon		267		Trawler - Steam	1891	102 feet 3 inches (31.17 m)	20 feet 1 inch (6.12 m)	11 feet 7 inches (3.53 m)	155 long tons (157 t)	
Strathtay		268		Trawler - Steam	1891	102 feet 3 inches (31.17 m)	20 feet 1 inch (6.12 m)	11 feet 7 inches (3.53 m)	155 long tons (157 t)	
Retriever		269	Steel	Trawler - Steam	1892	102 feet 2 inches (31.14 m)	21 feet 7 inches (6.58 m)	11 feet (3.4 m)	138 long tons (140 t)	
Hildebrand		270	Steel	Passenger and Cargo	1893	261 feet (80 m)	36 feet 1 inch (11.00 m)	25 feet (7.6 m)	1,947 long tons (1,978 t)	
St. Ola		271	Steel	Passenger and Cargo	1892	135 feet 5 inches (41.28 m)	22 feet 1 inch (6.73 m)	11 feet (3.4 m)	231 long tons (235 t)	
Collynie		272	Steel	Cargo - Coaster	1892	130 feet 4 inches (39.73 m)	20 feet 7 inches (6.27 m)	11 feet (3.4 m)	272 long tons (276 t)	
St. Giles		273	Steel	Passenger and Cargo	1892	160 feet (49 m)	25 feet (7.6 m)	12 feet (3.7 m)	407 long tons (414 t)	
Bendigo		274	Steel	Trawler - Steam	1892	121 feet (37 m)	20 feet 5 inches (6.22 m)	10 feet 4 inches (3.15 m)	188 long tons (191 t)	
Hogarth		275		Passenger and Cargo	1893	253 feet (77 m)	32 feet 7 inches (9.93 m)	17 feet 6 inches (5.33 m)	1,226 long tons (1,246 t)	
Nightingale		276	Steel	Liner (Fishing)	1893	86 feet 3 inches (26.29 m)	19 feet 1 inch (5.82 m)	9 feet 3 inches (2.82 m)	97 long tons (99 t)	
Hubert		277		Passenger and Cargo	1894	261 feet (80 m)	36 feet 1 inch (11.00 m)	25 feet (7.6 m)	1,922 long tons (1,953 t)	
Belcher		278		Trawler - Steam	1893	100 feet 3 inches (30.56 m)	20 feet 7 inches (6.27 m)	10 feet 9 inches (3.28 m)	148 long tons (150 t)	
North Briton		279	Steel	Liner (Fishing)	1894	86 feet 3 inches (26.29 m)	19 feet 1 inch (5.82 m)	9 feet 3 inches (2.82 m)	97 long tons (99 t)	
North American		280	Steel	Liner (Fishing)	1894	86 feet 3 inches (26.29 m)	19 feet 1 inch (5.82 m)	9 feet 3 inches (2.82 m)	97 long tons (99 t)	
John Brown		281	Steel	Trawler - Steam	1894	102 feet 4 inches (31.19 m)	21 feet 6 inches (6.55 m)	10 feet 9 inches (3.28 m)	161 long tons (164 t)	
Greyfriars		282	Steel	Cargo Steamer	1894	240 feet (73 m)	34 feet 2 inches (10.41 m)	14 feet 6 inches (4.42 m)	1,317 long tons (1,338 t)	
Inchanga		283	Steel	Cargo Steamer	1895	288 feet 2 inches (87.83 m)	39 feet 2 inches (11.94 m)	17 feet 5 inches (5.31 m)	2,197 long tons (2,232 t)	
Strathspey		284	Steel	Trawler - Steam	1894	102 feet 5 inches (31.22 m)	21 feet 7 inches (6.58 m)	11 feet (3.4 m)	155 long tons (157 t)	
Strathisla		285		Trawler - Steam	1894	102 feet 3 inches (31.17 m)	21 feet 7 inches (6.58 m)	11 feet 7 inches (3.53 m)	163 long tons (166 t)	
Norwood		286	Steel	Cargo Steamer	1895	220 feet 8 inches (67.26 m)	30 feet 2 inches (9.19 m)	15 feet 1 inch (4.60 m)	798 long tons (811 t)	
Bentley		287	Steel	Trawler - Steam	1895	181 feet 1 inch (55.19 m)	20 feet 9 inches (6.32 m)	10 feet 3 inches (3.12 m)	152 long tons (154 t)	
Frigate Bird		288	Steel	Liner (Fishing)	1895	85 feet 5 inches (26.04 m)	19 feet 2 inches (5.84 m)	10 feet 2 inches (3.10 m)	101 long tons (103 t)	
Betty Inglis		289	Steel	Liner (Fishing)	1895	90 feet (27 m)	19 feet 6 inches (5.94 m)	10 feet (3.0 m)	104 long tons (106 t)	
Diamante		290	Steel	Cargo Steamer	1899	260 feet 3 inches (79.32 m)	37 feet 2 inches (11.33 m)	17 feet 3 inches (5.26 m)	1,955 long tons (1,986 t)	
C		291		Lighter (barge)	1895	120 feet 4 inches (36.68 m)	26 feet 1 inch (7.95 m)	8 feet 6 inches (2.59 m)	250 long tons (250 t)	
D		292		Lighter (barge)	1895	120 feet 4 inches (36.68 m)	26 feet 1 inch (7.95 m)	8 feet 6 inches (2.59 m)	250 long tons (250 t)	
King Sing		293	Steel	Passenger and Cargo	1895	261 feet (80 m)	38 feet 1 inch (11.61 m)	22 feet 9 inches (6.93 m)	1,983 long tons (2,015 t)	
Eleazar		294		Liner (Fishing)	1895	90 feet 3 inches (27.51 m)	19 feet 7 inches (5.97 m)	10 feet 6 inches (3.20 m)	111 long tons (113 t)	
Craigellachie		295	Steel	Liner (Fishing)	1896	90 feet 8 inches (27.64 m)	19 feet 6 inches (5.94 m)	10 feet (3.0 m)	112 long tons (114 t)	
Craig Gowan		296	Steel	Liner (Fishing)	1897	95 feet 6 inches (29.11 m)	19 feet 7 inches (5.97 m)	10 feet 2 inches (3.10 m)	126 long tons (128 t)	
Craigmillar		297	Steel	Liner (Fishing)	1896	91 feet 5 inches (27.86 m)	18 feet 7 inches (5.66 m)	10 feet 3 inches (3.12 m)	129 long tons (131 t)	
Cragievar		298	Steel	Liner (Fishing)	1896	90 feet 4 inches (27.53 m)	19 feet 6 inches (5.94 m)	10 feet (3.0 m)	112 long tons (114 t)	
Vineyard		299		Liner (Fishing)	1896	95 feet 3 inches (29.03 m)	19 feet 7 inches (5.97 m)	11 feet (3.4 m)	126 long tons (128 t)	
Smiling Morn		300		Liner (Fishing)	1896	95 feet 3 inches (29.03 m)	19 feet 7 inches (5.97 m)	11 feet (3.4 m)	126 long tons (128 t)	

== Notes ==
- Where available, vessel measurements taken from Lloyd's Register, giving registered length, beam and draft. Hall, Russell and Company's own measurements typically are length overall, beam and moulded depth.
- Yard Number 226 (Balgairn) wrecked 2 days after leaving Aberdeen on delivery/maiden voyage to Cardiff, and was the shortest lived ship built by Hall, Russell and Company.
