= Boris Babkin =

Russian physiologist (1877–1950)

Boris Petrovitch Babkin FRS
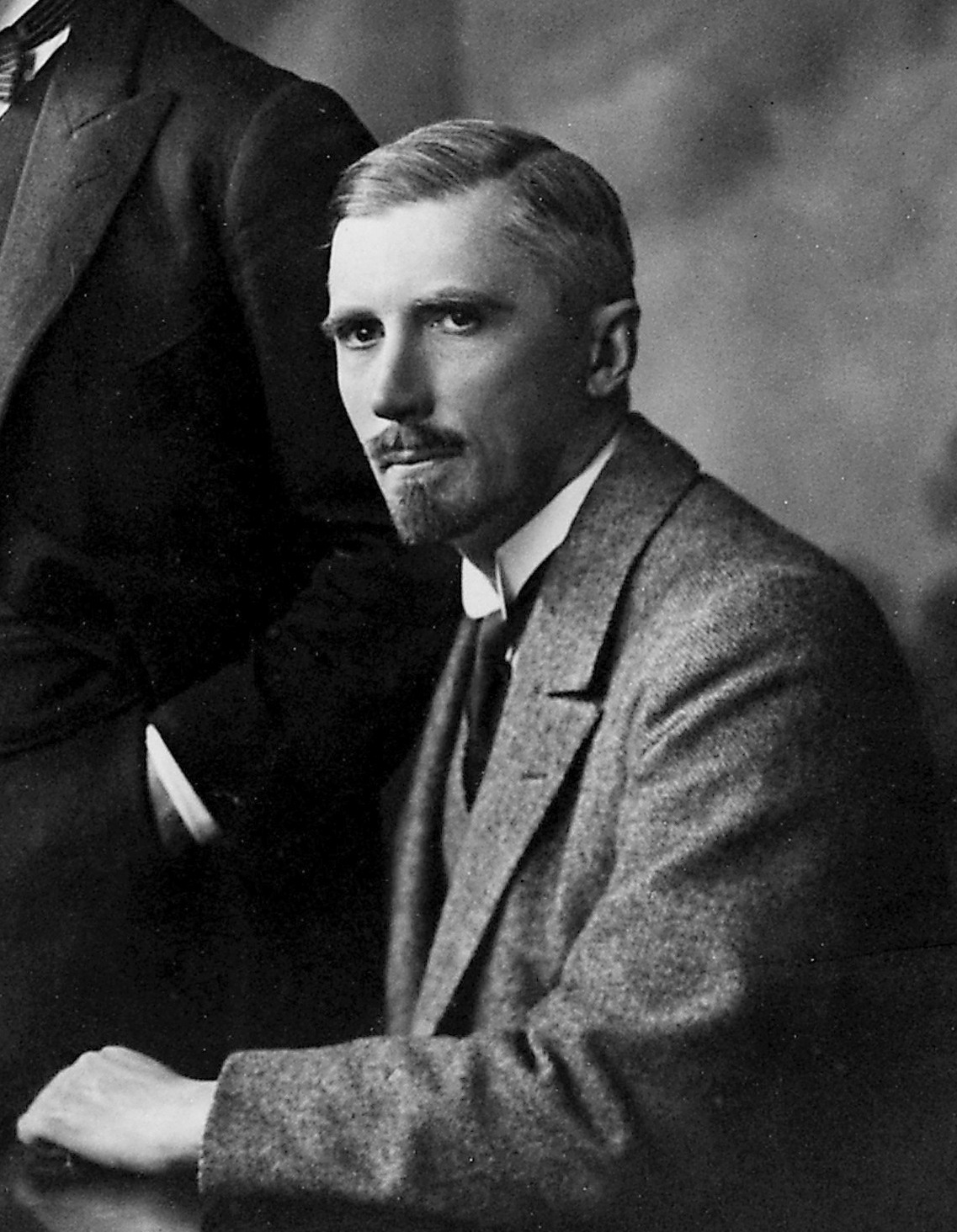
- Born: 17 January 1877
- Died: 3 May 1950 (aged 73)
- Citizenship: British
- Education: Military Medical Academy
- Known for: Babkin reflex
- Awards: FRS
- Scientific career
- Fields: Physiology
- Workplaces: McGill University

Boris Petrovitch Babkin FRS, M.D., D.Sc, LL.D (Russian: Борис Петрович Бабкин; 17 January 1877 – 3 May 1950) was a Russian-born physiologist, who worked in Russia, England, and Canada.

== Career ==
Babkin graduated from the Military Medical Academy, St. Petersburg, with a Doctor of Medicine degree in 1904. He held professorships at the Novo-Alexandria Agricultural Institute and the University of Odessa, before being imprisoned and exiled from Russia in 1922, due to his criticism of the October Revolution.

He then spent two years in England, working at University College London under Ernest Starling, before joining Dalhousie University, Nova Scotia, as Professor of Physiology.

In 1928 Babkin became a research professor at McGill University, Montreal, under John Tait, where he spent the remainder of his career. He chaired the Physiology department between 1940 and 1941, following Tait's retirement, and, following his retirement, was invited to become Research Fellow of Neurosurgery by Wilder Penfield; a position he held until his death in 1950.

In 1950, he was elected a Fellow of the Royal Society for "his work on the digestive glands, conditioned reflexes and the cortical representation of autonomically innervated organs. He demonstrated that a) the three pancreatic enzymes are secreted in parallel, b) sympathetic and parasympathetic fibres innervate different cells in the salivary glands and c) histamine stimulates exclusively gastric parietal cells. His researches not only refuted Heidenhain's theory of "secretory" and "trophic" nerves but led to the conception of the elements of the digestive glands being activated by different nerves and hormones. Author of "Die aussere Sekretion der Verdauungsdrusen" and "Secretory Mechanism of the Digestive Glands"" His personal papers are conserved at the McGill University Library in the collections of the Osler Library of the History of Medicine and the McGill University Archives.

== Honours ==
- 1904, Doctor of Medicine, Imperial Military Medical Academy
- 1924, Honorary Doctor of Science, University College London
- 1943, Honorary Doctor of Letters, Dalhousie University
- 1949, Friedenwald Medal, American Gastroenterological Association
- 1950, Fellow of the Royal Society
