= SS St. Sunniva =

History

United Kingdom
- Name: SS St. Sunniva
- Owner: North of Scotland, Orkney & Shetland Steam Navigation Company
- Builder: Hall, Russell & Company; Aberdeen, Scotland
- Launched: 24 March 1887
- Maiden voyage: 26 May 1887
- Fate: Wrecked on Mousa, Shetland 10 April 1930

General characteristics
- Tonnage: 960 GRT
- Length: 236 feet (71.9 m)
- Beam: 30 feet (9.2 m)
- Installed power: Triple expansion reciprocating engines; 189 horsepower (141 kW) @ 96 rpm
- Propulsion: single screw
- Speed: 15.5 knots (28.7 km/h; 17.8 mph)
- Capacity: 142

SS St. Sunniva was one of the first purpose-built cruise ships. Converted into a ferry in 1908, she operated as the Lerwick mail steamer until 10 April 1930, when she ran aground off Shetland and was a complete loss.

== History ==
SS St. Sunniva was ordered by the North of Scotland, Orkney & Shetland Steam Navigation Company (more commonly referred to as "The North Company") after the success of their earlier cruise vessel, the St. Rognvald. She was ordered from Hall, Russell & Company of Aberdeen for delivery in time for the 1887 season.

== Description ==
The ship was designed to resemble a classic steam yacht in form and carried a small steam launch for landing passengers when necessary.

=== Accommodation ===
The accommodation comprised 16 x two berth cabins on either side of the main deck, with a further two berth cabin and a twelve berth ladies' cabin on the centreline. A bathroom and three toilets was sited on either side of the main deck with an additional bathroom and two toilets provided for the ladies' cabin. The ladies' cabin was fitted with two washbasins and all the other main deck cabins were fitted with their own washbasin. 8 x four berth cabins were sited aft on the lower deck, each with a washbasin, and forward of the machinery space were 2 x four berth and 4 x six berth cabins with a common bathroom and two washbasins. No toilets were provided on the lower deck.

The main saloon could hold 132 people per sitting, with a piano provided for the use of the passengers, while a deckhouse aft of the mainmast held a ladies' lounge and a separate men's smoking room.

== Career ==
The St. Sunniva was a great commercial success as a cruise ship. However, in 1907–1908, the North Company reduced the number of the ship's cruises, and entirely withdrew from the market at the end of August 1908. It was subsequently decided to convert the ship into a ferry and to that end the lower deck accommodation was removed and cargo holds created. The main deck accommodation was also completely remodelled and the superstructure was extended.

Following this remodelling, the St. Sunniva entered service as a mail steamer on the Lerwick route, operating a weekly service from Leith and Aberdeen. She remained on this demanding service until 10 April 1930 when, while sailing north in fog, she ran aground on the uninhabited island of Mousa, Shetland. All passengers and crew were rescued but the ship was a complete loss.
