= John Tait (physiologist) =

Scottish physiologist (1878–1944)

John Tait (1878 – 21 October 1944) was a 20th-century Scottish physician, physiologist and medical author. He was emeritus Professor of Medicine at McGill University in Canada.

== Life ==
He was born at St Ola in Orkney in 1878. He studied medicine at the University of Edinburgh, graduating M.D. in 1906, and winning the gold medal for best in class that same year. In 1907 John Tait gained a D.Sc. He undertook postgraduate studies at Göttingen and Berlin and began lecturing in Experimental Physiology at Edinburgh in 1910. His essay on “Yohimbine : a contribution to the study of narcotic agents” was awarded the Edinburgh University Milner Fothergill Medal in Therapeutics, 1911.

In the First World War, he served in the Royal Army Medical Corps in Macedonia and Italy.

In 1917, he was elected a Fellow of the Royal Society of Edinburgh. His proposers were Sir Edward Albert Sharpey-Schafer, James Cossar Ewart, James Lorrain Smith and Cargill Gilston Knott. He won the Society's Neill Prize for 1917–1919, and resigned in 1936.

From 1919 to 1940, he was Joseph Morley Drake Professor of Physiology at McGill University. This followed a 4-year interregnum during the First World War following the premature death of Prof George Mines. He was joined in his work by W. J. McNally and Boris Babkin.

In 1938, he had a heart attack, forcing him into semi-retirement. He retired fully in 1940 and had a return trip to Scotland. His position as Professor of Physiology was filled by Babkin.

He died in Montreal on 21 October 1944.
