= P&O Scottish Ferries =

- Company type: Subsidiary
- Industry: Shipping
- Predecessor: North of Scotland, Orkney & Shetland Steam Navigation Company
- Founded: 1971
- Defunct: 30 September 2002
- Successor: NorthLink Ferries
- Headquarters: Aberdeen
- Area served: Scotland; Orkney; Shetland
- Services: Passenger transportation Freight transportation
- Revenue: £31.7 million (2001)
- Operating income: £2.3 million (2001)
- Net income: £2.1 million (2001)
- Number of employees: 410 (December 2001)
- Parent: P&O
- Website: www.poscottishferries.co.uk

P&O Scottish Ferries ran ferry services between the Scottish mainland and Orkney and Shetland from 1971 to 2002.

== History ==
P&O took over the routes from the long-established North of Scotland, Orkney & Shetland Steam Navigation Company in 1971. It branded the services P&O Ferries from 1975 to 1989 and P&O Scottish Ferries thereafter.

The services were taken over by NorthLink Ferries on 1 October 2002.

== Services ==
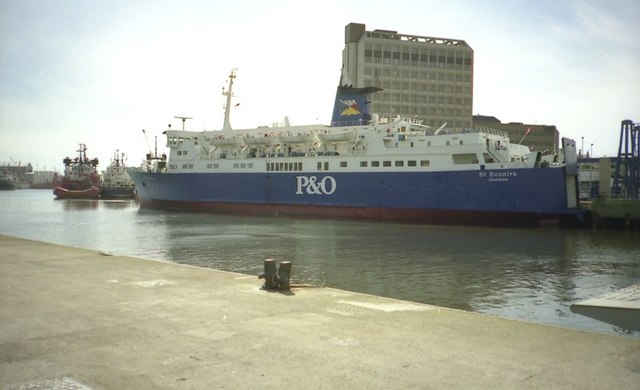
St Sunniva in Aberdeen in 1991

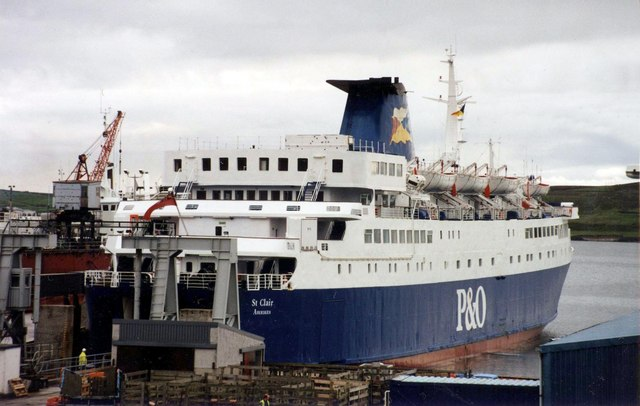
St Clair in Lerwick in 1994

P&O Scottish Ferries sailed from Aberdeen to Stromness and Lerwick, and from Scrabster to Stromness.

In keeping with the tradition of the company which preceded them on the route, their vessels were (with one or two exceptions) named after saints, such as the St Clair and the St Magnus.

== Fleet ==
At the end of operations in 2002, the company had four vessels covering the routes:

- St Ola (IV): Scrabster - Stromness
- St Sunniva (III): Aberdeen - Stromness - Lerwick
- St Clair (V): Aberdeen - Lerwick
- St Rognvald (IV): Freight services, calling at Aberdeen, Stromness, Kirkwall and Lerwick
