= North of Scotland, Orkney & Shetland Steam Navigation Company =

Scottish shipping company

North of Scotland, Orkney & Shetland Steam Navigation Co.
- Industry: Transport
- Founded: 1875
- Headquarters: Aberdeen, Scotland,
- Products: Ferries, cruises

The North of Scotland, Orkney & Shetland Steam Navigation Company, which was more usually known as The North of Scotland or The North Company, its full name rarely being used, was a UK shipping company based in Aberdeen, originally formed in 1875 from a merger of older Scottish shipping companies. The company operated most of the ferries from mainland Scotland to Orkney and Shetland, latterly as P&O Scottish Ferries until 2002, when it was replaced by NorthLink Ferries.

== History ==
=== Early history ===
In 1790, the Leith & Clyde Shipping Company operated sailing vessels between the Forth and the Clyde, round the north of Scotland and possibly calling at Orkney.

In 1820 this company joined with the Aberdeen, Dundee & Leith Shipping Company to form the Aberdeen, Leith, Clyde & Tay Shipping Company. A fleet of sailing vessels initially served towns, including Glasgow, Edinburgh, London, Rotterdam (until c.1843) and Liverpool (until 1830). The far flung routes ceased, and most effort was placed on the routes within Scotland. Their first steamer, Velocity (1821), was built to compete with the steamer Tourist which operated between Leith and Aberdeen. Services were extended to Wick (by 1833), Kirkwall and Lerwick (in 1836).

In 1875, the Aberdeen, Leith & Clyde Shipping Co became the North of Scotland, Orkney & Shetland Steam Navigation Company. The new company further expanded the fleet and introduced Norwegian cruising in 1886.

=== Norwegian cruises ===
In 1886 the St. Rognvald was advertised to make a special trip to Bergen and "some of the principal fjords and places of interest on the west coast of Norway". This was perhaps the first purposely planned cruise ship voyage and proved so popular with the public that the company quickly advertised a follow-up cruise which was also popular, leading to a further three cruises being arranged for the summer season.

The Company realised that its short duration and relatively affordable cruises were a profitable new venture and the directors quickly ordered a new purpose-built ship, the St. Sunniva, from Hall Russell of Aberdeen, to be delivered in time for the 1887 season. The St. Sunniva was the world's first purpose-built cruise ship and was a great success, so much so the St. Rognvald was obliged to carry out two cruises to accommodate the overflow of bookings.

A more ambitious cruise programme was arranged for 1888, involving the St. Rognvald carrying out a 21-day cruise to the North Cape followed by St. Sunniva to the Baltic Sea. It was also decided to extend the cruising season with an around-Britain cruise. The St. Sunniva was also chartered for cruises in the Mediterranean in the winter.

The great commercial success of the North Company's cruises had meanwhile attracted the attentions of rival companies. Wilson Line of Hull began Norwegian cruises immediately after St. Rognvald's first voyage, but the St. Sunniva far outstripped Wilsons' vessels in quality. More seriously, the Orient Steam Navigation Company entered the market in summer 1889 using two of their large Australian Mail Service ships, Chimborazo and Garonne.

In the winter of 1900 St. Rognvald was wrecked on Burgh Head, Stronsay, Orkney while carrying out one of her usual winter ferry voyages. A new vessel was ordered to replace her, omitting cruise facilities altogether as the growing quality and quantity of competition in the cruise market was becoming too great for the North Company to survive.

In 1907–1908 the North Company reduced the St. Sunniva's cruises and finally withdrew entirely from the market in 1908 when the passenger accommodation was removed. The St. Sunniva was converted into a ferry and began operation as a mail steamer. She operated a weekly service from Leith and Aberdeen to Lerwick, Shetland, with an additional Aberdeen service in the summer.

Services continued until the outbreak of World War I, when Norwegian cruising was withdrawn. The fleet was updated throughout this period as well. The company suffered requisitions through both World Wars.

=== Passenger services ===
In 1953 the North Company was reformed. Over the next 20 years it introduced roll-on/roll-off services to the North Isles to satisfy demand for faster, shorter ferry routes, rather than the old mail boats.

In 1961 the company was taken over by Coast Lines and in 1975 P&O and in 1975, renamed as P&O Ferries (Orkney & Shetland Services). In 1989 it became P&O Scottish Ferries and continued to operate until 2002, when the services were taken over by NorthLink Ferries.

== Ships ==
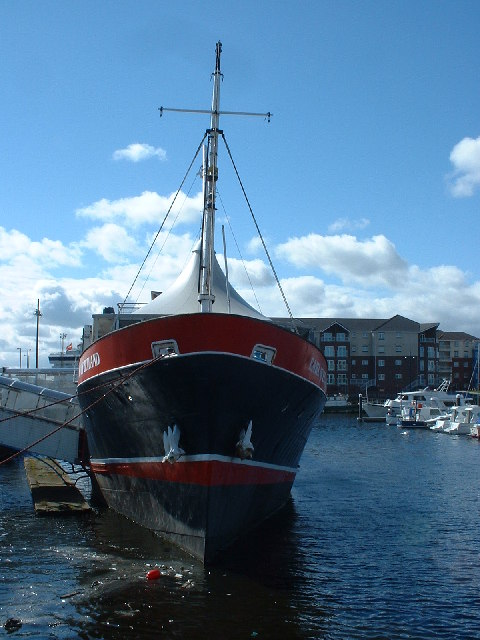
The former Shetland – Orkney ferry Earl of Zetland, now a floating restaurant

- ROF Beaver (1975–87)
- Earl of Zetland (1877–1946)
- Earl of Zetland (1939–75)
- Highlander (1939–40) renamed St. Catherine II 1940

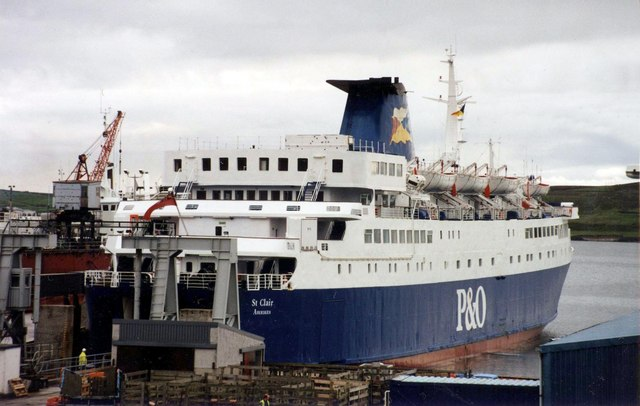
P&O ferry St Clair (V) at Lerwick, 1994. This was the Aberdeen – Lerwick ferry, built in Bremerhaven in 1971 to carry 406 passengers and 160 cars.

- St. Clair (1868-1937)
- St. Clair (1937–67) renamed St. Magnus 1960
- St. Clair (1960–77)
- St. Clair (1977–92) renamed St. Clair II 1992
- St. Clair (1992–2002)
- St. Clement (1946–76)
- St. Magnus (1867–1904)
- St. Magnus (1924–60)
- St. Magnus (1967–77)
- St. Magnus (1978–89)
- St. Margaret (1913–17)
- St. Ninian (1895–1948)
- St. Ninian (1950–71)
- St. Nicholas (1871–1914)

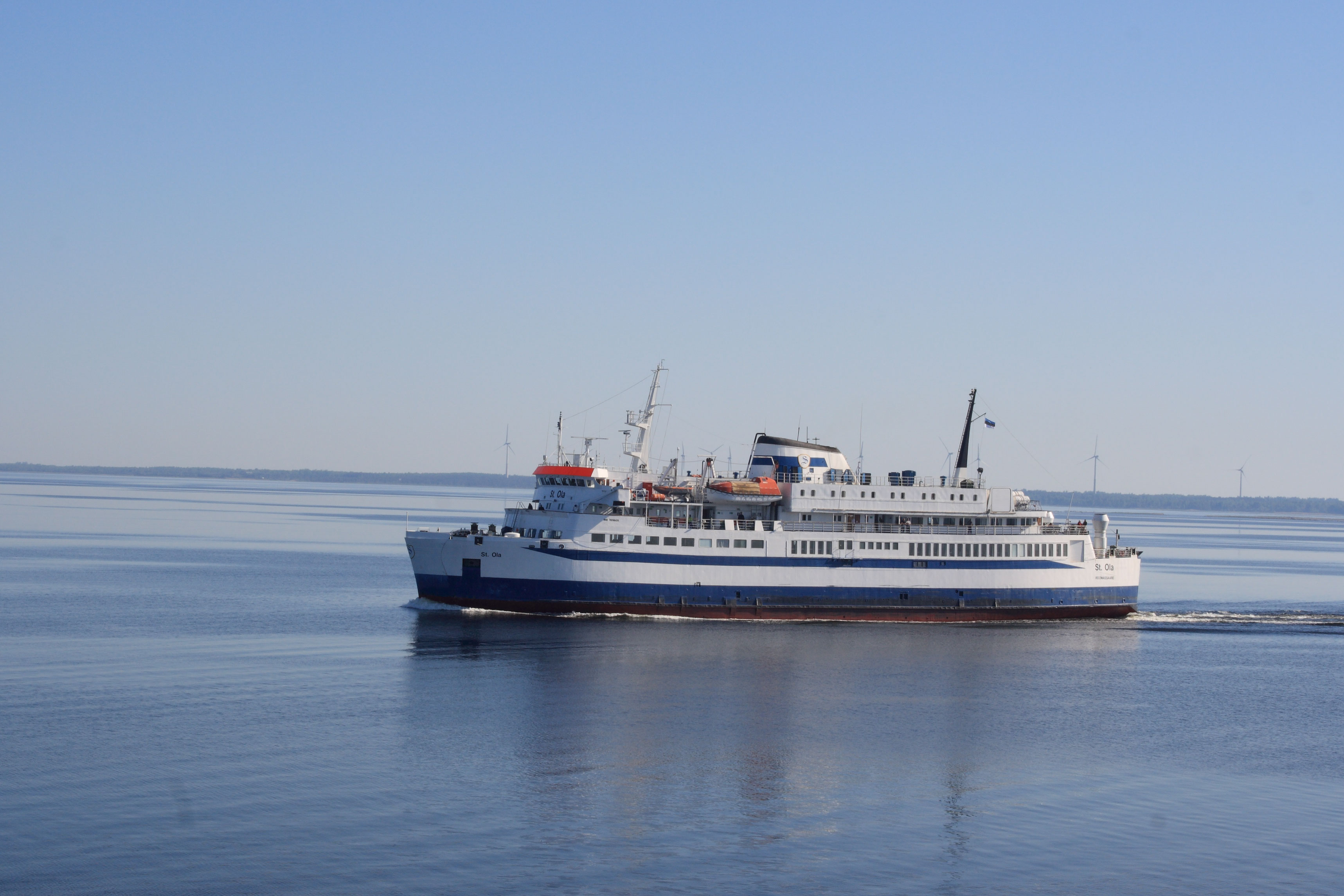
St. Ola

- St. Ola (1892–1951)
- St. Ola (1892–1974)
- St. Ola (1951–74)
- St. Ola (1974–92)
- St. Ola (1992–2002)
- St. Rognvald (1883–1900)
- St. Rognvald (1901–51)
- St. Rognvald (1955–78)
- St. Rognvald (1989–2002)

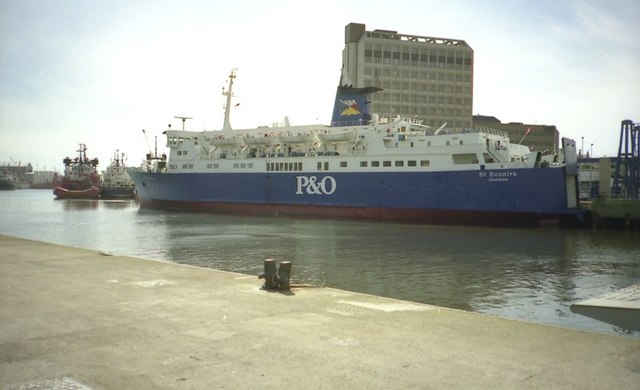
P&O Ferry St Sunniva in Aberdeen in 1991, about to leave for Shetland

- St. Sunniva (1887–1930)
- St. Sunniva (1931–43)
- St. Sunniva (1987–2002)
