= SS St. Nicholas =

Catastrophic boiler explosion, April 1859

The SS St. Nicholas was a Mississippi River steamboat that suffered a catastrophic boiler explosion on April 24, 1859, near Island 60 or St. Francis Island. The death toll was believed to be between 45 and 75.

In January 1859, a sidewheeler steamboat called St. Nicholas may have transported captives from the Wanderer (illegal slave ship) from Montgomery down the Alabama River.
