= Aberdeenshire Council elections =

Local government elections in Aberdeen, Scotland

Aberdeenshire Council in Scotland holds elections every five years, previously holding them every four years from its creation in 1995 to 2007.

== Council elections ==
Year	Conservative	SNP	Liberal Democrats	Labour	Green	Independent
1995	4	15	15	0	0	13
1999 (Note: New ward boundaries.)	7	23	28	0	0	10
2003	11	18	28	0	0	11
2007 (Note: Change to single transferable vote system and new ward boundaries.)	14	22	24	0	0	8
2012	14	28	12	2	1	11
2017 (Note: New ward boundaries.)	23	21	14	1	1	10
2022	26	21	14	0	0	9

== Results maps ==
1999 results map

2003 results map

2007 results map

2012 results map

2017 results map

2022 results map

== By-elections ==
=== 2003-2007 ===
Huntley East By-Election 9 June 2005
Party	Candidate	Votes	%	±%
Conservative	Moira Ingleby	419	34.3	−0.9
Liberal Democrats	Eleanor Anderson	360	29.5	−2.2
SNP	Robert Ness	224	18.3	−4.5
Independent	Hamish Jolly	181	14.8	+14.8
Labour	Bryan Begg	38	3.1	−7.2
Majority		59	4.8	
Turnout		1,222		
Conservative hold		Swing		

=== 2007-2012 ===
Troup By-Election 1 May 2008
Party	Candidate	FPv%	Count
Party	Candidate	FPv%	1
SNP	Bob Watson	62.8	1,721
Conservative	Lisa Watt	18.8	515
Liberal Democrats	Edward Acton	18.4	503
SNP hold			
Valid: 2,739 Spoilt: 16 Quota: 1,371 Turnout: 2,755

Aboyne, Upper Deeside and Donside By-Election 23 April 2009
Party	Candidate	FPv%	Count				
Party	Candidate	FPv%	1	2	3	4	5
Liberal Democrats	Rosemary Bruce	26.7	969	975	981	1,180	1,566
Conservative	Jo Pick	31.5	1,144	1,148	1,152	1,241	1,468
Independent	William Forbes	23.2	842	845	855	1,003	
SNP	George Parkinson	17.0	617	621	636		
BNP	Roy Jones	1.2	44	44			
Independent	David Hutchison	0.5	19				
Liberal Democrats gain from Conservative							
Valid: 3,635 Spoilt: 20 Quota: 1,819 Turnout: 3,655

=== 2012-2017 ===
Troup By-Election 27 November 2014
Party	Candidate	FPv%	Count					
Party	Candidate	FPv%	1	2	3	4	5	6
SNP	Ross Cassie	46.1	1,159	1,162	1,183	1,205	1,244	1,352
Conservative	Iain Taylor	22.8	574	580	588	604	645	718
Independent	Alan Still	15.5	391	408	415	423	446	
Liberal Democrats	Ann Bell	5.6	141	141	149	180		
Labour	Alan Duffill	5.6	140	142	148			
Green	Darren Duncan	2.7	68	69				
Independent	Philip Mitchell	1.7%	43					
SNP gain from Conservative								
Valid: 2,516 Spoilt: 25 Quota: 1,259 Turnout: 2,541

Huntly, Strathbogie and Howe of Alford By-Election 5 November 2015
Party	Candidate	FPv%	Count
Party	Candidate	FPv%	1
Conservative	Margo Stewart	36.3	1,469
SNP	Gwyneth Petrie	35.4	1,433
Liberal Democrats	David Millican	22.9	928
Labour	Sarah Flavell	4.8	196
Scottish Libertarian	Derek Scott	0.5	20
Conservative gain from Liberal Democrats			
SNP hold			
Valid: 4,046 Spoilt: 50 Quota: 1,349 Turnout: 4,096

Banff and District By-election 3 November 2016
Party	Candidate	FPv%	Count	
Party	Candidate	FPv%	1	2
Conservative	Iain Taylor	44.0	1,170	1,378
SNP	Glen Reynolds	36.2	962	1,097
Liberal Democrats	Alistair Mason	19.8	526	
Conservative gain from SNP				
Valid: 2,658 Spoilt: 26 Quota: 1,330 Turnout: 2,684

Inverurie and District By-Election 3 November 2016
Party	Candidate	FPv%	Count		
Party	Candidate	FPv%	1	2	3
Conservative	Colin Clark	38.8	1,302	1,319	1,701
SNP	Neil Baillie	34.6	1,164	1,192	1,341
Liberal Democrats	Alison Auld	22.5	755	795	
Labour	Sarah Flavell	4.1	139		
Conservative gain from Liberal Democrats					
Valid: 3,360 Spoilt: 18 Quota: 1,681 Turnout: 3,378

=== 2017-2022 ===
Inverurie and District By-Election 12 October 2017
Party	Candidate	FPv%	Count			
Party	Candidate	FPv%	1	2	3	4
Conservative	Lesley Berry	48.5	1,672	1,679	1,715	1,871
SNP	Elaine Mitchell	33.3	1,146	1,161	1,234	1,300
Liberal Democrats	Scott Bremner	8.6	295	309	412	
Labour	Sarah Flavell	8.0	276	290		
Green	Craig Stewart	1.6	56			
Conservative hold						
Valid: 3,445 Spoilt: 26 Quota: 1,723 Turnout: 3,471

Ellon and District By-Election 15 October 2020
Party	Candidate	FPv%	Count			
Party	Candidate	FPv%	1	2	3	4
SNP	Louise Mcallister	42.4	1,683	1,725	1,757	1,916
Conservative	John Crawley	41.7	1,658	1,663	1,679	1,840
Liberal Democrats	Trevor Mason	10.2	405	443	485	
Labour	John Bennett	2.9	114	126		
Green	Peter Kennedy	2.8	112			
SNP hold						
Valid: 3,972 Spoilt: 34 Quota: 1,987 Turnout: 4,006

East Garioch By-Election 17 June 2021
Party	Candidate	FPv%	Count			
Party	Candidate	FPv%	1	2	3	4
Conservative	David Keating	45.5	1,240	1,261	1,268	1,394
SNP	Dan Ritchie	35.3	963	982	1,058	1,146
Liberal Democrats	Trevor Mason	10.3	281	319	365	
Green	Jamie Ogilvie	4.8	130	143		
Labour	Andy Brown	4.1	111			
Conservative gain from Liberal Democrats						
Valid: 2,725 Spoilt: 15 Quota: 1,363 Turnout: 2,740

Mid-Formartine By-Election 19 August 2021
Party	Candidate	FPv%	Count		
Party	Candidate	FPv%	1	2	3
Conservative	Sheila Powell	45.7	1,480	1,484	1,645
SNP	Jenny Nicol	37.2	1,205	1,281	1,409
Liberal Democrats	Jeff Goodhall	12.7	412	451	
Green	Peter Kennedy	4.4	144		
Conservative gain from SNP					
Valid: 3,241 Quota: 1,621

=== 2022-2027 ===
Central Buchan By-Election 7 November 2024
Party	Candidate	FPv%	Count				
Party	Candidate	FPv%	1	2	3	4	5
Conservative	Peter Chapman	41.3	1,260	1,272	1,292	1,430	1,614
SNP	Sarah Wilken	28.5	869	879	897	925	1,069
Liberal Democrats	Ian Bailey	14.3	435	452	463	507	
Reform	Andrew Curwen	10.8	331	338	358		
Scottish Family	Phil Reynolds	2.7	83	89			
Independent	Dean Ward	2.3	71				
Conservative gain from SNP							
Valid: 3,049 Quota: 1,525 Turnout: 3,076

Fraserburgh and District By-Election 7 November 2024
Party	Candidate	FPv%	Count				
Party	Candidate	FPv%	1	2	3	4	5
Conservative	Iain Sutherland	36.3	1,145	1,158	1,225	1,556	1,884
SNP	Mike McDonald	28.4	895	915	966	1,113	
Reform	Conrad Ritchie	25.9	817	829	864		
Liberal Democrats	Sandy Leslie	7.0	222	233			
Scottish Family	Dawn Smith	2.2	71				
Conservative hold							
Valid: 3,150 Quota: 1,576 Turnout: 3,174

Mearns by-election 7 November 2024
Party	Candidate	FPv%	Count			
Party	Candidate	FPv%	1	2	3	4
Conservative	Tracey Smith	39.2	1,347	1,350	1,494	1,768
SNP	Hannah Scott	24.0	823	891	928	1,181
Liberal Democrats	Isobel Knights	21.7	745	788	851	
Reform	Claudia Leith	10.9	375	384		
Green	William Linegar	4.0	136			
Conservative gain from SNP						
Valid: 3,435 Quota: 1,718 Turnout: 3,457

Mearns by-election 7 November 2024
Party	Candidate	FPv%	Count			
Party	Candidate	FPv%	1	2	3	4
Conservative	Tracey Smith	39.2	1,347	1,350	1,494	1,768
SNP	Hannah Scott	24.0	823	891	928	1,181
Liberal Democrats	Isobel Knights	21.7	745	788	851	
Reform	Claudia Leith	10.9	375	384		
Green	William Linegar	4.0	136			
Conservative gain from SNP						
Valid: 3,435 Quota: 1,718 Turnout: 3,457

Peterhead South and Cruden by-election 2 July 2026
Party	Candidate	FPv%	Count						
Party	Candidate	FPv%	1	2	3	4	5	6	7
SNP	Angus Matheson	36.5	741	749	763	783	828	889	1,052
Conservative	Ross Gibb	21.3	432	443	453	473	520	718	
Reform	Andy Curwen	22.9	465	470	472	485	516		
Independent	John Ross	7.4	150	161	178	228			
Independent	Ross Thomson	6.5	132	137	141				
Liberal Democrats	Tony Ware	2.8	56	58					
Scottish Family	Dave Bestwick	2.7	54						
SNP gain from Conservative									
Valid: 2,030 Quota: 1,016 Turnout: 2,043
