= Gordon and Buchan =

UK Parliament constituency (since 2024)

- County constituency for the House of Commons
- Interactive map of boundaries from 2024
- Location within Scotland
- Subdivision: Aberdeenshire
- Electorate: 70,238 (March 2020)
- Major settlements: Kintore, Inverurie, Huntly, Ellon, Oldmeldrum

Current constituency
- Created: 2024
- Member of Parliament: Harriet Cross (Conservative)
- Seats: One
- Created from: Banff and Buchan & Gordon

Gordon and Buchan is a constituency in Aberdeenshire represented in the House of Commons of the UK Parliament. Following the 2023 review of Westminster constituencies, it was first contested at the 2024 general election. It has been represented since then by Harriet Cross of the Scottish Conservatives; she defeated Richard Thomson of the Scottish National Party (SNP), who was the MP for the predecessor constituency of Gordon from 2019 to 2024.

The constituency name refers to the former Scottish districts of Gordon and Buchan.

== Boundaries ==
The constituency comprises the following wards or part wards of Aberdeenshire Council:

- In full: Turriff and District, Mid Formartine, Ellon and District, Inverurie and District.
- In part: Central Buchan (minority, comprising southwestern areas), West Garioch^{1} (majority, excluding Kemnay), East Garioch^{1} (majority, excluding Blackburn), Huntly, Strathbogie and Howe of Alford^{1} (majority, excluding Alford).

^{1} The boundary within these wards is equivalent to the boundary between the former Gordon constituency and the unchanged West Aberdeenshire and Kincardine constituency.

The seat is made up of those parts of the abolished constituency of Gordon which were in Aberdeenshire Council plus a minority of the abolished Banff and Buchan constituency (inland areas including Turriff).

== Members of Parliament ==
Election	Member	Party
2024	Harriet Cross	Scottish Conservative

== Elections ==
=== Elections in the 2020s ===
General election 2024: Gordon and Buchan
Party	Candidate	Votes	%	±%
Conservative	Harriet Cross	14,418	32.9	−13.1
SNP	Richard Thomson	13,540	30.9	−8.3
Liberal Democrats	Conrad Wood	7,307	16.7	+5.4
Labour	Nurul Hoque Ali	4,686	10.7	+7.2
Reform	Kris Callander	3,897	8.9	N/A
Rejected ballots		166		
Majority		878	2.0	
Turnout		43,848	63.0	
Conservative hold		Swing	−2.4	

=== Elections in the 2010s (notional) ===
2019 notional result (Note: Estimate of the 2019 general election result as if the revised boundaries recommended under the 2023 boundary review were in place)
Party	Vote	%
Conservative	21,874	46.0
SNP	18,650	39.2
Liberal Democrats	5,401	11.3
Labour	1,666	3.5
Majority	3,224	6.8
Turnout	47,591	67.8
Electorate	70,238	
