= Aberdeenshire North and Moray East =

UK Parliament constituency (since 2024)

- County constituency for the House of Commons
- Interactive map of boundaries from 2024
- Boundary of Aberdeenshire North and Moray East in Scotland
- Subdivision: Aberdeenshire and Moray
- Electorate: 71,485 (March 2020)

Current constituency
- Created: 2024
- Member of Parliament: Seamus Logan (SNP)
- Seats: One
- Created from: Banff and Buchan & Moray

Aberdeenshire North and Moray East is a constituency of the House of Commons in the UK Parliament. Following the completion of the 2023 review of Westminster constituencies, it was first contested at the 2024 general election, since which time Seamus Logan of the Scottish National Party has served as its Member of Parliament.

== Boundaries ==
The constituency comprises the following:

- In full: the Aberdeenshire Council wards of Banff and District, Troup, Fraserburgh and District, Peterhead North and Rattray, Peterhead South and Cruden; and the Moray Council wards of Keith and Cullen, and Buckie.
- In part: the Aberdeenshire Council ward of Central Buchan (majority, comprising northeastern areas); and the Moray Council ward of Fochabers Lhanbryde (to the east of the River Spey).

The areas in Aberdeenshire Council, comprising the bulk of the seat, were previously part of the abolished Banff and Buchan constituency; the areas in Moray Council were previously part of the abolished constituency of Moray.

== History ==
Following a significant illness and period in hospital, David Duguid, the incumbent MP for the constituency's predecessor Banff and Buchan, was informed that he had not been selected as the Conservative candidate on the evening of 5 June 2024. This was despite having been previously selected by his local constituency association and indicating he was fit to stand.

Although he had previously said that he was stepping down from Westminster, Scottish Conservatives leader Douglas Ross announced that he would be the candidate on the morning of the 6 June, with nomination deadline falling on 7 June.

Labour candidate Andy Brown was suspended on 19 June 2024 following allegations that he questioned Russia's involvement in the Salisbury poisonings and downplayed the level of antisemitism in the Labour party.

The general election held on 4 July 2024 was won by the SNP's Seamus Logan, with a majority of 2.4% over Ross. This represented a notional gain on a swing of 11.7% and was the only seat in Scotland to be gained by the SNP and lost by the Conservatives. Reform UK came in third place with 14.6% of the vote, representing its best result in Scotland.

== Members of Parliament ==
Election	Member	Party
2024	Seamus Logan	Scottish National Party

== Election results ==
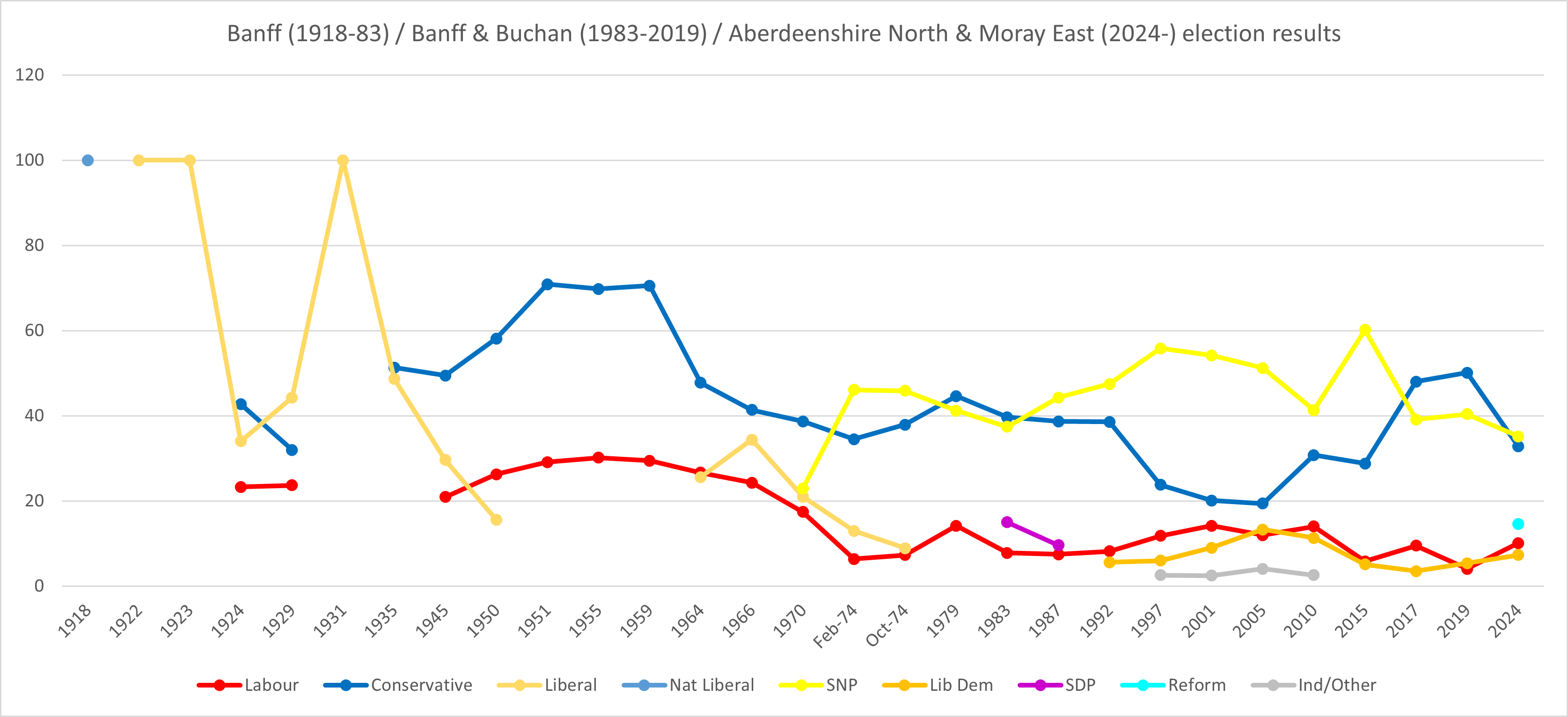
Banff (1918–83) / Banff & Buchan (1983–2019) / Aberdeenshire North & Moray East (2024–) election results

=== Elections in the 2020s ===
General election 2024: Aberdeenshire North and Moray East
Party	Candidate	Votes	%	±%
SNP	Seamus Logan	13,455	35.2	▼7.9
Conservative	Douglas Ross	12,513	32.8	▼15.5
Reform	Jo Hart	5,562	14.6	new
Labour	Andy Brown (Note: After nominations for the 2024 general election closed, Labour suspended Andy Brown and withdrew all support for his campaign on 19 June 2024 for spreading conspiracy theories regarding the Salisbury poisoning incident.)	3,876	10.1	▲5.9
Liberal Democrats	Ian Bailey	2,782	7.3	▲2.9
Majority		942	2.4	
Turnout		38,188	54.5	
SNP gain from Conservative		Swing	▲3.8	

=== Elections in the 2010s ===
2019 notional result (Note: Estimate of the 2019 general election result as if the revised boundaries recommended under the 2023 boundary review were in place)
Party	Vote	%
Conservative	22,174	48.3
SNP	19,775	43.1
Liberal Democrats	2,028	4.4
Labour	1,914	4.2
Majority	2,399	5.2
Turnout	50,122	64.2
Electorate	75,655	
