= 2022 Aberdeenshire Council election =

Aberdeenshire Council election

- 5 May 2022

All 70 seats to Aberdeenshire Council 36 seats needed for a majority
- Registered: 204,559
- Turnout: 44.7%
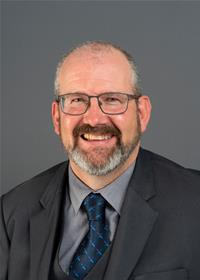

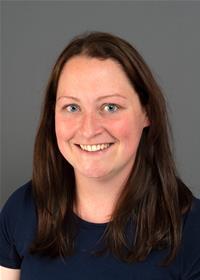
	First party	Second party
Leader	Mark Findlater	Gwyneth Petrie
Party	Conservative	SNP
Leader's seat	Troup	Huntly, Strathbogie and Howe of Alford
Last election	23 seats, 40.1%	21 seats, 28.2%
Seats before	18	16
Seats won	26 (Note: The Conservatives totals include Cllr Robbie Withey who was suspended from the party in April 2022 but appeared on the ballot as a Conservative candidate as this came after the close of nominations.)	21
Seat change	▲3	Steady
Popular vote	30,586	27,826
Percentage	33.9%	30.8%
Swing	▼6.2%	▲2.6%
	Third party	Fourth party
	LD	Ind
Leader	Peter Argyll	N/A
Party	Liberal Democrats	Independent
Leader's seat	Aboyne, Upper Deeside and Donside (defeated)	N/A
Last election	14 seats, 14.4%	10 seats, 10.9%
Seats before	13	18
Seats won	14	9
Seat change	Steady	▼1
Popular vote	13,269	11,967
Percentage	14.7%	13.3%
Swing	▲0.3%	▲2.4%
- 2022 Aberdeenshire Council Election Results Map.
Leader before election
Andy Kille
(Conservatives)
No overall control
Leader after election
Mark Findlater
(Conservatives)
No overall control

Elections to Aberdeenshire Council took place on Thursday 5 May 2022 on the same day as the 31 other Scottish local government elections. As with other Scottish council elections, it was held using single transferable vote (STV) – a form of proportional representation – in which multiple candidates are elected in each ward and voters rank candidates in order of preference.

For the second consecutive election, the Conservatives were returned as the largest party on the council, however they fell short of an overall majority despite gaining three seats on a reduced vote share. The Scottish National Party (SNP) remained the second largest party with 21 seats on an increased vote share from 2017. The Liberal Democrats also recorded no change in councillors, returning 14, on a slightly higher vote share than in 2017. Labour and the Greens lost their only seats on the council and the number of independent councillors returned decreased by one despite the number of votes being cast for these candidates increasing slightly.

The incumbent Conservative-Liberal Democrat-independent administration retained control of the council with Cllr Mark Findlater taking over from the retiring Andy Kille as leader of the council.

== Background ==
=== Previous election ===
At the previous election in 2017, the Conservatives were returned as the largest party for the first time. The Liberal Democrats and the Scottish National Party (SNP) had won every previous election in Aberdeenshire following the local government reforms in the 1990s. The Conservatives gained nine seats to hold 23 and leapfrog the SNP who lost seven seats, returning 21 councillors. The Liberal Democrats remained the third-largest party as they gained two seats to hold 14 while the number of independents fell by one to 10. Labour lost one seat to return one councillor and the Greens held their only seat.

2017 Aberdeenshire Council election result
Party	Seats	Vote share
Conservatives	23	40.1%
SNP	21	28.2%
Liberal Democrats	14	14.4%
Independent	10	10.9%
Labour	1	4.4%
Green	1	1.9%

=== Electoral system ===
The election used the 19 wards created under the Local Governance (Scotland) Act 2004, with 70 councillors being elected. Each ward elected either three or four councillors, using the single transferable vote (STV) electoral system – a form of proportional representation – where candidates are ranked in order of preference.

=== Composition ===
Since the previous election, several changes in the composition of the council occurred. Most were changes to the political affiliation of councillors including Conservative councillors Colin Pike, Jim Gifford, Lesley Berry, Jeff Hutchison, Mike Roy and Dianne Beagrie; SNP councillor Geva Blackett and Labour councillor Alison Evison, who resigned from their respective parties to become independents. Conservative councillors Sebastian Leslie and Robbie Withey were suspended from the party over unpaid council tax and assault allegations, respectively.

Conservative councillor Sandy Wallace, who resigned from the party and initially became an independent, defected to the Libertarian Party. Independent councillor Iain Sutherland joined the Conservatives and SNP councillors Alastair Bews and Leigh Wilson resigned from the party and initially became independents before defecting to the Alba Party. SNP councillor Brian Topping also defected to the Alba Party.

Four by-elections were held. The first was in Inverurie and District in October 2017 and resulted in a Conservative hold. This was followed by an SNP hold in Ellon and District in October 2020. The Conservatives gained a seat from the Lib Dems in East Garioch in June 2021. Finally, the Conservatives gained a second seat, this time from the SNP, in Mid-Formartine in August 2021.

Composition of Aberdeenshire Council
Party	2017 result	Dissolution
Conservative	23	18
SNP	21	16
Liberal Democrats	14	13
Independents	10	18 (Note: Includes 10 aligned independents, one member of the Democratic Independent and Green Group, five independents and two unaligned independents.)
Labour	1	0
Green	1	1
Alba	N/A	3
Libertarian	0	1

=== Retiring councillors ===
Retiring councilors
Ward	Party	Retiring councillor
Troup	Independent	Hamish Partridge
Fraserburgh and District	SNP	Charles Buchan
Fraserburgh and District	Conservative	Andy Kille
Central Buchan	Conservative	Marion Buchan
Central Buchan	SNP	Jim Ingram
Peterhead North and Rattray	SNP	Anne Allan
Peterhead South and Cruden	Independent	Stephen Calder
Peterhead South and Cruden	Conservative	Alan Fakley
Turriff and District	Independent	Sandy Duncan
West Garioch	SNP	Victoria Harper
Inverurie and District	Independent	Lesley Berry
East Garioch	Green	Martin Ford
Westhill and District	Conservative	Alistair McKelvie
Huntly, Strathbogie and Howe of Alford	Conservative	Moira Ingleby
Huntly, Strathbogie and Howe of Alford	Liberal Democrats	John Latham
Aboyne, Upper Deeside and Donside	Conservative	Paul Gibb
Banchory and Mid-Deeside	Liberal Democrats	Rosemary Bruce
North Kincardine	Liberal Democrats	Ian Mollison
Stonehaven and Lower Deeside	Libertarian	Sandy Wallace
Mearns	Liberal Democrats	Bill Howatson

=== Candidates ===
The total number of candidates increased from 116 in 2017 to 135. Unlike the previous election, the SNP did not field the highest number of candidates. After their success in the 2017 election, the Conservatives fielded a total of 33 candidates – 10 more than the previous election – while the number of SNP candidates fell from 34 to 26. Both parties, along with the Liberal Democrats, contested every ward. The number of independent candidates increased by three to 22 while the Lib Dems fielded one candidate in each of the 19 wards – the same as they did five years previous. Labour only contested 11 wards, three fewer than 2017 while the number of Green candidates increased from five to 10. For the first time, the Alba Party (seven), the Scottish Family Party (five) and the Independence for Scotland Party (ISP) (one) fielded candidates in an Aberdeenshire election. The Libertarians again put forward one candidate however the Social Democratic Party (SDP) did not contest the election as they had done in 2017.

== Results ==
2022 Aberdeenshire Council election result
Party	Seats	Gains	Losses	Net gain/loss	Seats %	Votes %	Votes	+/−
Conservative	26	3	0	▲3	37.1	33.9	30,586	▼6.2
SNP	21	2	2	Steady	30.0	30.8	27,826	▲2.6
Liberal Democrats	14	2	2	Steady	20.0	14.7	13,269	▲0.3
Independent	9	3	4	▼1	12.8	13.3	11,967	▲2.4
Labour	0	0	1	▼1	0.0	4.1	3,717	▼0.3
Green	0	0	1	▼1	0.0	2.0	1,815	▲0.1
Alba	0	0	0	Steady	0.0	0.7	464	New
Scottish Family	0	0	0	Steady	0.0	0.6	419	New
ISP	0	0	0	Steady	0.0	0.0	36	New
Scottish Libertarian	0	0	0	Steady	0.0	0.0	34	0.0
Total	70						90,133	

Note: Votes are the sum of first preference votes across all council wards. The net gain/loss and percentage changes relate to the result of the previous Scottish local elections on 4 May 2017. This is because STV has an element of proportionality which is not present unless multiple seats are being elected. This may differ from other published sources showing gain/loss relative to seats held at the dissolution of Scotland's councils.

=== Ward summary ===
Results of the 2022 Aberdeenshire Council election by ward
Ward	%	Cllrs	%	Cllrs	%	Cllrs	%	Cllrs	%	Cllrs	Total Cllrs
Ward	Con		SNP		Lib Dem		Ind		Others		Total Cllrs
Banff and District	27.8	1	31.9	1	3.8	0	27.0	1	9.4	0	3
Troup	50.2	2	37.3	1	8.5	0			4.1	0	3
Fraserburgh and District	32.4	1	20.0	1	4.8	1	36.0	1	6.7	0	4
Central Buchan	33.3	1	31.1	2	13.0	1	11.3	0	11.3	0	4
Peterhead North and Rattray	26.7	1	29.1	1	3.7	0	38.1	2	2.4	0	4
Peterhead South and Cruden	41.3	1	46.5	1	12.2	1					3
Turriff and District	39.1	2	33.9	1	23.5	1			3.5	0	4
Mid-Formartine	33.3	1	33.7	1	14.9	1	18.2	1			4
Ellon and District	35.6	2	31.7	1	22.0	1			10.7	0	4
West Garioch	27.1	1	29.4	1	12.7	1	17.0	0	13.6	0	3
Inverurie and District	25.7	1	31.1	1	17.0	1	22.5	1	3.8	0	4
East Garioch	27.4	1	41.0	1	9.4	1	14.5	1	7.7	0	4
Westhill and District	39.6	2	25.1	1	26.3	1			9.0	0	4
Huntly, Strathbogie and Howe of Alford	40.4	2	34.5	1	13.9	1	2.7	0	8.4	0	4
Aboyne, Upper Deeside and Donside	34.5	1	21.7	1	17.5	0	22.7	1	3.7	0	3
Banchory and Mid-Deeside	42.7	1	24.0	1	21.5	1			11.8	0	3
North Kincardine	26.9	1	36.2	2	15.5	1	14.3	0	7.1	0	4
Stonehaven and Lower Deeside	32.0	2	27.0	1	22.7	1	8.3	0	10.0	0	4
Mearns	31.8	2	29.0	1	6.5	0	21.0	1	11.8	0	4
Total	33.9	26	30.8	21	14.7	14	13.3	9	7.5	0	70

=== Seats changing hands ===
Below is a list of seats which elected a different party or parties from 2017 in order to highlight the change in political composition of the council from the previous election. The list does not include defeated incumbents who resigned or defected from their party and subsequently failed re-election while the party held the seat.

Seats changing hands
Seat	2017		2022	
Seat	Party	Member	Party	Member
Troup	Independent	Hamish Partridge	Conservative	Richard Menard
Fraserburgh and District	SNP	Brian Topping	Liberal Democrats	Ann Bell
Central Buchan	Independent	Norman Smith	SNP	Geoff Crowson
Peterhead South and Cruden	Independent	Stephen Calder	Liberal Democrats	Colin Alexander Simpson
Turriff and District	Independent	Sandy Duncan	Conservative	Gordon Lang
Ellon and District	SNP	Anouk Kloppert	Conservative	John Crawley
East Garioch	Green	Martin Ford	Independent	Jim Gifford
Aboyne, Upper Deeside and Donside	Liberal Democrats	Peter Argyle	Independent	Geva Blackett
North Kincardine	Labour	Alison Evison	SNP	Catherine Mary Victor
Mearns	Liberal Democrats	Bill Howatson	Independent	Alison Evison

Notes

1. Note 1: In 2017, Brian Topping was elected as an SNP candidate but later defected to Alba.
2. Note 2: Cllr Kloppert successfully stood for election in Aboyne, Upper Deeside and Donside.
3. Note 3: In 2017, Geva Blackett was elected as an SNP candidate but later resigned from the party. The SNP held their seat in Aboyne, Upper Deeside and Donside at the 2022 election.
4. Note 4: In 2017, Cllr Evison was elected as a Labour candidate but later resigned from the party. She successfully stood for election in Mearns.

== Ward results ==
=== Banff and District ===
The SNP, Conservatives and independent candidate John Cox retained the seats they won at the previous election.

Banff and District − 3 seats
Party	Candidate	FPv%	Count						
Party	Candidate	FPv%	1	2	3	4	5	6	7
SNP	Glen Reynolds (incumbent)	31.9	1,265						
Conservative	Stewart Adams	27.8	1,103						
Independent	John Cox (incumbent)	19.8	787	834	862	892	921	950	1,023
Independent	Mike Roy (incumbent)	7.2	285	299	318	326	368	401	487
Labour	James Low	5.0	200	224	234	238	294	365	
Liberal Democrats	Sandy Leslie	3.8	150	167	181	199			
Green	Neil Woodward	2.6	105	182	185	214	239		
Alba	Iain Cameron	1.8	73	106	108				
Electorate: 9,185 Valid: 3,968 Spoilt: 34 Quota: 993 Turnout: 43.6%

=== Troup ===
The SNP retained the seat they won at the previous election while the Conservatives held their seat and gained one from retiring independent councillor Hamish Partridge.

Troup − 3 seats
Party	Candidate	FPv%	Count				
Party	Candidate	FPv%	1	2	3	4	5
Conservative	Mark Findlater (incumbent)	42.5	1,305				
SNP	Ross Cassie (incumbent)	37.3	1,144				
Liberal Democrats	Ian Bailey	8.5	260	299	378	546	
Conservative	Richard Menard	7.7	236	647	675	697	894
Green	Simon Scott	4.1	125	135	300		
Electorate: 7,641 Valid: 3,070 Spoilt: 54 Quota: 768 Turnout: 40.9%

=== Fraserburgh and District ===
The Conservatives and independent candidate Doreen Mair retained the seats they won at the previous election while the SNP held one of their two seats and the Liberal Democrats gained one seat from the SNP. In 2017, Brian Topping was elected as an SNP candidate before defecting to the Alba Party.

Fraserburgh and District − 4 seats
Party	Candidate	FPv%	Count					
Party	Candidate	FPv%	1	2	3	4	5	6
Conservative	James Adams	32.4	1,526					
Independent	Doreen Mair (incumbent)	32.1	1,509					
SNP	Seamus Logan	20.0	941					
Alba	Brian Topping (incumbent)	5.8	274	312	385	396		
Liberal Democrats	Ann Bell	4.8	228	402	557	574	650	883
Independent	Paul Greenall	3.9	182	269	423	444	553	
Scottish Family	John McColl	0.9	43	76	94			
Electorate: 11,604 Valid: 4,703 Spoilt: 40 Quota: 941 Turnout: 40.9%

=== Central Buchan ===
The Conservatives and Liberal Democrats retained the seats they had won at the previous election while the SNP held their only seat and gained one from independent candidate Norman Smith.

Central Buchan − 4 seats
Party	Candidate	FPv%	Count								
Party	Candidate	FPv%	1	2	3	4	5	6	7	8	9
Conservative	Hannah Powell	18.7	871	883	885	889	902	1,020			
SNP	David Mair	16.0	744	750	774	797	812	862	864	866	901
SNP	Geoff Crowson	15.1	705	710	740	788	810	843	844	845	881
Conservative	Steve Owen	14.6	679	690	693	697	714	759	831	834	
Liberal Democrats	Anne Simpson (incumbent)	13.0	607	613	617	641	715	946			
Independent	Norman Smith (incumbent)	11.3	527	535	551	561	597				
Labour	Arif Mahmood	4.6	213	215	223	239					
Green	Jamie Cole-Hamilton	2.9	135	138	145						
Alba	Charlotte Diana Cross	2.4	111	117							
Scottish Family	Joanna Moore	1.4	65								
Electorate: 11,170 Valid: 4,657 Spoilt: 85 Quota: 932 Turnout: 42.5%

=== Peterhead North and Rattray ===
The SNP and independent candidate Alan S. Buchan retained the seats they had won at the previous election. In 2017, independent candidate Dianne Beagrie was elected as a Conservative candidate and Conservative candidate Iain Sutherland was elected as an independent candidate. Cllr Beagrie retained her seat as an independent and the Conservatives retained their seat although Iain Sutherland was not re-elected.

Peterhead North and Rattray − 4 seats
Party	Candidate	FPv%	Count						
Party	Candidate	FPv%	1	2	3	4	5	6	7
SNP	Leanne McWhinnie	29.1	1,222						
Independent	Dianne Beagrie (incumbent)	23.2	974						
Conservative	Matthew James	14.3	599	610	626	633	637	665	1,125
Independent	Alan S. Buchan (incumbent)	13.0	548	605	631	679	741	823	877
Conservative	Iain Sutherland (incumbent)	12.5	523	536	554	563	571	589	
Liberal Democrats	Kevin Robert Anderson	3.7	156	202	208	225	258		
Alba	Trish McPherson	2.4	99	189	194	215			
Independent	Sharon Bradford	1.9	79	116	141				
Electorate: 11,821 Valid: 4,200 Spoilt: 68 Quota: 841 Turnout: 36.1%

=== Peterhead South and Cruden ===
The SNP and the Conservatives retained the seats they had won at the previous election while the Liberal Democrats gained one seat from retiring independent councillor Stephen Calder.

Peterhead South and Cruden − 3 seats
Party	Candidate	FPv%	Count			
Party	Candidate	FPv%	1	2	3	4
SNP	Stephen William Smith (incumbent)	46.5	1,578			
Conservative	George Hall (Note: In 2023, Cllr Hall left the Conservatives to sit as an independent.)	32.5	1,105			
Liberal Democrats	Colin Alexander Simpson	12.2	414	783	796	1,110
Conservative	Neil Johnstone	8.8	298	371	595	
Electorate: 9,135 Valid: 3,395 Spoilt: 59 Quota: 849 Turnout: 37.8%

=== Turriff and District ===
The SNP and Liberal Democrats retained the seats they had won at the previous election while the Conservatives retained one seat and gained one from retiring independent councillor Sandy Duncan.

Turriff and District − 4 seats
Party	Candidate	FPv%	Count				
Party	Candidate	FPv%	1	2	3	4	5
Conservative	Iain Walker Taylor (incumbent)	23.8	1,075				
Liberal Democrats	Anne Stirling (incumbent) (Note: Elected in 2017 as Anne Robertson.)	23.5	1,059				
SNP	Alastair Forsyth (incumbent)	17.5	792	798	825	869	1,624
SNP	Susan Dubois	16.4	740	741	751	823	
Conservative	Gordon Lang	15.3	690	839	881	895	904
Green	Kathryn Louise Vincent	3.5	159	161	186		
Electorate: 10,429 Valid: 4,515 Spoilt: 105 Quota: 904 Turnout: 44.3%

=== Mid-Formartine ===
The SNP, Conservatives, Liberal Democrats and independent candidate Paul Johnston retained the seats they won at the previous election.

Mid-Formartine − 4 seats
Party	Candidate	FPv%	Count				
Party	Candidate	FPv%	1	2	3	4	5
SNP	Jenny Nicol	19.2	971	1,597			
Independent	Paul Johnston (incumbent)	18.2	916	959	1,131		
Conservative	Derek Ritchie	17.4	876	879	897	910	1,648
Conservative	Sheila Powell (incumbent)	15.9	803	809	827	837	
Liberal Democrats	Andrew Hassan (incumbent)	14.9	752	782	934	1,000	1,048
SNP	Kenny Hutchison	14.4	728				
Electorate: 11,612 Valid: 5,046 Spoilt: 85 Quota: 1,010 Turnout: 44.2%

=== Ellon and District ===
The Liberal Democrats retained the seat they had won at the previous election while the Conservatives held one and gained one from the SNP and the SNP retained one of their two seats.

Ellon and District − 4 seats
Party	Candidate	FPv%	Count						
Party	Candidate	FPv%	1	2	3	4	5	6	7
Liberal Democrats	Isobel Davidson (incumbent)	22.0	1,205						
SNP	Louise McAllister (incumbent)	20.8	1,139						
Conservative	John Crawley	19.1	1,050	1,063	1,064	1,070	1,140		
Conservative	Gillian Owen (incumbent)	16.5	906	935	936	946	993	1,028	1,202
SNP	Josh Gall	10.9	599	612	645	772	871	873	
Labour	Mark Lappin	6.3	348	370	371	444			
Green	Craig William Stewart	4.4	241	255	258				
Electorate: 11,837 Valid: 5,488 Spoilt: 76 Quota: 1,098 Turnout: 47.0%

=== West Garioch ===
The SNP, Liberal Democrats and the Conservatives retained the seats they had won at the previous election.

West Garioch − 3 seats
Party	Candidate	FPv%	Count							
Party	Candidate	FPv%	1	2	3	4	5	6	7	8
SNP	Moray Grant	29.4	1,247							
Conservative	Sam Payne	27.1	1,150							
Liberal Democrats	Hazel Smith (incumbent)	12.7	539	561	588	598	683	736	956	1,318
Independent	Sheena Lonchay	10.6	451	468	480	493	536	696	773	
Labour	Sasha Brydon	7.6	324	348	357	365	425	451		
Independent	Sebastian Leslie (incumbent) (Note: In 2018, West Garioch Conservative councillor Sebastian Leslie was suspended from the party over council tax arrears.)	6.4	273	282	299	306	326			
Green	Anne Mansfield	4.3	182	251	253	279				
Alba	Elaine Mitchell	1.7	71	88	89					
Electorate: 9,227 Valid: 4,237 Spoilt: 44 Quota: 1,060 Turnout: 46.4%

=== Inverurie and District ===
The SNP, the Conservatives, the Liberal Democrats and independent candidate Judy Margaret Whyte retained the seats they had won at the previous election.

Inverurie and District − 4 seats
Party	Candidate	FPv%	Count	
Party	Candidate	FPv%	1	2
Conservative	David Keating (Note: Sitting councillor for East Garioch.)	25.7	1,276	
SNP	Neil Baillie (incumbent)	24.1	1,200	
Independent	Judy Margaret Whyte (incumbent)	22.5	1,120	
Liberal Democrats	Marion Ewenson (incumbent)	17.0	843	1,003
SNP	Archie Peebles	6.9	343	348
Green	Denise May Rothnie	3.8	187	195
Electorate: 12,128 Valid: 4,969 Spoilt: 83 Quota: 994 Turnout: 41.7%

=== East Garioch ===
The SNP, the Liberal Democrats and the Conservatives retained the seats they had won at the previous election while independent candidate Jim Gifford gained a seat from the Greens. In 2017, Cllr Gifford was elected as a Conservative candidate in Mid-Formartine.

East Garioch − 4 seats
Party	Candidate	FPv%	Count				
Party	Candidate	FPv%	1	2	3	4	5
SNP	Glen Reid (incumbent)	41.0	1,727				
Conservative	Dominic Lonchay (incumbent)	27.4	1,156				
Liberal Democrats	Trevor Booth Mason	9.4	398	564	649	720	1,041
Labour	Rosanna Dobbin	7.7	323	496	538	595	
Independent	Jim Gifford (Note: Sitting councillor for Mid-Formartine.)	7.6	321	441	502	763	871
Independent	Drew Cullinane	6.9	290	438	476		
Electorate: 10,414 Valid: 4,215 Spoilt: 24 Quota: 844 Turnout: 40.7%

=== Westhill and District ===
The Conservatives (2), the SNP (1) and the Liberal Democrats (1) retained the seats they had won at the previous election.

Westhill and District − 4 seats
Party	Candidate	FPv%	Count			
Party	Candidate	FPv%	1	2	3	4
Conservative	Ron McKail (incumbent)	29.0	1,655			
Liberal Democrats	Iris Margaret Walker (incumbent)	26.3	1,498			
SNP	Fatima Joji	25.1	1,430			
Conservative	Craig Miller	10.6	605	1,050	1,135	1,144
Labour	Lesley Young	7.6	434	455	604	705
Alba	Colin MacKay	0.8	48	53	61	101
ISP	Stephen Cameron	0.6	36	38	47	105
Electorate: 12,033 Valid: 5,706 Spoilt: 58 Quota: 1,142 Turnout: 47.9%

=== Huntly, Strathbogie and Howe of Alford ===
The Conservatives (2), the SNP (1) and the Liberal Democrats (1) retained the seats they had won at the previous election.

Huntly, Strathbogie and Howe of Alford − 4 seats
Party	Candidate	FPv%	Count						
Party	Candidate	FPv%	1	2	3	4	5	6	7
SNP	Gwyneth Petrie (incumbent)	34.5	1,945						
Conservative	Lauren Knight	26.5	1,491						
Conservative	Robbie Withey (incumbent) (Note: Councillor Robbie Withey was suspended from the Conservative Party in April 2022 after it was alleged he grabbed a man by the throat. As this was after the close of nomination of candidates for the election in May, he still appeared on the ballot as a Conservative candidate.)	14.0	788	820	1,047	1,055	1,092	1,094	1,277
Liberal Democrats	Jeff Goodhall	13.9	784	976	1,021	1,033	1,143		
Labour	Bryan Scott Begg	7.8	441	630	651	655	728	735	
Independent	Rosie Leagas	2.7	152	264	276	298			
Scottish Libertarian	Stuart Whitby	0.6	34	58	62				
Electorate: 12,148 Valid: 5,635 Spoilt: 79 Quota: 1,128 Turnout: 47.0%

=== Aboyne, Upper Deeside and Donside ===
The Conservatives and the SNP retained the seats they had won at the previous election. In 2017, Geva Blackett was elected as an SNP candidate but subsequently resigned from the party. She retained her seat as an independent candidate while the Liberal Democrats lost their seat.

Aboyne, Upper Deeside and Donside − 3 seats
Party	Candidate	FPv%	Count					
Party	Candidate	FPv%	1	2	3	4	5	6
Independent	Geva Blackett (incumbent)	22.7	1,098	1,127	1,173	1,272		
SNP	Anouk Kloppert (Note: Sitting councillor for Ellon and District.)	21.7	1,049	1,091	1,098	1,104	1,118	1,459
Conservative	Sarah Brown	21.3	1,029	1,040	1,571			
Liberal Democrats	Peter Argyle (incumbent)	17.5	846	908	950	1,064	1,091	
Conservative	Claudia Leith	13.2	640	653				
Labour	John Lawson	3.7	179					
Electorate: 9,066 Valid: 4,841 Spoilt: 40 Quota: 1,211 Turnout: 53.8%

=== Banchory and Mid-Deeside ===
The Conservatives, the SNP and the Liberal Democrats retained the seats they won at the previous election.

Banchory and Mid-Deeside − 3 seats
Party	Candidate	FPv%	Count			
Party	Candidate	FPv%	1	2	3	4
Conservative	Ann Ross (incumbent) (Note: In 2024, Cllr Ross quit the Conservatives to sit as an independent.)	25.1	1,211			
SNP	Eileen Durno (incumbent)	24.0	1,158	1,158	1,161	1,264
Liberal Democrats	Yi-pei Chou Turvey	21.5	1,040	1,040	1,049	1,340
Conservative	Harriet Cross	17.6	852	854	867	924
Labour	Andy Brown	11.1	536	536	542	
Scottish Family	Graeme Craib	0.7	35	35		
Electorate: 9,105 Valid: 4,832 Spoilt: 38 Quota: 1,209 Turnout: 53.5%

=== North Kincardine ===
The Conservatives and the Liberal Democrats retained the seats they had won at the previous election while the SNP retained their seat and gained one from Labour. In 2017, independent candidates Colin Pike and Alastair Bews were elected as Conservative and SNP councillors respectively before resigning from their parties. Neither was re-elected.

North Kincardine − 4 seats
Party	Candidate	FPv%	Count								
Party	Candidate	FPv%	1	2	3	4	5	6	7	8	9
SNP	David Aitchison (Note: Sitting councillor for West Hill and District.)	21.6	1,182								
Conservative	Shirley Burnett	15.6	855	856	863	898	906	1,457			
Liberal Democrats	Mel Sullivan	15.5	850	852	864	896	993	1,016	1,126		
SNP	Catherine Mary Victor (Note: In 2024, Cllr Victor was suspended by the SNP.)	14.6	799	865	870	903	1,052	1,053	1,059	1,064	1,214
Conservative	Jeff Hutchison (Note: Sitting councillor for Mearns.)	11.3	620	621	626	633	637				
Independent	Colin Pike (incumbent)	9.6	527	528	534	649	684	718	804	815	
Green	Louise Claire Ross	5.7	314	319	335	348					
Independent	Alastair Bews (incumbent)	4.7	255	259	269						
Scottish Family	Elizabeth Wilson Leslie	1.4	75	76							
Electorate: 12,478 Valid: 5,477 Spoilt: 80 Quota: 1,096 Turnout: 44.5%

=== Stonehaven and Lower Deeside ===
The Conservatives (2), the SNP (1) and the Liberal Democrats (1) retained the seats they had won at the previous election.

Stonehaven and Lower Deeside − 4 seats
Party	Candidate	FPv%	Count							
Party	Candidate	FPv%	1	2	3	4	5	6	7	8
Liberal Democrats	Sarah Dickinson (incumbent)	22.7	1,263							
Conservative	Wendy Agnew (incumbent)	20.6	1,147							
SNP	Dawn Black	17.1	951	968	969	1,024	1,104	1,215		
Conservative	Alan Turner	11.3	630	652	677	681	721	852	854	1,018
SNP	Dennis Robertson (incumbent)	9.9	550	564	564	601	644	721	808	
Independent	Ma Simpson	8.3	462	489	491	518	631			
Labour	Raymond James Christie	6.9	383	412	415	453				
Green	Rachel Katherine Shanks	3.1	173	192	192					
Electorate: 11,356 Valid: 5,559 Spoilt: 86 Quota: 1,112 Turnout: 49.7%

=== Mearns ===
The Conservatives (2) and the SNP (1) retained the seats they had won at the previous election while independent candidate Alison Elizabeth McBean Evison gained a seat from the Liberal Democrats. Cllr Evison was previously a councillor for North Kincardine. In 2017, Alba Party candidate Leigh Wilson was elected as an SNP candidate. He was not re-elected.

Mearns − 4 seats
Party	Candidate	FPv%	Count									
Party	Candidate	FPv%	1	2	3	4	5	6	7	8	9	10
SNP	Kevin Stelfox	29.0	1,677									
Conservative	George Carr (incumbent)	21.0	1,217									
Independent	Alison Elizabeth McBean Evison (Note: Sitting councillor for North Kincardine.)	10.8	623	663	667	674	699	730	792	894	1,111	1,349
Conservative	Laurie Carnie	10.7	619	625	668	681	689	695	724	741	825	924
Independent	Dave Stewart	8.9	513	546	550	558	573	592	622	672		
Liberal Democrats	Shona Ewen	6.5	377	413	415	418	422	430	561	680	789	
Labour	Yvonne Allan	5.8	336	392	393	396	399	412				
Green	Douglas Fraser	3.4	194	375	376	380	398	447	506			
Alba	Leigh Wilson (incumbent)	1.7	99	171	171	179	186					
Independent	David Allan Neill	1.3	75	86	86	87						
Scottish Family	Diane Elizabeth Laurenson	0.9	52	56	56							
Electorate: 12,170 Valid: 5,782 Spoilt: 57 Quota: 1,157 Turnout: 47.7%

== Aftermath ==
On 18 May 2022, a coalition deal was announced between the Conservatives, Liberal Democrats, and seven aligned independents to form the council administration. The following day, as part of the deal, Cllr Mark Findlater, Conservative councillor for the Troup ward, was appointed council leader with Cllr Anne Stirling from the Liberal Democrats becoming depute leader and Independent councillor Judy Whyte was elected Provost.

Cllr Robbie Withey was given an absolute discharge after admitting to acting in a threatening or abusive manner in March 2023. His suspension from the Conservatives was later lifted.

In 2023, Peterhead South and Cruden councillor George Hall left the Conservatives to sit as an independent.

Council leader Mark Findlater was ousted from his role as Conservative group leader in May 2023 and was replaced in the role by Cllr Gillian Owen. The following month, he resigned as council leader and Cllr Owen was elected in his place. Cllr Findlater later resigned from the Conservatives to sit as an independent in October 2024.

The opposition SNP group suspended Cllr Catherine Victor in February 2024 for sharing an anti-Semitic post on social media. Her suspension was lifted later that year.

During the council's budget meeting in February 2024, Conservative councillor Ann Ross quit the party to sit as an independent in protest at the proposed budget which would be "detrimental" to her ward.

On 24 October 2024 Troup councillor Mark Findlater and Mearns councillor Laurie Carnie became the first Scottish councillors for Reform UK. Both had left the Conservatives earlier in the month.

Cllr Robbie Withey left the Conservatives in a row over nursery closures in May 2025 to sit as an independent.

In May and June 2025, more councillors defected from the Conservatives to Reform UK. First, Ellon and District councillor John Crawley defected on 8 May. Two weeks later, East Garioch councillor Dominic Lochnay followed suit. On 12 June, Cllr Lauren Knight also joined Reform UK. Cllr John Cox also joined Reform UK but continued to sit as an independent on the council.

A WhatsApp message scandal engulfed council leader Gillian Owens in May 2025 after using obscene language towards her Conservative colleagues amid rising tensions over the Reform UK defections. She resigned as Conservative group leader and was replaced in the role by Banff and District councillor Stewart Adams. In the midst of the scandal, Cllr Dominic Lonchay defected from the Conservatives to Reform UK. The following month, Cllr Owens was replaced as council leader by Cllr Adams and Liberal Democrat Cllr Anne Stirling who were appointed co-leaders. Cllr Owens also resigned from the Conservative party to sit as an independent saying she was "betrayed by friends" in the party.

=== November 2024 by-elections ===
In September 2024, newly-elected Aberdeenshire North and Moray East MP Seamus Logan stood down as councillor for Fraserburgh and District. His fellow SNP councillors Kevin Stelfox - councillor for Mearns - and David Mair - councillor for Central Buchan - also announced their decisions to stand down. All three by-elections, held on 7 November 2024, were won by the Conservative candidates - Iain Sutherland, Tracey Smith and Peter Chapman.

Fraserburgh and District by-election (7 November 2024) - 1 seat
Party	Candidate	FPv%	Count				
Party	Candidate	FPv%	1	2	3	4	5
Conservative	Iain Sutherland	36.3	1,145	1,158	1,225	1,556	1,884
SNP	Mike McDonald	28.4	895	915	966	1,113	
Reform	Conrad Ritchie	25.9	817	829	864		
Liberal Democrats	Sandy Leslie	7.0	222	233			
Scottish Family	Dawn Smith	2.2	71				
Electorate: 11,584 Valid: 3,150 Quota: 1,576 Turnout: 27.4%

Central Buchan by-election (7 November 2024) - 1 seat
Party	Candidate	FPv%	Count				
Party	Candidate	FPv%	1	2	3	4	5
Conservative	Peter Chapman	41.3	1,260	1,272	1,292	1,430	1,614
SNP	Sarah Wilken	28.5	869	879	897	925	1,069
Liberal Democrats	Ian Bailey	14.3	435	452	463	507	
Reform	Andrew Curwen	10.8	331	338	358		
Scottish Family	Phil Reynolds	2.7	83	89			
Independent	Dean Ward	2.3	71				
Electorate: 11,408 Valid: 3,049 Quota: 1,525 Turnout: 27.0%

Mearns by-election (7 November 2024) - 1 seat
Party	Candidate	FPv%	Count			
Party	Candidate	FPv%	1	2	3	4
Conservative	Tracey Smith	39.2	1,347	1,350	1,494	1,768
SNP	Hannah Scott	24.0	823	891	928	1,181
Liberal Democrats	Isobel Knights	21.7	745	788	851	
Reform	Claudia Leith	10.9	375	384		
Green	William Linegar	4.0	136			
Electorate: 12,414 Valid: 3,435 Quota: 1,718 Turnout: 27.8%

=== Peterhead South and Cruden by-election ===
In April 2026, Peterhead South and Cruden councillor George Hall died following a serious illness. A by-election was held on 2 July 2026 and won by the SNP.

Peterhead South and Cruden by-election (2 July 2026) - 1 seat
Party	Candidate	FPv%	Count
Party	Candidate	FPv%	1
SNP	Angus Matheson	36.5	741
Reform	Andy Curwen	22.9	465
Conservative	Ross Gibb	21.3	432
Independent	John Ross	7.4	150
Independent	Ross Thomson	6.5	132
Liberal Democrats	Tony Ware	2.8	56
Scottish Family	Dave Bestwick	2.7	54
Electorate: 9,206 Valid: 2,043 Quota: 1,022 Turnout: 22.2%
