= Seamus Logan =

Scottish politician

Seamus Logan MP
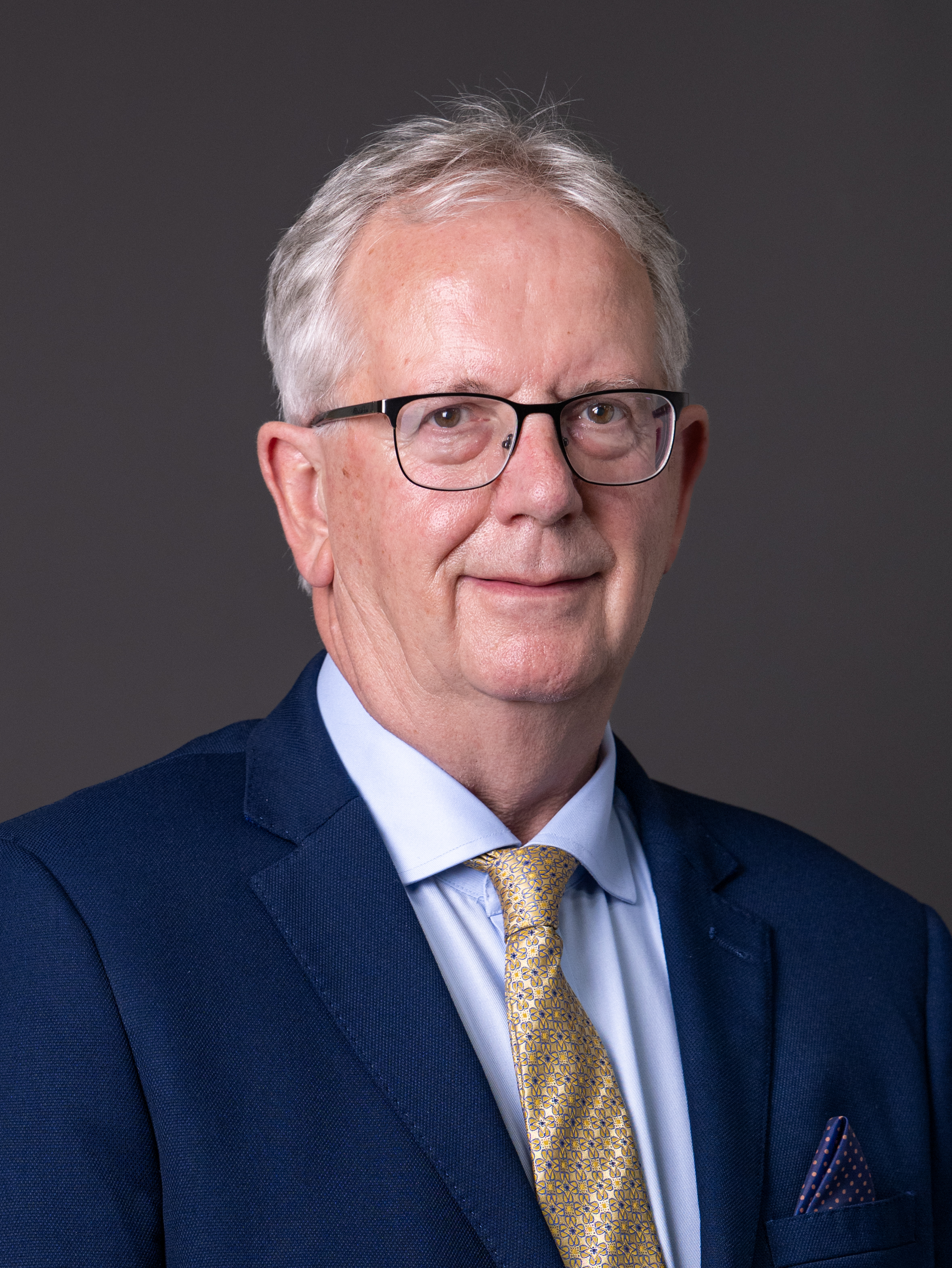
- Official portrait, 2026

Member of Parliament for Aberdeenshire North and Moray East
- Incumbent
- Assumed office 4 July 2024
- Preceded by: Constituency established
- Majority: 942 (2.4%)

Member of Aberdeenshire Council for Fraserburgh and District
- In office 5 May 2022 – 30 August 2024
- Succeeded by: Ian Sutherland

Personal details
- Born: 4 January 1958 (age 68) Ballymoney, County Antrim, Northern Ireland, United Kingdom
- Party: Scottish National Party
- Education: University of Stirling

Seamus Logan (born 4 January 1958) is a Scottish politician who has served as a Member of Parliament (MP) for Aberdeenshire North and Moray East since July 2024. Born in Northern Ireland, Logan became active in Scottish politics in 2022.

== Early life and education ==
Seamus Logan was born on 4 January 1958 in Ballymoney, County Antrim, Northern Ireland, to Catholic parents. He was educated at St MacNissi's College, an all-boys Catholic school in the Glens of Antrim. He studied at the University of Stirling, Scotland, graduating with a Bachelor of Arts (BA) degree.

After university, he returned to Northern Ireland and entered a career in health and social care. He undertook a Master of Social Work (MSW) degree at Queen's University Belfast. From 1982 to 1988, he worked as a social worker specialising in mental health. From 1988 to 2008, he worked successively as a team leader, clinical services manager, and commissioner. From 2008 until he retired in 2013, he was a performance and service improvement regional director.

== Political career ==
After Logan retired from his healthcare job in 2018, he considered fully retiring or becoming a coach driver, but ran in a councillor election. He was elected as a SNP councillor for Fraserburgh and District on Aberdeenshire Council in 2022. Logan resigned from this position on 30 August 2024.

On 5 July 2024 he was elected as a Member of the Parliament (MP) for the newly-formed constituency of Aberdeenshire North and Moray East, having received 13,455 votes (35.2%) against Conservative Douglas Ross. On 17 July 2024, he made his maiden speech in the House of Commons in the debate following the King's Speech.

In February 2025, Logan was reported to have drawn up an all-female "hit list" of SNP MSPs that were to be asked to stand down from the Scottish Parliament to make room for ex-MPs who had lost their seats in the 2024 UK general election, at the direction of Stephen Flynn, then leader of the SNP in Westminster. Logan claimed that he did not create a list and that he did not know most of the people on the list.

== Works cited ==
- Bowie, Justin (14 February 2025). "Aberdeenshire SNP MP Seamus Logan responds to Holyrood 'hit list' claims". The Press and Journal. Archived from the original on 15 February 2025.
- Paterson, Kirsteen (27 November 2024). "Seamus Logan: My earliest memory? My mother crying when Kennedy was shot". Holyrood. Archived from the original on 17 June 2025.
