= James Adams (Scottish politician) =

Scottish politician (born 1992)

James Adams MSP
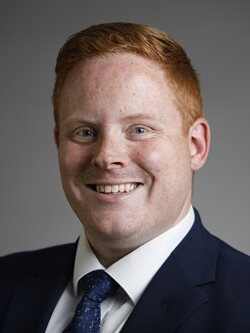
- Official portrait, 2026

Member of the Scottish Parliament for North East Scotland (1 of 7 Regional MSPs)
- Incumbent
- Assumed office 23 June 2026
- Preceded by: Douglas Lumsden

Personal details
- Born: James Alexander Adams; 1992 (age 33–34) Fraserburgh, Aberdeenshire, Scotland
- Party: Scottish Conservatives
- Children: 2
- Education: Royal Holloway, University of London (BA)
- Website: www.banffandbuchanconservatives.org.uk/people/james-adams

James Alexander Adams (born 1992) is a Scottish Conservative politician who has served as the Member of the Scottish Parliament (MSP) for North East Scotland since 23 June 2026 following the election of Douglas Lumsden as an MP at the 2026 Aberdeen South by-election.

== Background ==
James Alexander Adams was born in Fraserburgh in 1992. He lives with his wife and two daughters in Fraserburgh.

== Career ==
Adams joined the Scottish Conservatives in 2009. He worked in the National Health Service as a clinic administrator at a COVID-19 vaccination centre. Adams was elected as a councillor for Fraserburgh and District at the 2022 Aberdeenshire Council election. He is a director at Fraserburgh F.C..

At the 2026 Scottish Parliament election in May 2026, he unsuccessfully contested Banffshire and Buchan Coast constituency. He was also the fourth-placed candidate on the Conservative regional list for North East Scotland, being the highest-placed Conservative to not be elected. Douglas Lumsden, who was second on the regional list there, vacated his Scottish Parliament seat after being elected to the House of Commons in June 2026, which led to Adams taking his place in the Scottish Parliament.
