= Peter Chapman (politician) =

Scottish politician (born 1950)

Member of the Scottish Parliament for North East Scotland
- In office 5 May 2016 – 5 May 2021

Member of Aberdeenshire Council for Central Buchan
- Incumbent
- Assumed office 8 Nov 2025
- Preceded by: David Mair

Personal details
- Born: Peter John Chapman; 13 May 1950 (age 76) Ellon, Aberdeenshire, Scotland
- Party: Scottish Conservative Party
- Website: https://www.peter-chapman.org.uk/

Peter John Chapman MSP (born 13 May 1950) is a retired Scottish Conservative and Unionist politician. He served as a Member of the Scottish Parliament (MSP) for the North East Scotland region between 2016 and 2021. In the Scottish Parliament, he was the Conservative spokesperson for rural economy and connectivity, until May 2018 when he resigned over a lobbying row.

== Political career ==
Chapman served as an Aberdeenshire councillor from 2007 until 2012, and also served for six years as a local Director of the National Farmers Union Mutual Insurance Society. He served as a Director of Aberdeen and Northern Marts from 9 September 2014 until 9 August 2016. He was an ANM director when ANM submitted their planning development for the extension of their Thainstone Business Park on Thainstone Hill. He played an active role during the independence referendum as part of the Better Together campaign.

=== Member of the Scottish Parliament ===
Chapman stood as the Conservative candidate in Banffshire and Buchan Coast in the Scottish Parliament elections on 5 May 2016, coming second to the SNP's Stewart Stevenson and was then elected to the Scottish Parliament by the North East Scotland regional list. The Conservatives appointed him as their spokesperson for rural economy and connectivity. He resigned that role on 16 May 2018 after a newspaper became aware of him lobbying local councillors to support ANM's industrial development proposals, without declaring his financial interest, owning £50,000 worth of ANM shares (the maximum allowed). He sits on the Rural Economy and Connectivity Committee of the Scottish Parliament.

Chapman retired from the Scottish Parliament at the 2021 election.

=== Post-Holyrood ===
Chapman came out of retirement in 2024, to stand in a local council by-election for Aberdeenshire Council, in the Central Buchan (ward), in 2024.
