= 2007 Aberdeenshire Council election =

2007 Scottish local government election

- 3 May 2007

All 68 seats to Aberdeenshire Council 35 seats needed for a majority
	First party	Second party
Party	Liberal Democrats	SNP
Last election	28 seats, 33.5%	18 seats, 27.6%
Seats won	24	22
Seat change	▼4	▲4
Popular vote	24,175	33,120
Percentage	25.2%	34.5%
Swing	▼8.3%	▲6.9%
	Third party	Fourth party
Party	Conservative	Independent
Last election	11 seats, 21.0%	11 seats, 14.5%
Seats won	14	8
Seat change	▲3	▼3
Popular vote	19,946	12,182
Percentage	20.8%	12.7%
Swing	▼0.2%	▼1.8%
- 2007 Aberdeenshire Council Election Results Map

Elections to Aberdeenshire Council were held on 3 May 2007 the same day as the other Scottish local government elections and the Scottish Parliament general election. The election was the first one using 19 new wards created as a result of the Local Governance (Scotland) Act 2004, each ward would elect three or four councillors using the single transferable vote system form of proportional representation. The new wards replaced 68 single-member wards which used the plurality (first past the post) system of election.

The council remained under no overall control and a coalition was formed between the Liberal Democrats and the Conservatives.

== Background ==
=== Previous election ===
At the previous election in 2003 the Liberal Democrats won 28 seats, falling 7 seats short of an overall majority. The SNP, Conservative and Independent groups also fell well short of an overall majority.

2003 Aberdeenshire Council election result
Party	Seats	Vote share
Liberal Democrats	28	33.5%
SNP	18	27.6%
Conservative	11	21.0%
Independent	11	14.5%

=== Composition ===
There was one by-election in the 2003-07 term. The seat was held by the Conservatives.

Composition of Aberdeenshire Council
Party	2003 election	Dissolution
Liberal Democrats	28	28
SNP	18	18
Conservative	11	11
Independent	11	11

== Results ==
2007 Aberdeenshire Council election result
Party	Seats	Gains	Losses	Net gain/loss	Seats %	Votes %	Votes	+/−
Liberal Democrats	24	-	-	▼4	35.3	25.2	24,175	▼8.3
SNP	22	-	-	▲4	32.4	34.5	33,120	▲6.9
Conservative	14	-	-	▲3	20.6	20.8	19,946	▼0.2
Independent	8	-	-	▼3	11.8	12.7	12,182	▼1.8
Labour	0	-	-	Steady	0.0	5.4	5,189	▲2.1
Green	0	-	-	Steady	0.0	1.1	1,097	New
Solidarity	0	-	-	Steady	0.0	0.1	112	New
BNP	0	-	-	Steady	0.0	0.1	87	New

Note: "Votes" are the first preference votes. The net gain/loss and percentage changes relate to the result of the previous Scottish local elections on 1 May 2003. This may differ from other published sources showing gain/loss relative to seats held at dissolution of Scotland's councils.

== Ward results ==
=== Banff and District ===
Banff and District - 3 seats
Party	Candidate	FPv%	Count							
Party	Candidate	FPv%	1	2	3	4	5	6	7	8
SNP	Ian Gray	24.0	1,088	1,092	1,103	1,142				
Liberal Democrats	Jack Mair	15.3	694	704	713	773	773	848	915	1,132
Independent	John Cox	15.2	691	707	742	791	791	925	1,055	1,257
Conservative	Neil Chalmers	13.6	616	626	640	666	666	741	792	
SNP	Kathryn Parr	11.0	500	509	525	554	558	609		
Independent	Sandy Buchan	8.4	383	398	438	475	475			
Green	Jonny Barton	6.6	298	301	319					
Independent	John Calder	3.8	172	180						
Independent	Ian Page	2.1	94							
Electorate: 8,815 Valid: 4,536 Spoilt: 105 Quota: 1,135 Turnout: 53.1%

=== Troup ===
Troup - 3 seats
Party	Candidate	FPv%	Count	
Party	Candidate	FPv%	1	2
SNP	Mitchell Burnett	47.7	1,798	
Conservative	John Duncan	24.3	914	1,060
Independent	Sydney Mair	20.4	770	975
Liberal Democrats	Ian Findlay	7.6	286	422
Electorate: 7,563 Valid: 3,768 Spoilt: 53 Quota: 943 Turnout: 50.9%

=== Fraserburgh and District ===
Fraserburgh and District - 4 seats
Party	Candidate	FPv%	Count						
Party	Candidate	FPv%	1	2	3	4	5	6	7
SNP	Brian Topping	27.1	1,487						
SNP	Ian Tait	20.6	1,131						
Independent	Michael Watt	15.1	831	865	869	890	918	1,041	1,370
SNP	Andy Ritchie	14.5	795	1,022	1,037	1,046	1,060	1,090	1,165
Independent	Dennis Duthie	9.3	509	520	522	554	587	728	
Conservative	Bob Sim	8.5	466	482	484	490	522		
Liberal Democrats	Dominique-Paul Lonchay	3.0	164	167	168	171			
Independent	James Milne	2.0	109	116	116				
Electorate: 11,011 Valid: 5,492 Spoilt: 168 Quota: 1,099 Turnout: 51.8%

=== Central Buchan ===
Central Buchan - 4 seats
Party	Candidate	FPv%	Count							
Party	Candidate	FPv%	1	2	3	4	5	6	7	8
SNP	Sandy Stronach	20.2	1,096							
Independent	Norman Smith	19.4	1,054	1,054	1,080	1,142				
Conservative	Peter Chapman	17.2	933	933	974	1,022	1,031	1,087		
Independent	Albert Howe	14.6	790	790	822	911	933	1,016	1,016	1,283
SNP	Norma Thomson	13.2	718	726	771	804	812	870	870	
Labour	Carol Donald	5.9	318	318	363	378	381			
Independent	Jim Conn	4.9	265	265	290					
Liberal Democrats	Betty May	4.7	253	253						
Electorate: 10,020 Valid: 5,427 Spoilt: 91 Quota: 1,086 Turnout: 55.4%

=== Peterhead North and Rattray ===
Peterhead North and Rattray - 4 seats
Party	Candidate	FPv%	Count						
Party	Candidate	FPv%	1	2	3	4	5	6	7
SNP	Anne Allan	22.4	1,018						
Independent	Alan Buchan	20.9	948	948					
SNP	Fiona McRae	15.0	682	696	699	713	735	763	1,316
Conservative	Robert Thomas	14.4	655	655	659	667	704	803	819
SNP	Sandy Allan	12.9	585	666	671	685	718	752	
Liberal Democrats	Andrew Hassan	6.3	288	290	292	304	356		
Independent	Ian Cowie	5.6	256	257	265	289			
Solidarity	Steven Will	2.5	112	113	115				
Electorate: 10,274 Valid: 4,544 Spoilt: 150 Quota: 909 Turnout: 46.0%

=== Peterhead South and Cruden ===
Peterhead South and Cruden - 3 seats
Party	Candidate	FPv%	Count				
Party	Candidate	FPv%	1	2	3	4	5
SNP	Stephen Smith	29.4	1,205				
SNP	Stuart Pratt	21.6	888	1,016	1,032		
Liberal Democrats	Sam Coull	21.0	861	870	894	895	1,032
Independent	Raymond Matthew	13.0	535	542	637	638	767
Conservative	Steven Owen	10.3	422	425	443	443	
Independent	Veronica Johnston	4.7	193	196			
Electorate: 8,813 Valid: 4,104 Spoilt: 108 Quota: 1,027 Turnout: 48.1%

=== Turriff and District ===
Turriff and District - 3 seats
Party	Candidate	FPv%	Count				
Party	Candidate	FPv%	1	2	3	4	5
SNP	Sandy Duncan	41.9	1,916				
Conservative	Alistair Duffus Strachan	17.4	796	882	901	932	
Liberal Democrats	Anne Robertson	17.3	790	948	962	1,071	1,372
Independent	Alisan Norrie	16.4	748	900	935	971	1,304
Labour	Ann Marie Sheal	5.1	232	270	279		
BNP	Gary Raikes	1.9	87	119			
Electorate: 8,679 Valid: 4,569 Spoilt: 52 Quota: 1,143 Turnout: 53.5%

=== Mid-Formartine ===
Mid Formartine - 4 seats
Party	Candidate	FPv%	Count				
Party	Candidate	FPv%	1	2	3	4	5
SNP	Allan Hendry	33.6	2,035				
Liberal Democrats	Paul Johnston	27.4	1,661				
Conservative	Jim Gifford	17.1	1,034	1,141	1,182	1,261	
Liberal Democrats	John Kevin Loveday	11.2	677	855	1,134	1,210	1,227
Labour	Steve Thomson	7.7	469	558	586	613	618
Independent	Howard Kershaw	3.1	188	290	306		
Electorate: 11,047 Valid: 6,064 Spoilt: 59 Quota: 1,213 Turnout: 55.9%

=== Ellon and District ===
Ellon and District - 4 seats
Party	Candidate	FPv%	Count				
Party	Candidate	FPv%	1	2	3	4	5
SNP	Rob Merson	40.5	2,458				
Liberal Democrats	Isobel Davidson	23.2	1,407				
Conservative	Gillian Louise Owen	14.4	872	1,033	1,053	1,197	1,274
Liberal Democrats	Debra Margaret Storr	8.6	524	777	899	1,049	1,326
Labour	Ann Thorpe	7.5	456	587	599	648	
Independent	Diane Ripley	5.8	352	542	555		
Electorate: 11,186 Valid: 6,069 Spoilt: 69 Quota: 1,214 Turnout: 55.4%

=== West Garioch ===
West Garioch - 3 seats
Party	Candidate	FPv%	Count					
Party	Candidate	FPv%	1	2	3	4	5	6
SNP	Alison Grant	35.5	1,555					
Liberal Democrats	Sheena Margaret Lonchay	22.2	973	1,063	1,085	1,169		
Liberal Democrats	Hazel Al-Kowarri	18.4	807	884	899	981	1,027	1,358
Conservative	David Clucas	15.8	694	746	775	821	830	
Labour	Ricky Simpson	6.0	263	293	303			
Independent	Terry Rigby	2.1	93	125				
Electorate: 8,036 Valid: 4,385 Spoilt: 58 Quota: 1,097 Turnout: 55.7%

=== Inverurie and District ===
Inverurie and District - 4 seats
Party	Candidate	FPv%	Count					
Party	Candidate	FPv%	1	2	3	4	5	6
SNP	Bryan Hunter Stuart	29.6	1,515					
Liberal Democrats	Mike Raeburn	25.7	1,316					
Liberal Democrats	Martin Kitts-Hayes	16.9	865	975	1,172			
Conservative	Richard Cowling	14.9	762	823	837	864	928	1,190
Labour	Ellis Thorpe	11.1	567	637	659	693	737	
Independent	John Sangster	1.7	87	165	175	192		
Electorate: 9,361 Valid: 5,148 Spoilt: 86 Quota: 1,030 Turnout: 56.3%

=== East Garioch ===
East Garioch - 3 seats
Party	Candidate	FPv%	Count			
Party	Candidate	FPv%	1	2	3	4
SNP	Fergie Hood	31.9	1,420			
Liberal Democrats	Martin Anthony Ford	23.7	1,054	1,118		
Liberal Democrats	Nan Cullinane	21.8	968	1,025	1,030	1,206
Conservative	Gordon Naismith	15.5	687	726	726	769
Labour	Sheila Henderson	7.1	317	345	345	
Electorate: 8,185 Valid: 4,446 Spoilt: 56 Quota: 1,112 Turnout: 54.9%

=== Westhill and District ===
Westhill and District - 4 seats
Party	Candidate	FPv%	Count					
Party	Candidate	FPv%	1	2	3	4	5	6
Liberal Democrats	Gurudeo Singh Saluja	27.3	1,558					
Conservative	Ron McKail	22.9	1,306					
SNP	Amanda Allan	21.6	1,230					
Independent	Mark Cullen	14.8	845	896	945	967	1,031	1,407
Liberal Democrats	Sheila Thomson	8.1	460	736	774	794	935	
Labour	Ona Ramsay	5.3	301	325	333	344		
Electorate: 10,567 Valid: 5,700 Spoilt: 39 Quota: 1,141 Turnout: 55.0%

=== Huntly, Strathbogie and Howe of Alford ===
Huntly, Strathbogie and Howe of Alford - 4 seats
Party	Candidate	FPv%	Count						
Party	Candidate	FPv%	1	2	3	4	5	6	7
SNP	Joanna Strathdee	30.7	1,839						
Conservative	Moira Ingleby	27.3	1,635						
Liberal Democrats	Richard C Stroud	16.4	978	1,077	1,145	1,170	1,280		
Liberal Democrats	Alistair Ross	13.6	812	907	979	1,012	1,088	1,143	1,378
Labour	Bryan Begg	6.3	375	424	444	456	501	508	
Green	Jake Williams	4.2	251	340	376	421			
Independent	David Hutchison	1.5	91	135	177				
Electorate: 11,162 Valid: 5,981 Spoilt: 82 Quota: 1,197 Turnout: 54.7%

=== Aboyne, Upper Deeside and Donside ===
Aboyne, Upper Deeside and Donside - 3 seats
Party	Candidate	FPv%	Count				
Party	Candidate	FPv%	1	2	3	4	5
Conservative	Marcus Humphrey	29.3	1,444				
Liberal Democrats	Peter Argyle	26.1	1,286				
Conservative	Bruce Luffman	20.5	1,009	1,160	1,172	1,218	1,625
SNP	Carol Douglas	20.1	991	1,009	1,021	1,078	
Labour	Angus Murdoch	4.0	196	202	213		
Electorate: 8,467 Valid: 4,926 Spoilt: 75 Quota: 1,232 Turnout: 59.5%

=== Banchory and Mid-Deeside ===
Banchory and Mid-Deeside - 3 seats
Party	Candidate	FPv%	Count				
Party	Candidate	FPv%	1	2	3	4	5
Conservative	Jill Webster	35.6	1,570				
SNP	Linda Clark	24.2	1,068	1,140			
Liberal Democrats	Karen Clark	18.0	795	876	885	1,029	1,691
Liberal Democrats	Jean Henretty	15.3	300	790	798	857	
Labour	Andy Brown	6.8	300	326	331		
Electorate: 7,996 Valid: 4,409 Spoilt: 46 Quota: 1,103 Turnout: 56.3%

=== North Kincardine ===
North Kincardine - 4 seats
Party	Candidate	FPv%	Count						
Party	Candidate	FPv%	1	2	3	4	5	6	7
SNP	Alastair Bews	27.8	1,426						
Conservative	Carl H Nelson	18.4	946	972	1,008	1,065			
Liberal Democrats	Paul Melling	16.8	864	957	978	1,124			
Liberal Democrats	Ian Mollison	12.1	619	652	689	799	863	875	1,119
Independent	Henry Irvine-Fortescue	11.2	575	613	659	707	713	723	
Labour	Jim Milne	10.5	540	586	596				
Independent	Michelle Reid-Hay	3.2	162	194					
Electorate: 9,980 Valid: 5,132 Spoilt: 37 Quota: 1,027 Turnout: 52.4%

=== Stonehaven and Lower Deeside ===
Stonehaven and Lower Deeside - 4 seats
Party	Candidate	FPv%	Count										
Party	Candidate	FPv%	1	2	3	4	5	6	7	8	9	10	11
Conservative	Wendy Agnew	24.9	1,433										
SNP	Graeme Clark	18.9	1,086	1,107	1,112	1,117	1,126	1,154					
Liberal Democrats	Mike Sullivan	11.0	636	656	657	668	684	700	701	741	797	931	1,105
Conservative	Sandy Wallace	10.9	629	730	735	737	751	760	760	779	823	853	
Liberal Democrats	Peter Bellarby	9.8	563	590	596	605	620	633	633	723	780	880	980
Labour	Bridget O'Hare	8.0	463	470	473	479	482	493	493	524	558		
Independent	Bob Michie	4.9	282	299	314	333	366	430	430	470			
Green	Karen Anne Allan	4.2	242	253	258	264	272	285	286				
Independent	George Alexander Forbes Emslie	2.8	160	177	182	189	201						
Independent	Ken Venters	1.9	108	116	132	139							
Independent	Dermot John Hearty	1.5	85	87	89								
Independent	David Wood	1.3	73	79									
Electorate: 10,770 Valid: 5,760 Spoilt: 90 Quota: 1,153 Turnout: 54.8%

=== Mearns ===
Mearns - 4 seats
Party	Candidate	FPv%	Count							
Party	Candidate	FPv%	1	2	3	4	5	6	7	8
SNP	Jean Dick	23.0	1,262							
Conservative	George Carr	20.5	1,123							
Liberal Democrats	Tom Fleming	16.6	909	940	945	1,046	1,144			
Liberal Democrats	Bill Howatson	13.8	759	775	778	815	850	879	1,021	1,291
Labour	Gill Bayfield	7.1	392	406	407	442	455	459		
Independent	David Nelson	7.1	391	404	407	432	596	601	659	
Independent	Robert Gairn Davidson	6.2	342	355	358	403				
Green	Kate Anderson	5.6	306	336	338					
Electorate: 10,436 Valid: 5,484 Spoilt: 48 Quota: 1,097 Turnout: 53.3%

== Aftermath ==
As no party group had the required 35 seats to have an overall majority, the council remained under no overall control and after negotiations, a coalition was formed between the Liberal Democrats and the Conservatives.

Cllr Ian Tait resigned from the SNP on 28 July 2008 and now sits as an Independent Scottish Nationalist.

Cllr Debra Storr resigned from the Liberal Democrats on 18 November 2008 and on 5 March 2009 she joined the Scottish Green Party. She was a member of the Democratic Independent Group on the council.

Cllr Martin Ford resigned from the Liberal Democrats on 23 November 2008 and on 5 March 2009 he joined the Scottish Green Party. He is a member of the Democratic Independent Group on the council.

On 23 January 2009, Cllr Sam Coull resigned from the Liberal Democrats. Since 5 March 2009 he sits as a member of the Democratic Independent Group

On 23 January 2009, Cllr Paul Johnston left the Liberal Democrat Council Group. He was subsequently expelled from the Liberal Democrats. Since 5 March 2009 he sits as a member of the Democratic Independent Group.

Cllr Andy Ritchie resigned from the SNP on 1 April 2009 and now sits as an independent.

Cllr Mark Cullen is also a member of the Democratic Independent Group on the council.

On 21 February 2012 Banff and District Cllr John Cox ceased to be an independent and joined the Scottish National Party.

=== By-elections ===
==== Troup by-election ====
There was a Troup by-election held on 1 May 2008 to fill the vacancy which arose with the death of the SNP's Michael Burnett on 4 February 2008. The by-election was won by the SNP's Bob Watson.

Troup - 1 seat
Party	Candidate	FPv%	Count
Party	Candidate	FPv%	1
SNP	Bob Watson	62.83	1,721
Conservative	Lisa Watt	18.80	515
Liberal Democrats	Edward Acton	18.36	503
SNP hold		Swing	
Electorate: 7,589 Valid: 2,739 Spoilt: 16 Quota: 1,371 Turnout: 2,755 (36.3%)

==== Aboyne, Upper Deeside and Donside by-election ====
There was an Aboyne, Upper Deeside and Donside by-election held on 23 April 2009 to fill the vacancy which arose with the resignation of the Conservative's Bruce Luffman in 2009. The by-election was won by the Liberal Democrat's Rosemary Bruce.

Aboyne, Upper Deeside and Donside - 1 seat
Party	Candidate	FPv%	Count				
Party	Candidate	FPv%	1	2	3	4	5
Conservative	Jo Pick	31.47	1,144	1,148	1,152	1,241	1,468
Liberal Democrats	Rosemary Bruce	26.66	969	975	981	1,180	1,566
Independent	William Forbes	23.16	842	845	855	1,003	
SNP	George Parkinson	16.97	617	621	636		
BNP	Roy Jones	1.21	44	44			
Independent	David Hutchison	0.52	19				
Liberal Democrats gain from Conservative		Swing					
Electorate: 8,357 Valid: 3,635 Spoilt: 20 Quota: 1,819 Turnout: 3,655 (43.7%)
