= Turriff and District (ward) =

Electoral ward of Aberdeenshire Council, Scotland

- Aberdeenshire Council
- Boundary of Turriff and District in Aberdeenshire from 2017.
- Electorate: 10,429

Current ward
- Created: 2007
- Councillor: Gordon Lang (Conservative)
- Councillor: Anne Stirling (Liberal Democrats)
- Councillor: Alastair Forsyth (SNP)
- Councillor: Iain Taylor (Conservative)

Turriff and District is one of the nineteen wards used to elect members of the Aberdeenshire Council. Until 2017 three councillors were elected in this ward following the fifth statutory Local Government Boundary Commission for Scotland review 2016, now Turriff and District elects four Councillors.

== Councillors ==
Election	Councillors			
2007	Sandy Duncan (SNP / Independent)	Anne Robertson (Liberal Democrats)	Alisan Norrie (Independent)	3 seats
2012	Sandy Duncan (SNP / Independent)	Anne Robertson (Liberal Democrats)	Alisan Norrie (Independent)	3 seats
2017	Sandy Duncan (SNP / Independent)	Anne Robertson (Liberal Democrats)	Alastair Forsyth (SNP)	Iain Taylor (Conservative)
2022	Gordon Lang (Conservative)	Anne Stirling (Liberal Democrats)	Alastair Forsyth (SNP)	Iain Taylor (Conservative)

== Election results ==
=== 2022 election ===
Turriff and District − 4 seats
Party	Candidate	FPv%	Count				
Party	Candidate	FPv%	1	2	3	4	5
Conservative	Iain Walker Taylor (incumbent)	23.8	1,075				
Liberal Democrats	Anne Stirling (incumbent) (Note: Elected in 2017 as Anne Robertson.)	23.5	1,059				
SNP	Alastair Forsyth (incumbent)	17.5	792	798	825	869	1,624
SNP	Susan Dubois	16.4	740	741	751	823	
Conservative	Gordon Lang	15.3	690	839	881	895	904
Green	Kathryn Louise Vincent	3.5	159	161	186		
Electorate: 10,429 Valid: 4,515 Spoilt: 105 Quota: 904 Turnout: 44.3%

=== 2017 Election ===
2017 Aberdeenshire Council election

Turriff and District - 4 seats
Party	Candidate	FPv%	Count				
Party	Candidate	FPv%	1	2	3	4	5
Conservative	Iain Taylor*	37.36%	1,854				
SNP	Alastair Forsyth	25.39%	1,260				
Liberal Democrats	Anne Robertson (incumbent)	19.77%	981	1,324			
Independent	Sandy Duncan (incumbent)	10.96%	544	682	802	918	1,262
Independent	Mike Rawlins	6.53%	324	429	514	559	
Electorate: TBC Valid: 4,963 Spoilt: 52 Quota: 993 Turnout: 46.8%

=== 2012 Election ===
2012 Aberdeenshire Council election

Turriff and District - 3 seats
Party	Candidate	FPv%	Count				
Party	Candidate	FPv%	1	2	3	4	5
SNP	Sandy Duncan (incumbent)	34.24	1,165				
Liberal Democrats	Anne Robertson (incumbent)	18.43	627	652.6	664.7	842.1	999.0
Independent	Alisan Keith Norrie (incumbent)	16.58	564	590.4	609.9	808.8	1,016.9
Conservative	Jayne James Duff	15.93	542	556.6	569.8		
SNP	Colin Graham Mair	12.70	432	658.4	667.7	742.1	
Scottish Christian	Norman Alexander Ogston	2.12	72	74.9			
Electorate: 9,157 Valid: 3,402 Spoilt: 53 Quota: 851 Turnout: 3,455 (37.15%)

=== 2007 Election ===
2007 Aberdeenshire Council election

Turriff and District
Party	Candidate	FPv%	Count				
Party	Candidate	FPv%	1	2	3	4	5
SNP	Sandy Duncan	41.9	1,916				
Conservative	Alistair Duffus Strachan	17.4	796	882	901	932	
Liberal Democrats	Anne Robertson	17.3	790	948	962	1,071	1,372
Independent	Alisan Norrie	16.4	748	900	935	971	1,304
Labour	Ann Marie Sheal	5.1	232	270	279		
BNP	Gary Raikes	1.9	87	119			
Electorate: - Valid: 4,569 Spoilt: 52 Quota: 1,143 Turnout: 53.53%
