= Harriet Cross =

British politician (born 1989)

Harriet Cross MP
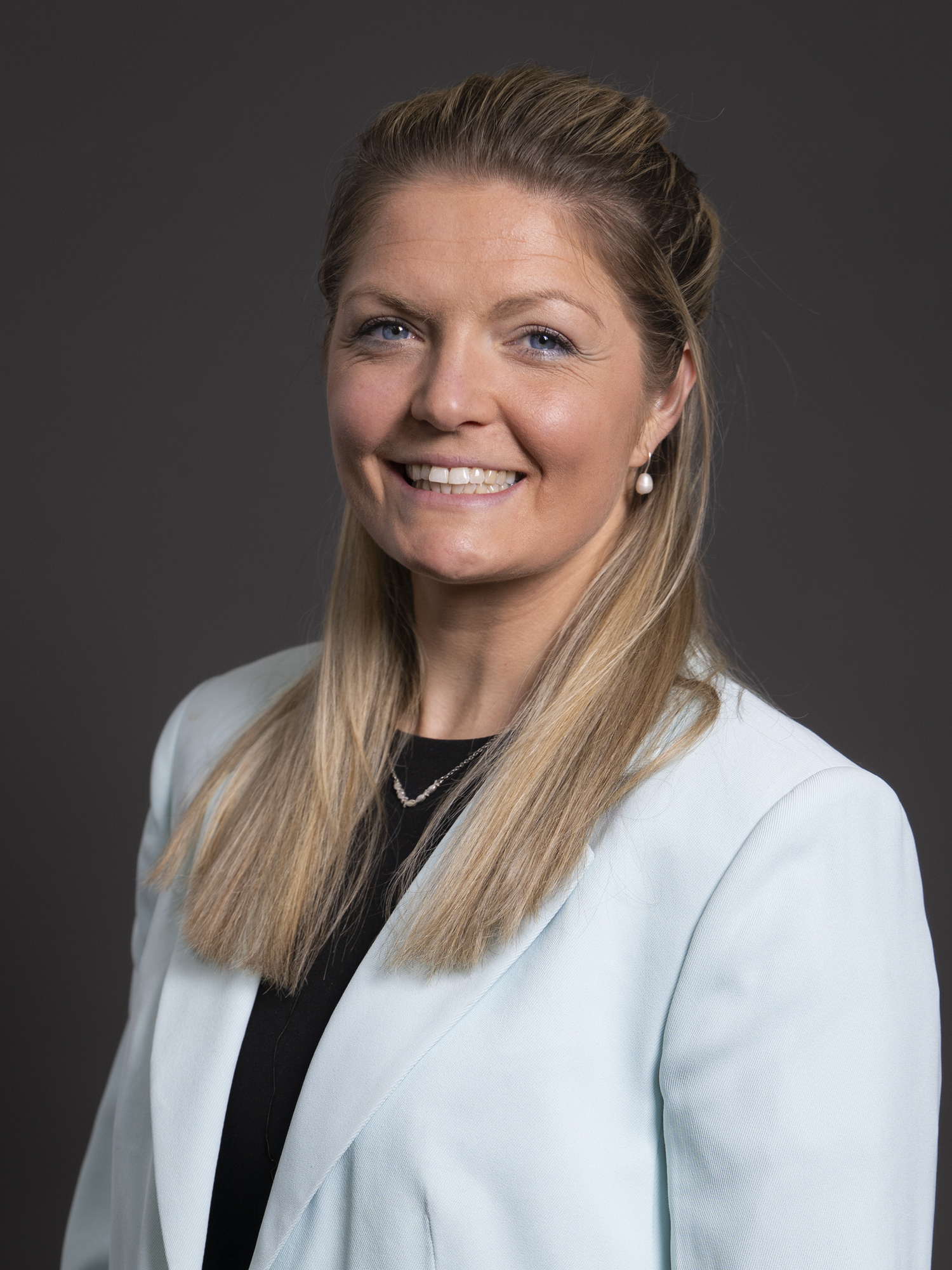
- Official portrait, 2025

Shadow Secretary of State for Scotland Shadow Minister for Energy Security and Net Zero
- Incumbent
- Assumed office 31 August 2026
- Leader: Kemi Badenoch
- Preceded by: Andrew Bowie

Opposition Assistant Whip
- In office 18 November 2024 – 31 August 2026
- Leader: Kemi Badenoch

Member of Parliament for Gordon and Buchan
- Incumbent
- Assumed office 4 July 2024
- Preceded by: Richard Thomson
- Majority: 878 (2.0%)

Personal details
- Born: Harriet Iona Cross; 1989 or 1990 (age 36–37) Harrogate, North Yorkshire, England
- Party: Conservative
- Education: Bandon Grammar School; Imperial College London (BSc); University of Reading (MSc)
- Occupation: Politician; rural surveyor
- Website: www.harrietcross.uk

Harriet Iona Cross (born 1990 or 1991) is a British politician who has served as the Shadow Secretary of State for Scotland since August 2026 and the Member of Parliament for Gordon and Buchan since the 2024 general election. She is a member of the Scottish Conservatives.

== Early life ==
Cross was born in Harrogate, North Yorkshire and grew up in County Cork, Ireland where her mother was from. She attended Bandon Grammar School in Bandon, County Cork before the family moved to Aberdeenshire, owing to her father's work, when she was sixteen. She attended Gordonstoun School, after which she studied zoology at Imperial College London before earning a master's degree in Rural Land and Business Management and from the University of Reading. In 2018, she returned to Aberdeenshire to work as a rural surveyor.

Cross stood as the Conservative candidate for Aberdeen Donside at the 2021 Scottish Parliament election, finishing second to Jackie Dunbar with 9,488 votes (26.42%). She was also ninth on the party list for the North East Scotland region.

== Parliamentary career ==
Cross was elected as the MP for the newly created merged seat of Gordon and Buchan at the 2024 UK general election with a narrow majority of 878 votes. The result was the worst defeat nationwide for the Conservative Party in the history of the UK, eclipsing the 1906 and 1997 landslide defeats for Conservative governments. Prior to 2024, the Banff and Buchan seat was held by the Scottish Conservatives and the Gordon seat held by the SNP. In the 2024 UK Conservative party leadership election she backed Tom Tugendhat.

In September 2024, Cross criticised the Bank of Scotland's proposal to close its Ellon branch, leaving the area without a single bank branch. Despite her opposition to the decision, alongside several members of the community, the sole remaining bank branch in the town permanently closed down on 10 September 2024.

Cross was appointed an Opposition Assistant Whip in November 2024.

In April 2026, Cross became the fastest female MP ever to complete the London Marathon, the previous record holder in that category was Jo Swinson in 2019. Cross finished the race in a time of three hours, twenty one minutes; the previous record was three hours fifty seven minutes. In the same event, the next MP to finish was West Aberdeenshire and Kincardine MP Andrew Bowie, who recorded a time of 3 hours fifty-eight minutes.

In August 2026, Cross was promoted to the shadow cabinet and was appointed the Shadow Secretary of State for Scotland during the 2026 British shadow cabinet reshuffle by Conservative leader Kemi Badenoch.

Parliament of the United Kingdom
| New constituency | Member of Parliament for Gordon and Buchan; 2024–present | Incumbent |
