= Banff and District (ward) =

- Aberdeenshire Council
- Boundary of Banff and District in Aberdeenshire from 2017.
- Electorate: 9,185

Current ward
- Created: 2007
- Councillor: Stewart Adams (Conservative)
- Councillor: Glen Reynolds (SNP)
- Councillor: John Cox (Independent)

Banff and District is one of the nineteen wards used to elect members of the Aberdeenshire Council. It elects three Councillors.

== Councillors ==
Election	Councillors		
2007	Jack Mair (Liberal Democrats)	Ian Gray (SNP)	John Cox (Independent / SNP/ Independent)
2012	Mike Roy (Conservative /Ind.)	Ian Gray (SNP)	John Cox (Independent / SNP/ Independent)
2016	Mike Roy (Conservative /Ind.)	Iain Taylor (Conservative)	John Cox (Independent / SNP/ Independent)
2017	Mike Roy (Conservative /Ind.)	Glen Reynolds (SNP)	John Cox (Independent / SNP/ Independent)
2020	Mike Roy (Conservative /Ind.)	Glen Reynolds (SNP)	John Cox (Independent / SNP/ Independent)
2022	Stewart Adams (Conservative)	Glen Reynolds (SNP)	John Cox (Independent / SNP/ Independent)

== Election results ==
=== 2022 election ===
Banff and District − 3 seats
Party	Candidate	FPv%	Count						
Party	Candidate	FPv%	1	2	3	4	5	6	7
SNP	Glen Reynolds (incumbent)	31.9	1,265						
Conservative	Stewart Adams	27.8	1,103						
Independent	John Cox (incumbent)	19.8	787	834	862	892	921	950	1,023
Independent	Mike Roy (incumbent)	7.2	285	299	318	326	368	401	487
Labour	James Low	5.0	200	224	234	238	294	365	
Liberal Democrats	Sandy Leslie	3.8	150	167	181	199			
Green	Neil Woodward	2.6	105	182	185	214	239		
Alba	Iain Cameron	1.8	73	106	108				
Electorate: 9,185 Valid: 3,968 Spoilt: 34 Quota: 993 Turnout: 43.6%

=== 2017 Election ===
2017 Aberdeenshire Council election

Banff and District - 3 seats
Party	Candidate	FPv%	Count
Party	Candidate	FPv%	1
Conservative	Mike Roy (incumbent)	36.18%	1,509
Independent	John B. Cox (incumbent)	26.18%	1,092
SNP	Glen Reynolds	25.15%	1,049
Liberal Democrats	Alison Simpson	12.49%	521
Electorate: 9,187 Valid: 4,171 Spoilt: 53 Quota: 1,043 Turnout: 46.0%

=== 2016 By-election ===
Banff By-election (3 November 2016) - 1 Seat
Party	Candidate	FPv%	Count
Party	Candidate	FPv%	1
Conservative	Iain Taylor	44.0%	1170
SNP	Glen Reynolds	36.2%	962
Liberal Democrats	Alistair Mason	19.8%	526
Turnout: 29.5%

=== 2012 Election ===
2012 Aberdeenshire Council election

Banff and District - 3 seats
Party	Candidate	FPv%	Count			
Party	Candidate	FPv%	1	2	3	4
SNP	John B. Cox (incumbent)†††††††††	31.24	1,037			
SNP	Ian Gray (incumbent)††††††††	24.19	803	959.7		
Conservative	Mike Roy	23.13	768	780.4	793.5	880.3
Liberal Democrats	Alistair Francis Mason	11.12	369	377.8	405.8	508.6
Scottish Christian	Colin Murray	10.30	342	350.4	375.4	
Electorate: 8,661 Valid: 3,319 Spoilt: 50 Quota: 830 Turnout: 3,369 (38.32%)

=== 2007 Election ===
2007 Aberdeenshire Council election

Banff and District
Party	Candidate	FPv%	Count							
Party	Candidate	FPv%	1	2	3	4	5	6	7	8
SNP	Ian Gray	24.0	1,088	1,092	1,103	1,142				
Liberal Democrats	Jack Mair	15.3	694	704	713	773	773	848	915	1,132
Independent	John Cox††††††††	15.2	691	707	742	791	791	925	1,055	1,257
Conservative	Neil Chalmers	13.6	616	626	640	666	666	741	792	
SNP	Kathryn Parr	11.0	500	509	525	554	558	609		
Independent	Sandy Buchan	8.4	383	398	438	475	475			
Green	Jonny Barton	6.6	298	301	319					
Independent	John Calder	3.8	172	180						
Independent	Ian Page	2.1	94							
Electorate: - Valid: 4,536 Spoilt: 105 Quota: 1,135 Turnout: 53.11%
