= Ellon and District (ward) =

Electoral ward of the Aberdeen Council area, Scotland

- Aberdeenshire Council
- Boundary of Ellon and District in Aberdeenshire from 2017.
- Electorate: 11,837

Current ward
- Created: 2007
- Councillor: John Crawley (Conservative)
- Councillor: Isobel Davidson (Liberal Democrats)
- Councillor: Louise McAllister (SNP)
- Councillor: Gillian Louise Owen (Conservative)

Ellon and District is one of the nineteen wards used to elect members of the Aberdeenshire Council. It elects four Councillors.

== Councillors ==
Election	Councillors			
2007	Rob Merson (SNP)	Isobel Davidson (Liberal Democrats)	Debra Margaret Storr (Liberal Democrats /Green)	Gillian Louise Owen (Conservative)
2009	Rob Merson (SNP)	Isobel Davidson (Liberal Democrats)	Debra Margaret Storr (Liberal Democrats /Green)	Gillian Louise Owen (Conservative)
2012	Rob Merson (SNP)	Isobel Davidson (Liberal Democrats)	Richard Thomson (SNP)	Gillian Louise Owen (Conservative)
2017	Anouk Kloppert (SNP)	Isobel Davidson (Liberal Democrats)	Richard Thomson (SNP)	Gillian Louise Owen (Conservative)
2020	Anouk Kloppert (SNP)	Isobel Davidson (Liberal Democrats)	Louise McAllister (SNP)	Gillian Louise Owen (Conservative)
2022	John Crawley (Conservative)	Isobel Davidson (Liberal Democrats)	Louise McAllister (SNP)	Gillian Louise Owen (Conservative)

== Election results ==
=== 2022 election ===
Ellon and District − 4 seats
Party	Candidate	FPv%	Count						
Party	Candidate	FPv%	1	2	3	4	5	6	7
Liberal Democrats	Isobel Davidson (incumbent)	22.0	1,205						
SNP	Louise McAllister (incumbent)	20.8	1,139						
Conservative	John Crawley	19.1	1,050	1,063	1,064	1,070	1,140		
Conservative	Gillian Owen (incumbent)	16.5	906	935	936	946	993	1,028	1,202
SNP	Josh Gall	10.9	599	612	645	772	871	873	
Labour	Mark Lappin	6.3	348	370	371	444			
Green	Craig William Stewart	4.4	241	255	258				
Electorate: 11,837 Valid: 5,488 Spoilt: 76 Quota: 1,098 Turnout: 47.0%

=== 2020 by-election ===
Ellon & District By-election (15 October 2020) - 1 Seat
Party	Candidate	FPv%	Count			
Party	Candidate	FPv%	1	2	3	4
SNP	Louise Mcallister	42.4	1,683	1,725	1,757	1,916
Conservative	John Crawley	41.7	1,658	1,663	1,679	1,840
Liberal Democrats	Trevor Mason	10.2	405	443	485	
Labour	John Bennett	2.9	114	126		
Green	Peter Kennedy	2.8	112			
Electorate: 11,893 Valid: 3,972 Spoilt: 34 Quota: 1,987 Turnout: 4,006 (33.7%)

=== 2017 election ===
2017 Aberdeenshire Council election

Ellon and District - 4 seats
Party	Candidate	FPv%	Count			
Party	Candidate	FPv%	1	2	3	4
Conservative	Gillian Louise Owen (incumbent)	40.94	2,258			
Liberal Democrats	Isobel Davidson (incumbent)	19.71	1,087	1,703.86		
SNP	Richard Thomson (incumbent)	17.9	987	1,034.02	1,093.74	1,264.34
SNP	Anouk Kloppert	13.93	768	793.55	843.88	1,024.70
Labour	John Morgan	7.52	415	548.39	835.99	
Electorate: TBC Valid: 5,515 Spoilt: 64 Quota: 1,104 Turnout: 5,579 (47.2%)

=== 2012 election ===
2012 Aberdeenshire Council election

Ellon and District - 4 seats
Party	Candidate	FPv%	Count				
Party	Candidate	FPv%	1	2	3	4	5
SNP	Rob Merson (incumbent)	39.04	1,644				
Conservative	Gillian Louise Owen (incumbent)	16.74	705	748.8	761.6	839.4	867.1
Liberal Democrats	Isobel Davidson (incumbent)	16.36	689	760.6	800.9	918.6	
SNP	Richard Thomson	11.26	474	1,055.3			
Labour	Peter Thomas Smyth	9.48	399	426.8	457.8	511.5	531.5
Independent	Sandy Allan	7.12	300	325.8	361.7		
Electorate: 11,173 Valid: 4,211 Spoilt: 51 Quota: 843 Turnout: 4,262 (37.69%)

=== 2007 election ===
2007 Aberdeenshire Council election

Ellon and District
Party	Candidate	FPv%	Count				
Party	Candidate	FPv%	1	2	3	4	5
SNP	Rob Merson	40.5	2,458				
Liberal Democrats	Isobel Davidson	23.2	1,407				
Conservative	Gillian Louise Owen	14.4	872	1,033	1,053	1,197	1,274
Liberal Democrats	Debra Margaret Storr††	8.6	524	777	899	1,049	1,326
Labour	Ann Thorpe	7.5	456	587	599	648	
Independent	Diane Ripley	5.8	352	542	555		
Electorate: - Valid: 6,069 Spoilt: 69 Quota: 1,214 Turnout: 55.37%

== By-election ==
Following the election of Richard Thomson (SNP) to Westminster at the 2019 United Kingdom general election on 12 December and his subsequent resignation as Councillor for Ellon & District ward a by-election was called on Thursday, 15 October 2020.

=== 2020 By-election ===
Ellon & District By-election 2020 - Aberdeenshire Council

Ellon & District - 1 seat
Party	Candidate	FPv%	Count				
Party	Candidate	FPv%	1	2	3	4	5
SNP	Louise McAllister	42.01%	1,683	1,725	1,757	1,916	2,377
Conservative	John Paul Crawley	41.39%	1,658	1,663	1,679	1,840	
Liberal Democrats	Trevor Booth Mason	10.11%	405	443	485		
Labour	John David Bennett	2.85%	114	126			
Green	Peter Alexander Kennedy	2.80%	112				
Electorate: 11,893 Valid: 3,972 Spoilt: 34 Quota: 1,986 Turnout: 33.7%
