= Troup (ward) =

Electoral ward in Aberdeenshire, Scotland

- Aberdeenshire Council
- Boundary of Troup in Aberdeenshire from 2017.
- Electorate: 7,641

Current ward
- Created: 2007
- Councillor: Ross Cassie (SNP)
- Councillor: Richard Menard (Conservative)
- Councillor: Mark Findlater (Conservative)

Troup is one of the nineteen wards used to elect members of the Aberdeenshire Council. It elects three Councillors.

== Councillors ==
| Election | Councillors | | |
|---|---|---|---|
| 2007 | John Duncan (Conservative) | Mitchell Burnett (SNP) | Sydney Mair (Independent) |
| 2008 | John Duncan (Conservative) | Bob Watson (SNP) | Sydney Mair (Independent) |
| 2012 | John Duncan (Conservative) | Hamish Partridge (SNP/ Independent) | Mark Findlater (Independent/ Conservative) |
| 2014 | Ross Cassie (SNP) | Hamish Partridge (SNP/ Independent) | Mark Findlater (Independent/ Conservative) |
| 2017 | Ross Cassie (SNP) | Hamish Partridge (SNP/ Independent) | Mark Findlater (Independent/ Conservative) |
| 2022 | Ross Cassie (SNP) | Richard Menard (Conservative) | Mark Findlater (Independent/ Conservative) |

== Election results ==
=== 2022 election ===
Troup − 3 seats
| Party | Candidate | FPv% | Count | | | | |
| Party | Candidate | FPv% | 1 | 2 | 3 | 4 | 5 |
|---|---|---|---|---|---|---|---|
| Conservative | Mark Findlater (incumbent) | 42.5 | 1,305 | | | | |
| SNP | Ross Cassie (incumbent) | 37.3 | 1,144 | | | | |
| Liberal Democrats | Ian Bailey | 8.5 | 260 | 299 | 378 | 546 | |
| Conservative | Richard Menard | 7.7 | 236 | 647 | 675 | 697 | 894 |
| Green | Simon Scott | 4.1 | 125 | 135 | 300 | | |
Electorate: 7,641 Valid: 3,070 Spoilt: 54 Quota: 768 Turnout: 40.9%

=== 2017 Election ===
2017 Aberdeenshire Council election

Troup - 3 seats
| Party | Candidate | FPv% | Count | | | | | |
| Party | Candidate | FPv% | 1 | 2 | 3 | 4 | 5 | 6 |
|---|---|---|---|---|---|---|---|---|
| Conservative | Mark Findlater (incumbent) | 44.79% | 1,535 | | | | | |
| Independent | Hamish Partridge (incumbent) | 14.97% | 513 | 721 | 759 | 912 | | |
| SNP | Ross Cassie (incumbent) | 20.63% | 707 | 740 | 759 | 795 | 804 | 1,165 |
| SNP | Ricky Taylor | 11.47% | 393 | 406 | 420 | 438 | 443 | |
| Liberal Democrats | Sandy Leslie | 4.17% | 143 | 278 | 355 | | | |
| Labour | Ray Stephen | 3.97% | 136 | 201 | | | | |
Electorate: 7,902 Valid: 3,427 Spoilt: 68 Quota: 857 Turnout: 44.20%

=== 2014 By-election ===
Troup By-election (27 November 2014) - 1 Seat
| Party | Candidate | FPv% | Count | | | | | |
| Party | Candidate | FPv% | 1 | 2 | 3 | 4 | 5 | 6 |
|---|---|---|---|---|---|---|---|---|
| SNP | Ross Cassie | 46.1% | 1,159 | 1,162 | 1,183 | 1,205 | 1,244 | 1,352 |
| Conservative | Iain Taylor | 22.8% | 574 | 580 | 588 | 604 | 645 | 718 |
| Independent | Alan Still | 15.5% | 391 | 408 | 415 | 423 | 446 | |
| Liberal Democrats | Ann Bell | 5.6% | 141 | 141 | 149 | 180 | | |
| Labour | Alan Duffill | 5.6% | 140 | 142 | 148 | | | |
| Green | Darren Duncan | 2.7% | 68 | 69 | | | | |
| Independent | Philip Mitchell | 1.7% | 43 | | | | | |
Valid: 2,516 Quota: 1,259 Turnout: (32.39%)

=== 2012 Election ===
2012 Aberdeenshire Council election

Troup - 3 seats
| Party | Candidate | FPv% | Count | | | | | | |
| Party | Candidate | FPv% | 1 | 2 | 3 | 4 | 5 | 6 | 7 |
|---|---|---|---|---|---|---|---|---|---|
| SNP | Hamish Partridge††††††† | 25.44 | 723 | | | | | | |
| Conservative | John Duncan (incumbent) ††† | 20.87 | 593 | 593.5 | 604.5 | 615.5 | 645.6 | 709.6 | 777.6 |
| Independent | Mark Findlater†††††† | 15.52 | 441 | 441.1 | 446.2 | 479.2 | 520.2 | 683.3 | 796.9 |
| SNP | Bob Watson (incumbent) | 14.25 | 405 | 414.2 | 421.2 | 438.4 | 467.4 | 550.6 | |
| Independent | Sydney Mair (incumbent) | 12.10 | 344 | 344.5 | 346.5 | 366.5 | 393.6 | | |
| Labour | Alan Duffill | 6.51 | 185 | 185.2 | 195.2 | 199.2 | | | |
| Independent | Bill Rebecca | 3.34 | 95 | 95.5 | 108.5 | | | | |
| Liberal Democrats | Sandy Leslie | 1.97 | 56 | 56.1 | | | | | |
Electorate: 7,609 Valid: 2,842 Spoilt: 37 Quota: 711 Turnout: 2,879 (37.35%)

=== 2008 By-election ===
There was a Troup by-election held on 1 May 2008 to fill the vacancy which arose with the death of the SNP's Michael Burnett on 4 February 2008. The by-election was won by the SNP's Bob Watson on 1 May 2008

Troup by-election, 1 May 2008
| Party | Candidate | FPv% | Count |
| Party | Candidate | FPv% | 1 |
|---|---|---|---|
| SNP | Bob Watson | 62.83 | 1,721 |
| Conservative | Lisa Watt | 18.80 | 515 |
| Liberal Democrats | Edward Acton | 18.36 | 503 |
| SNP hold | | Swing | |
Electorate: 7,589 Valid: 2,739 Spoilt: 16 Quota: 1,371 Turnout: 2,755 (36.3%)

=== 2007 Election ===
2007 Aberdeenshire Council election

Troup
| Party | Candidate | FPv% | Count | |
| Party | Candidate | FPv% | 1 | 2 |
|---|---|---|---|---|
| SNP | Mitchell Burnett | 47.7 | 1,798 | |
| Conservative | John Duncan | 24.3 | 914 | 1,060 |
| Independent | Sydney Mair | 20.4 | 770 | 975 |
| Liberal Democrats | Ian Findlay | 7.6 | 286 | 422 |
Electorate: - Valid: 3,768 Spoilt: 53 Quota: 943 Turnout: 50.91%
