= Mearns (ward) =

Electoral ward in Aberdeenshire, Scotland

- Aberdeenshire Council
- Boundary of Mearns in Aberdeenshire from 2017.
- Electorate: 12,414

Current ward
- Created: 2007
- Councillor: Alison Evison (Independent)
- Councillor: Laurie Carnie (Conservative)
- Councillor: George Carr (Conservative)
- Councillor: Tracey Smith (Conservative)

The Mearns is one of the nineteen wards used to elect members of the Aberdeenshire Council. It elects four Councillors.

It takes its name from the Mearns, an old name for the former Kincardineshire (from the Scottish Gaelic A' Mhaoirne meaning "the Stewartry").

== Councillors ==
Election	Councillors			
2007	Bill Howatson (Liberal Democrats)	Tom Fleming (Liberal Democrats)	George Carr (Conservative)	Jean Dick (SNP)
2012	Bill Howatson (Liberal Democrats)	Dave Stuart (Independent)	George Carr (Conservative)	Jean Dick (SNP)
2017	Bill Howatson (Liberal Democrats)	Jeff Hutchison (Conservative)	George Carr (Conservative)	Leigh Wilson (SNP/ Independent/ Alba)
2020	Bill Howatson (Liberal Democrats)	Jeff Hutchison (Conservative)	George Carr (Conservative)	Leigh Wilson (SNP/ Independent/ Alba)
2021	Bill Howatson (Liberal Democrats)	Jeff Hutchison (Conservative)	George Carr (Conservative)	Leigh Wilson (SNP/ Independent/ Alba)
2022	Alison Evison (Independent)	Laurie Carnie (Conservative)	George Carr (Conservative)	Kevin Stelfox (SNP)
2024	Alison Evison (Independent)	Laurie Carnie (Conservative)	George Carr (Conservative)	Tracey Smith (Conservative)

== Election results ==
=== 2024 by-election ===
Mearns by-election (7 November 2024) - 1 seat
Party	Candidate	FPv%	Count			
Party	Candidate	FPv%	1	2	3	4
Conservative	Tracey Smith	39.2	1,347	1,350	1,494	1,768
SNP	Hannah Scott	24.0	823	891	928	1,181
Liberal Democrats	Isobel Knights	21.7	745	788	851	
Reform	Claudia Leith	10.9	375	384		
Green	William Linegar	4.0	136			
Electorate: 12,414 Valid: 3,435 Quota: 1,718 Turnout: 27.8%

=== 2022 election ===
Mearns − 4 seats
Party	Candidate	FPv%	Count									
Party	Candidate	FPv%	1	2	3	4	5	6	7	8	9	10
SNP	Kevin Stelfox	29.0	1,677									
Conservative	George Carr (incumbent)	21.0	1,217									
Independent	Alison Elizabeth McBean Evison (Note: Sitting councillor for North Kincardine.)	10.8	623	663	667	674	699	730	792	894	1,111	1,349
Conservative	Laurie Carnie	10.7	619	625	668	681	689	695	724	741	825	924
Independent	Dave Stewart	8.9	513	546	550	558	573	592	622	672		
Liberal Democrats	Shona Ewen	6.5	377	413	415	418	422	430	561	680	789	
Labour	Yvonne Allan	5.8	336	392	393	396	399	412				
Green	Douglas Fraser	3.4	194	375	376	380	398	447	506			
Alba	Leigh Wilson (incumbent)	1.7	99	171	171	179	186					
Independent	David Allan Neill	1.3	75	86	86	87						
Scottish Family	Diane Elizabeth Laurenson	0.9	52	56	56							
Electorate: 12,170 Valid: 5,782 Spoilt: 57 Quota: 1,157 Turnout: 47.7%

=== 2017 election ===
2017 Aberdeenshire Council election

Mearns - 4 seats
Party	Candidate	FPv%	Count						
Party	Candidate	FPv%	1	2	3	4	5	6	7
Conservative	George Carr (incumbent)	36.19	2,034						
SNP	Leigh Wilson	16.03	901	914.41	935.75	936.02	997.27	1,045.19	1,735.42
SNP	Carole Wise	12.46	700	705.36	715.36	715.57	751.47	815.73	
Liberal Democrats	Bill Howatson (incumbent)	10.66	599	701.79	767.94	772.58	863.53	1,100.31	1,145.13
Independent	Dave Stewart (incumbent)	8.4	472	517.14	546.48	549.66	596.82		
Conservative	Jeff Hutchison	8.2	461	1,116.16	1,141.52				
Green	Karen Allan	4.15	233	248.19	284.09	284.94			
Labour	Patrick Coffield	3.91	220	237.43					
Electorate: TBC Valid: 5,620 Spoilt: 70 Quota: 1,125 Turnout: 5,690 (48.3%)

=== 2012 election ===
2012 Aberdeenshire Council election

Mearns - 4 seats
Party	Candidate	FPv%	Count						
Party	Candidate	FPv%	1	2	3	4	5	6	7
Conservative	George Carr (incumbent)	20.73%	868						
SNP	Jean Dick (incumbent)	20.70%	867						
Liberal Democrats	Bill Howatson (incumbent)	20.03%	839						
SNP	Robert Forbes	10.91%	457	458.3	482.2	482.4	564.1	595.9	
Independent	Dave Stewart	10.29%	431	433.2	434.5	434.7	530.9	684.8	890.5
Conservative	David Nelson	8.93%	374	394.1	395.1	395.3	423.8		
Labour	Gill Bayfield	8.40%	352	353.2	354.5	354.7			
Electorate: 10,963 Valid: 4,188 Spoilt: 35 Quota: 838 Turnout: 4,223 (38.20%)

=== 2007 election ===
2007 Aberdeenshire Council election

Mearns
Party	Candidate	FPv%	Count							
Party	Candidate	FPv%	1	2	3	4	5	6	7	8
SNP	Jean Dick	23.0	1,262							
Conservative	George Carr	20.5	1,123							
Liberal Democrats	Tom Fleming	16.6	909	940	945	1,046	1,144			
Liberal Democrats	Bill Howatson	13.8	759	775	778	815	850	879	1,021	1,291
Labour	Gill Bayfield	7.1	392	406	407	442	455	459		
Independent	David Nelson	7.1	391	404	407	432	596	601	659	
Independent	Robert Gairn Davidson	6.2	342	355	358	403				
Green	Kate Anderson	5.6	306	336	338					
Electorate: Valid: 5,484 Spoilt: 48 Quota: 1,097 Turnout: 53.28%
