= Fraserburgh and District (ward) =

Electoral ward of Aberdeenshire Council, Scotland

- Aberdeenshire Council
- Boundary of Fraserburgh and District in Aberdeenshire from 2017.
- Electorate: 11,584

Current ward
- Created: 2007
- Councillor: Iain Sutherland (Conservative)
- Councillor: Doreen Mair (Independent)
- Councillor: Ann Bell (Liberal Democrats)
- Councillor: James Adams (Conservative)

Fraserburgh and District is one of the nineteen wards used to elect members of the Aberdeenshire Council. It elects four Councillors.

== Councillors ==
Election	Councillors			
2007	Brian Topping (SNP/ Alba)	Ian Tait (SNP /Independent)	Andy Ritchie (SNP/ Ind.)	Michael Watt (Independent)
2009	Brian Topping (SNP/ Alba)	Ian Tait (SNP /Independent)	Andy Ritchie (SNP/ Ind.)	Michael Watt (Independent)
2012	Brian Topping (SNP/ Alba)	Ian Tait (SNP /Independent)	Charles Cummin Buchan (SNP)	Michael Watt (Independent)
2017	Brian Topping (SNP/ Alba)	Doreen Mair (Independent)	Charles Cummin Buchan (SNP)	Andy Kille (Conservative)
2022	Seamus Logan (SNP)	Doreen Mair (Independent)	Ann Bell (Liberal Democrats)	James Adams (Conservative)
2024 by-	Iain Sutherland (Conservative)	Doreen Mair (Independent)	Ann Bell (Liberal Democrats)	James Adams (Conservative)

== Election results ==
=== 2024 by-election ===
Fraserburgh and District by-election (7 November 2024) - 1 seat
Party	Candidate	FPv%	Count				
Party	Candidate	FPv%	1	2	3	4	5
Conservative	Iain Sutherland	36.3	1,145	1,158	1,225	1,556	1,884
SNP	Mike McDonald	28.4	895	915	966	1,113	
Reform	Conrad Ritchie	25.9	817	829	864		
Liberal Democrats	Sandy Leslie	7.0	222	233			
Scottish Family	Dawn Smith	2.2	71				
Electorate: 11,584 Valid: 3,150 Quota: 1,576 Turnout: 27.4%

=== 2022 election ===
Fraserburgh and District − 4 seats
Party	Candidate	FPv%	Count					
Party	Candidate	FPv%	1	2	3	4	5	6
Conservative	James Adams	32.4	1,526					
Independent	Doreen Mair (incumbent)	32.1	1,509					
SNP	Seamus Logan	20.0	941					
Alba	Brian Topping (incumbent)	5.8	274	312	385	396		
Liberal Democrats	Ann Bell	4.8	228	402	557	574	650	883
Independent	Paul Greenall	3.9	182	269	423	444	553	
Scottish Family	John McColl	0.9	43	76	94			
Electorate: 11,604 Valid: 4,703 Spoilt: 40 Quota: 941 Turnout: 40.9%

=== 2017 election ===
2017 Aberdeenshire Council election

Fraserburgh and District - 4 seats
Party	Candidate	FPv%	Count								
Party	Candidate	FPv%	1	2	3	4	5	6	7	8	9
Conservative	Andy Kille	24.10%	1,229								
Independent	Doreen Mair	14.57%	743	781	790	873	950	1,061			
SNP	Charles Cummin Buchan (incumbent)	12.04%	614	617	758	783	811	855	859	910	999
SNP	Brian Topping (incumbent)	12.78%	652	653	709	731	763	776	780	827	968
Independent	Ian Tait (incumbent)	9.73%	496	529	532	564	590	637	644	743	
Independent	Michael Watt (incumbent)	6.45%	329	352	359	397	429	470	478		
Liberal Democrats	Ann Bell	5.14%	262	292	299	313	362				
Labour	Kenneth Watt	5.23%	267	282	287	311					
Independent	Charlie Reid	4.94%	252	258	267						
SNP	David Donn	5.02%	256	257							
Electorate: TBC Valid: 5,100 Spoilt: 93 Quota: 1,021 Turnout: 42.9%

=== 2012 election ===
2012 Aberdeenshire Council election

Fraserburgh and District - 4 seats
Party	Candidate	FPv%	Count								
Party	Candidate	FPv%	1	2	3	4	5	6	7	8	9
SNP	Brian Topping (incumbent)	25.1	1,056								
SNP	Charles Cummin Buchan	16.72	704	787.7	792.9	802.1	817.7	1,040.6			
Independent	Ian Tait (incumbent)	14.65	617	637.2	644.6	666.9	723.6	733.9	759.3	836.1	993.3
Independent	Michael Watt (incumbent)	9.90	417	432.3	446.3	466.5	515.5	528.9	547.7	627.9	783.6
Independent	Doreen Mair	8.81	371	379.5	410.5	436.7	470.9	483.3	498.3	625.9	
Liberal Democrats	Ann Bell	7.65	322	326.8	334.0	361.4	420.1	427.3	446.3		
Conservative	Bob Sim	6.15	259	261.6	266.6	275.6					
SNP	Ricky Sheaffe-Greene	4.89	206	270.3	273.5	280.7	282.7				
Labour	Ashara Taylor	4.08	172	173.6	176.8						
Independent	George Esslemont	2.07	87	88.2							
Electorate: 11,117 Valid: 4,211 Spoilt: 65 Quota: 843 Turnout: 4,276 (37.88%)

=== 2007 election ===
2007 Aberdeenshire Council election

Fraserburgh and District
Party	Candidate	FPv%	Count						
Party	Candidate	FPv%	1	2	3	4	5	6	7
SNP	Brian Topping	27.1	1,487						
SNP	Ian Tait†	20.6	1,131						
Independent	Michael Watt	15.1	831	865	869	890	918	1,041	1,370
SNP	Andy Ritchie††††††	14.5	795	1,022	1,037	1,046	1,060	1,090	1,165
Independent	Dennis Duthie	9.3	509	520	522	554	587	728	
Conservative	Bob Sim	8.5	466	482	484	490	522		
Liberal Democrats	Dominique-Paul Lonchay	3.0	164	167	168	171			
Independent	James Milne	2.0	109	116	116				
Electorate: - Valid: 5,492 Spoilt: 168 Quota: 1,099 Turnout: 51.83%
