= Inverurie and District (ward) =

Electoral ward of the Aberdeenshire council area, Scotland

- Aberdeenshire Council
- Boundary of Inverurie and District in Aberdeenshire from 2017.
- Electorate: 12,128

Current ward
- Created: 2007
- Councillor: Neil Baillie (SNP)
- Councillor: Judy Margaret Whyte (Independent)
- Councillor: Marion Ewenson (Liberal Democrats)
- Councillor: David Keating (Conservative)

Inverurie and District is one of the nineteen wards used to elect members of the Aberdeenshire Council. It elects four Councillors.

== Councillors ==
Election	Councillors			
2007	Bryan Hunter Stuart (SNP)	Mike Raeburn Lonchay (Liberal Democrats)	Martin Kitts-Hayes (Liberal Democrats)	Richard Cowling (Conservative)
2012	Bryan Hunter Stuart (SNP)	Hamish Vernal (SNP)	Martin Kitts-Hayes (Liberal Democrats)	Richard Cowling (Conservative)
2017	Neil Baillie (SNP)	Judy Margaret Whyte (Independent)	Marion Ewenson (Liberal Democrats)	Colin Clark (Conservative)
2017 by-	Neil Baillie (SNP)	Judy Margaret Whyte (Independent)	Marion Ewenson (Liberal Democrats)	Lesley Berry (Conservative /Ind.)
2020	Neil Baillie (SNP)	Judy Margaret Whyte (Independent)	Marion Ewenson (Liberal Democrats)	Lesley Berry (Conservative /Ind.)
2022	Neil Baillie (SNP)	Judy Margaret Whyte (Independent)	Marion Ewenson (Liberal Democrats)	David Keating (Conservative)

== Election results ==
=== 2022 election ===
Inverurie and District − 4 seats
Party	Candidate	FPv%	Count	
Party	Candidate	FPv%	1	2
Conservative	David Keating (Note: Sitting councillor for East Garioch.)	25.7	1,276	
SNP	Neil Baillie (incumbent)	24.1	1,200	
Independent	Judy Margaret Whyte (incumbent)	22.5	1,120	
Liberal Democrats	Marion Ewenson (incumbent)	17.0	843	1,003
SNP	Archie Peebles	6.9	343	348
Green	Denise May Rothnie	3.8	187	195
Electorate: 12,128 Valid: 4,969 Spoilt: 83 Quota: 994 Turnout: 41.7%

=== 2017 By-election ===
Inverurie & District By-election (12 October 2017) - 1 Seat
Party	Candidate	FPv%	Count			
Party	Candidate	FPv%	1	2	3	4
Conservative	Lesley Berry	48.53%	1,672	1,679	1,715	1,871
SNP	Elaine Mitchell	33.27%	1,146	1,161	1,234	1,300
Liberal Democrats	Scott Bremner	8.56%	295	309	412	
Labour	Sarah Flavell	8.01%	276	290		
Green	Craig Stewart	1.62%	56			
Electorate: NA Valid: 3,445 Spoilt: 26 Quota: 1,723 Turnout: 30.9%

=== 2017 Election ===
2017 Aberdeenshire Council election

Inverurie and District - 4 seats
Party	Candidate	FPv%	Count			
Party	Candidate	FPv%	1	2	3	4
Conservative	Colin Clark (incumbent)†	35.95	1,732			
SNP	Neil Baillie	22.52	1,085			
Independent	Judy Margaret Whyte	20.38	982			
Liberal Democrats	Marion Ewenson	11.79	568	951.1	958.69	965.63
SNP	Bryan Hunter Stuart (incumbent)	5.09	245	261.41	360.1	362.9
Labour	Sarah Flavell	4.28	206	265.42	269.77	271.69
Electorate: TBC Valid: 4,818 Spoilt: 48 Quota: 964 Turnout: 4,866 (43.3%)

=== 2016 by-election ===
Inverurie and District By-election (3 November 2016) - 1 Seat
Party	Candidate	FPv%	Count
Party	Candidate	FPv%	1
Conservative	Colin Clark	38.8%	1,302
SNP	Neil Baillie	34.6%	1,164
Liberal Democrats	Alison Auld	22.5%	755
Labour	Sarah Flavell	4.1%	139
Turnout: 30.4%

=== 2012 Election ===
2012 Aberdeenshire Council election

Inverurie and District - 4 seats
Party	Candidate	FPv%	Count						
Party	Candidate	FPv%	1	2	3	4	5	6	7
SNP	Bryan Hunter Stuart (incumbent)	19.7	688	701					
SNP	Hamish Vernal	17.5	612	621	621.8	643.8	685.8	690.2	806.2
Conservative	Richard Cowling (incumbent)	17.4	608	614	614.0	636.0	684.0	692.1	771.4
Liberal Democrats	Martin Christopher Kitts-Hayes (incumbent) ††	17.3	606	632	632.0	660.0	730.0		
Labour	Ellis Thorpe	13.2	463	477	477.1	503.1	562.1	568.9	
Independent	Mike Raeburn (incumbent)	6.0	211	225	225.0	300.0			
Independent	Ron Reid	5.6	196	212	212.0				
Green	Karen A. MacKenzie	3.2	113						
Electorate: 10,034 Valid: 3,497 Spoilt: 59 Quota: 700 Turnout: 3,556 (34.85%)

=== 2007 Election ===
2007 Aberdeenshire Council election

Inverurie and District
Party	Candidate	FPv%	Count					
Party	Candidate	FPv%	1	2	3	4	5	6
SNP	Bryan Hunter Stuart	29.6	1,515					
Liberal Democrats	Mike Raeburn	25.7	1,316					
Liberal Democrats	Martin Kitts-Hayes	16.9	865	975	1,172			
Conservative	Richard Cowling	14.9	762	823	837	864	928	1,190
Labour	Ellis Thorpe	11.1	567	637	659	693	737	
Independent	John Sangster	1.7	87	165	175	192		
Electorate: - Valid: 5,148 Spoilt: 86 Quota: 1,030 Turnout: 56.32%

== By-election ==
Following the election of Colin Clark (Scottish Conservative and Unionist Party) to Westminster at the 2017 United Kingdom general election on 8 June and his subsequent resignation as Councillor for Inverurie & District ward, a by-election was called on Thursday, 12 October 2017.

=== 2017 By-election ===
Inverurie & District By-election 2017 - Aberdeenshire Council

Inverurie & District - 1 seat
Party	Candidate	FPv%	Count			
Party	Candidate	FPv%	1	2	3	4
Conservative	Lesley Berry	48.17%	1,672	1,679	1,715	1,871
SNP	Elaine Mitchell	33.02%	1,146	1,161	1,234	1,300
Liberal Democrats	Scott James Bremner	8.50%	295	309	412	
Labour	Sarah Flavell	7.95%	276	290		
Green	Craig Stewart	1.61%	56			
Electorate: 11,233 Valid: 3,445 Spoilt: 26 Quota: 1,723 Turnout: 30.9%
