= East Garioch (ward) =

- Aberdeenshire Council
- Boundary of East Garioch in Aberdeenshire from 2017.
- Electorate: 10,414

Current ward
- Created: 2007
- Councillor: Trevor Booth Mason (Liberal Democrats)
- Councillor: Glen Reid (SNP)
- Councillor: Jim Gifford (Independent)
- Councillor: Dominic Lonchay (Reform)

East Garioch is one of the nineteen wards used to elect members of the Aberdeenshire Council. Until 2017 three councillors were elected in this ward following the fifth statutory Local Government Boundary Commission for Scotland review 2016, now East Garioch elects four Councillors.

== Councillors ==
Election	Councillors			
2007	Fergie Hood (SNP/ Liberal Democrats)	Nan Cullinane (Liberal Democrats)	Martin Anthony Ford (Liberal Democrats /Greens)	3 seats
2012	Fergie Hood (SNP/ Liberal Democrats)	Nan Cullinane (Liberal Democrats)	Martin Anthony Ford (Liberal Democrats /Greens)	3 seats
2017	Fergie Hood (SNP/ Liberal Democrats)	Glen Reid (SNP)	Martin Anthony Ford (Liberal Democrats /Greens)	Dominic Lonchay (Conservative/ Reform UK)
2021	David Keating (Conservative)	Glen Reid (SNP)	Martin Anthony Ford (Liberal Democrats /Greens)	Dominic Lonchay (Conservative/ Reform UK)
2022	Trevor Booth Mason (Liberal Democrats)	Glen Reid (SNP)	Jim Gifford (Independent)	Dominic Lonchay (Conservative/ Reform UK)
2025	Trevor Booth Mason (Liberal Democrats)	Glen Reid (SNP)	Jim Gifford (Independent)	

== Election results ==
=== 2022 election ===
East Garioch − 4 seats
Party	Candidate	FPv%	Count				
Party	Candidate	FPv%	1	2	3	4	5
SNP	Glen Reid (incumbent)	41.0	1,727				
Conservative	Dominic Lonchay (incumbent)	27.4	1,156				
Liberal Democrats	Trevor Booth Mason	9.4	398	564	649	720	1,041
Labour	Rosanna Dobbin	7.7	323	496	538	595	
Independent	Jim Gifford (Note: Sitting councillor for Mid-Formartine.)	7.6	321	441	502	763	871
Independent	Drew Cullinane	6.9	290	438	476		
Electorate: 10,414 Valid: 4,215 Spoilt: 24 Quota: 844 Turnout: 40.7%

=== 2021 By-election ===
East Garioch By-election (17 June 2021) - 1 Seat
Party	Candidate	FPv%	Count			
Party	Candidate	FPv%	1	2	3	4
Conservative	David Keating	45.5	1,240	1,261	1,268	1,394
SNP	Dan Ritchie	35.3	963	982	1,058	1,146
Liberal Democrats	Trevor Mason	10.3	281	319	365	
Green	Jamie Ogilvie	4.8	130	143		
Labour	Andy Brown	4.1	111			
Electorate: 10,445 Valid: 2,725 Spoilt: 15 Quota: 1,363 Turnout: 26.2%

=== 2017 Election ===
2017 Aberdeenshire Council election

East Garioch - 4 seats
Party	Candidate	FPv%	Count					
Party	Candidate	FPv%	1	2	3	4	5	6
Conservative	Dominic Lonchay	31.34	1,429					
Green	Martin Anthony Ford (incumbent)	18.64	850	921.27				
Liberal Democrats	Fergie Hood (incumbent)	18.47	842	1,077.53				
SNP	Glen Reid	15.09	688	695.96	706.30	707.68	752.38	1,360.51
SNP	Conor McKay	12.52	571	577.87	590.28	591.88	658.89	
Labour	Ann Thorpe	3.93	179	228.57	294.78	297.37		
Electorate: 10175 Valid: 4,559 Spoilt: 37 Quota: 912 Turnout: 4,596 (45.17%)

=== 2012 Election ===
2012 Aberdeenshire Council election

East Garioch - 3 seats
Party	Candidate	FPv%	Count					
Party	Candidate	FPv%	1	2	3	4	5	6
SNP	Fergie Hood (incumbent) †	35.0	1,140					
Green	Martin Anthony Ford (incumbent)	20.3	660	732.1	784.8	834.9		
Liberal Democrats	Nan Cullinane (incumbent)	15.9	519	574.6	643.7	790.3	798.3	1,080.3
Conservative	Patrick Sleigh	11.0	359	384.7	402.9			
Independent	Amanda Louise Clark	10.4	338	393.9	467.3	569.1	575.1	
Labour	Ann Thorpe	7.4	240	279.1				
Electorate: 9,224 Valid: 3,256 Spoilt: 24 Quota: 815 Turnout: 3,280 (35.56%)

=== 2007 Election ===
2007 Aberdeenshire Council election

East Garioch
Party	Candidate	FPv%	Count			
Party	Candidate	FPv%	1	2	3	4
SNP	Fergie Hood	31.9	1,420			
Liberal Democrats	Martin Anthony Ford†††	23.7	1,054	1,118		
Liberal Democrats	Nan Cullinane	21.8	968	1,025	1,030	1,206
Conservative	Gordon Naismith	15.5	687	726	726	769
Labour	Sheila Henderson	7.1	317	345	345	
Electorate: 8195 Valid: 4,446 Spoilt: 56 Quota: 1,112 Turnout: 4,502 (54.94%)

== By-election ==
The by-election was held on 17 June 2021, following the death of Councillor Fergus Hood following a prolonged illness.

=== 2021 By-election ===
East Garioch By-election 2021 - Aberdeenshire Council

East Garioch - 1 seat
Party	Candidate	FPv%	Count			
Party	Candidate	FPv%	1	2	3	4
Conservative	David Keating	45.50%	1,240	1,278	1,285	1,411
SNP	Dan Ritchie	35.34%	963	982	1,058	1,146
Liberal Democrats	Trevor Booth Mason	10.31%	281	319	365	
Green	Jamie Ogilvie	4.77%	130	143		
Labour	Andy Brown	4.07%	111			
Electorate: 10,445 Valid: 2,725 Spoilt: 15 Quota: 1,363 Turnout: 26.2%
