= Peterhead South and Cruden (ward) =

Aberdeenshire council ward

- Aberdeenshire Council
- Boundary of Peterhead South and Cruden in Aberdeenshire from 2017.
- Electorate: 9,135

Current ward
- Created: 2007
- Councillor: Stephen Smith (SNP)
- Councillor: Angus Mathson (SNP)
- Councillor: Colin Alexander Simpson (Liberal Democrats)

Peterhead South and Cruden is one of the nineteen wards used to elect members of the Aberdeenshire Council. It elects three Councillors.

== Councillors ==
Year	Councillors		
2007	Stephen Smith (SNP)	Stuart Pratt (SNP)	Sam Coull (Liberal Democrats/ Independent)
2012	Stephen Smith (SNP)	Stuart Pratt (SNP)	Sam Coull (Liberal Democrats/ Independent)
2017	Stephen Smith (SNP)	Alan Lascelles Fakley (Conservative)	Stephen Calder (Independent)
2022	Stephen Smith (SNP)	George Hall (Conservative)	Colin Alexander Simpson (Liberal Democrats)
2026	Stephen Smith (SNP)	Angus Matheson(SNP)	Colin Alexander Simpson (Liberal Democrats)

== Election results ==
=== 2026 by-election ===
Peterhead South and Cruden by-election (2 July 2026) - 1 seat
Party	Candidate	FPv%	Count
Party	Candidate	FPv%	1
SNP	Angus Matheson	36.5	741
Reform	Andy Curwen	22.9	465
Conservative	Ross Gibb	21.3	432
Independent	John Ross	7.4	150
Independent	Ross Thomson	6.5	132
Liberal Democrats	Tony Ware	2.8	56
Scottish Family	Dave Bestwick	2.7	54
Electorate: 9,206 Valid: 2,043 Quota: 1,022 Turnout: 22.2%

=== 2022 election ===
Peterhead South and Cruden − 3 seats
Party	Candidate	FPv%	Count			
Party	Candidate	FPv%	1	2	3	4
SNP	Stephen William Smith (incumbent)	46.5	1,578			
Conservative	George Hall (Note: In 2023, Cllr Hall left the Conservatives to sit as an independent.)	32.5	1,105			
Liberal Democrats	Colin Alexander Simpson	12.2	414	783	796	1,110
Conservative	Neil Johnstone	8.8	298	371	595	
Electorate: 9,135 Valid: 3,395 Spoilt: 59 Quota: 849 Turnout: 37.8%

=== 2017 Election ===
2017 Aberdeenshire Council election

Peterhead South and Cruden - 3 seats
Party	Candidate	FPv%	Count				
Party	Candidate	FPv%	1	2	3	4	5
Conservative	Alan Lascelles Fakley	37.00%	1,364				
SNP	Stephen William Smith (incumbent)	21.35%	787	801	828	857	1,384
Independent	Stephen Calder	15.16%	559	618	719	909	932
SNP	Stuart Wallace Pratt (incumbent)	15.16%	559	567	583	616	
Independent	Sam Coull	7.40%	273	351	416		
Liberal Democrats	Colin Simpson	5.07%	187	289			
Electorate: TBC Valid: 3,687 Spoilt: 82 Quota: 922 Turnout: 40.8%

=== 2012 Election ===
2012 Aberdeenshire Council election

Peterhead South and Cruden - 3 seats
Party	Candidate	FPv%	Count					
Party	Candidate	FPv%	1	2	3	4	5	6
SNP	Stephen William Smith (incumbent)	34.05	1,030					
SNP	Stuart Wallace Pratt (incumbent)	18.64	564	765.2				
Independent	Sam Coull (incumbent)	15.17	459	477.0	478.6	520.7	603.6	
Independent	Tom Malone	13.82	418	426.5	427.2	592.3	693.9	998.6
Conservative	Steve Owen	9.59	290	296.9	297.2	319.5		
Independent	Peter Stevenson	8.73	264	277.3	278.2			
Electorate: 8,621 Valid: 3,025 Spoilt: 64 Quota: 757 Turnout: 3,089 (35.09%)

=== 2007 Election ===
2007 Aberdeenshire Council election

Peterhead South and Cruden
Party	Candidate	FPv%	Count				
Party	Candidate	FPv%	1	2	3	4	5
SNP	Stephen Smith	29.4	1,205				
SNP	Stuart Pratt	21.6	888	1,016	1,032		
Liberal Democrats	Sam Coull††††	21.0	861	870	894	895	1,032
Independent	Raymond Matthew	13.0	535	542	637	638	767
Conservative	Steven Owen	10.3	422	425	443	443	
Independent	Veronica Johnston	4.7	193	196			
Electorate: - Valid: 4,104 Spoilt: 108 Quota: 1,027 Turnout: 48.11%
