= Central Buchan (ward) =

Electoral ward of the Aberdeen Council area, Scotland

- Aberdeenshire Council
- Boundary of Central Buchan in Aberdeenshire from 2017.
- Electorate: 11,408

Current ward
- Created: 2007
- Councillor: Peter Chapman (Conservative)
- Councillor: Geoff Crowson (SNP)
- Councillor: Anne Simpson (Liberal Democrats)
- Councillor: Hannah Powell (Conservative)

Central Buchan is one of the nineteen wards used to elect members of the Aberdeenshire Council. It elects four Councillors.

== Councillors ==
Election	Councillors			
2007	Sandy Stronach (SNP)	Norman Smith (Independent)	Albert Howe (Independent)	Peter Chapman (Conservative)
2012	Jim Ingram (SNP)	Norman Smith (Independent)	Lenny Pirie (SNP)	Edie Chapman (Conservative)
2017	Jim Ingram (SNP)	Norman Smith (Independent)	Anne Simpson (Liberal Democrats)	Marion Buchan (Conservative)
2022	David Mair (SNP)	Geoff Crowson (SNP)	Anne Simpson (Liberal Democrats)	Hannah Powell (Conservative)
2024 by-	Peter Chapman (Conservative)	Geoff Crowson (SNP)	Anne Simpson (Liberal Democrats)	Hannah Powell (Conservative)

== Election results ==
=== 2024 by-election ===
Central Buchan by-election (7 November 2024) - 1 seat
Party	Candidate	FPv%	Count				
Party	Candidate	FPv%	1	2	3	4	5
Conservative	Peter Chapman	41.3	1,260	1,272	1,292	1,430	1,614
SNP	Sarah Wilken	28.5	869	879	897	925	1,069
Liberal Democrats	Ian Bailey	14.3	435	452	463	507	
Reform	Andrew Curwen	10.8	331	338	358		
Scottish Family	Phil Reynolds	2.7	83	89			
Independent	Dean Ward	2.3	71				
Electorate: 11,408 Valid: 3,049 Quota: 1,525 Turnout: 27.0%

=== 2022 election ===
Central Buchan − 4 seats
Party	Candidate	FPv%	Count								
Party	Candidate	FPv%	1	2	3	4	5	6	7	8	9
Conservative	Hannah Powell	18.7	871	883	885	889	902	1,020			
SNP	David Mair	16.0	744	750	774	797	812	862	864	866	901
SNP	Geoff Crowson	15.1	705	710	740	788	810	843	844	845	881
Conservative	Steve Owen	14.6	679	690	693	697	714	759	831	834	
Liberal Democrats	Anne Simpson (incumbent)	13.0	607	613	617	641	715	946			
Independent	Norman Smith (incumbent)	11.3	527	535	551	561	597				
Labour	Arif Mahmood	4.6	213	215	223	239					
Green	Jamie Cole-Hamilton	2.9	135	138	145						
Alba	Charlotte Diana Cross	2.4	111	117							
Scottish Family	Joanna Moore	1.4	65								
Electorate: 11,170 Valid: 4,657 Spoilt: 85 Quota: 932 Turnout: 42.5%

=== 2017 election ===
2017 Aberdeenshire Council election

Central Buchan - 4 seats
Party	Candidate	FPv%	Count				
Party	Candidate	FPv%	1	2	3	4	5
Conservative	Marion Buchan	37.28%	1,808				
SNP	Jim Ingram (incumbent)	24.50%	1,188				
Independent	Norman Smith (incumbent)	17.79%	863	1,133			
Liberal Democrats	Anne Simpson	10.41%	505	760	777	854	1,169
SNP	Lenny Pirie (incumbent)	10.02%	486	518	700	728	
Electorate: TBC Valid: 4,850 Spoilt: 66 Quota: 971 Turnout: 44.3%

=== 2012 election ===
2012 Aberdeenshire Council election

Central Buchan - 4 seats
Party	Candidate	FPv%	Count					
Party	Candidate	FPv%	1	2	3	4	5	6
SNP	Jim Ingram	29.23	1,141					
Independent	Norman Smith (incumbent)	20.70	808					
Conservative	Edie Chapman	19.9	780	791.7				
SNP	Lenny Pirie	11.68	456	746.9	751.4	752.6	768.1	801.0
Liberal Democrats	Anne Simpson	5.64	220	233.3	236.6	238.5	258.2	302.8
Labour	Carol Donald	5.25	205	215.4	216.6	226.4		
Independent	Hugh Livingstone	4.82	188	198.4	206.1	207.9	256.2	302.8
Independent	David S. Ross	2.72	106	112.6	118.6			
Electorate: 10,231 Valid: 3,904 Spoilt: 50 Quota: 781 Turnout: 3,954 (38.16%)

=== 2007 election ===
2007 Aberdeenshire Council election

Central Buchan
Party	Candidate	FPv%	Count							
Party	Candidate	FPv%	1	2	3	4	5	6	7	8
SNP	Sandy Stronach	20.2	1,096							
Independent	Norman Smith	19.4	1,054	1,054	1,080	1,142				
Conservative	Peter Chapman	17.2	933	933	974	1,022	1,031	1,087		
Independent	Albert Howe	14.6	790	790	822	911	933	1,016	1,016	1,283
SNP	Norma Thomson	13.2	718	726	771	804	812	870	870	
Labour	Carol Donald	5.9	318	318	363	378	381			
Independent	Jim Conn	4.9	265	265	290					
Liberal Democrats	Betty May	4.7	253	253						
Electorate: - Valid: 5,427 Spoilt: 91 Quota: 1,086 Turnout: 55.42%
