= Aberdeenshire West =

Constituency of the Scottish Parliament

- County constituency for the Scottish Parliament
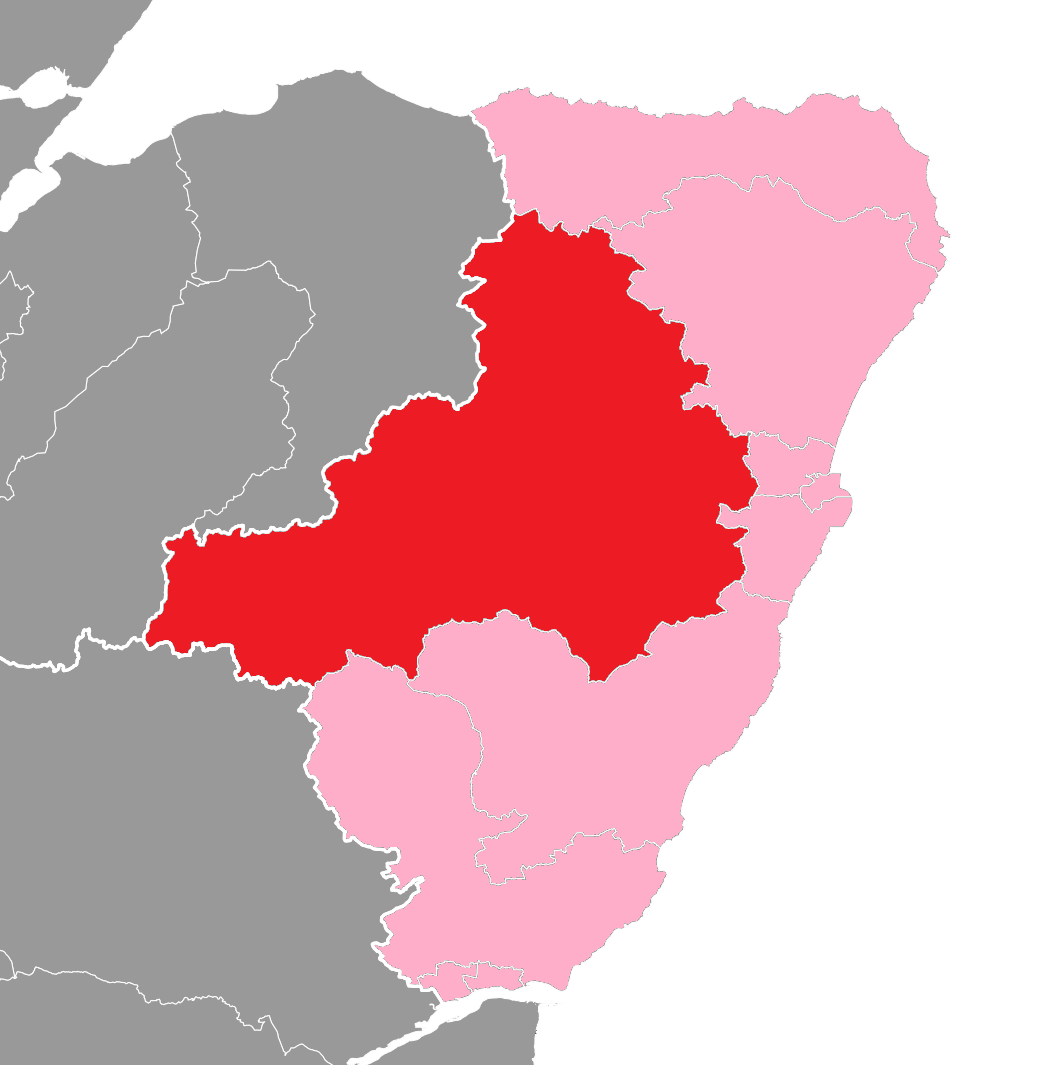

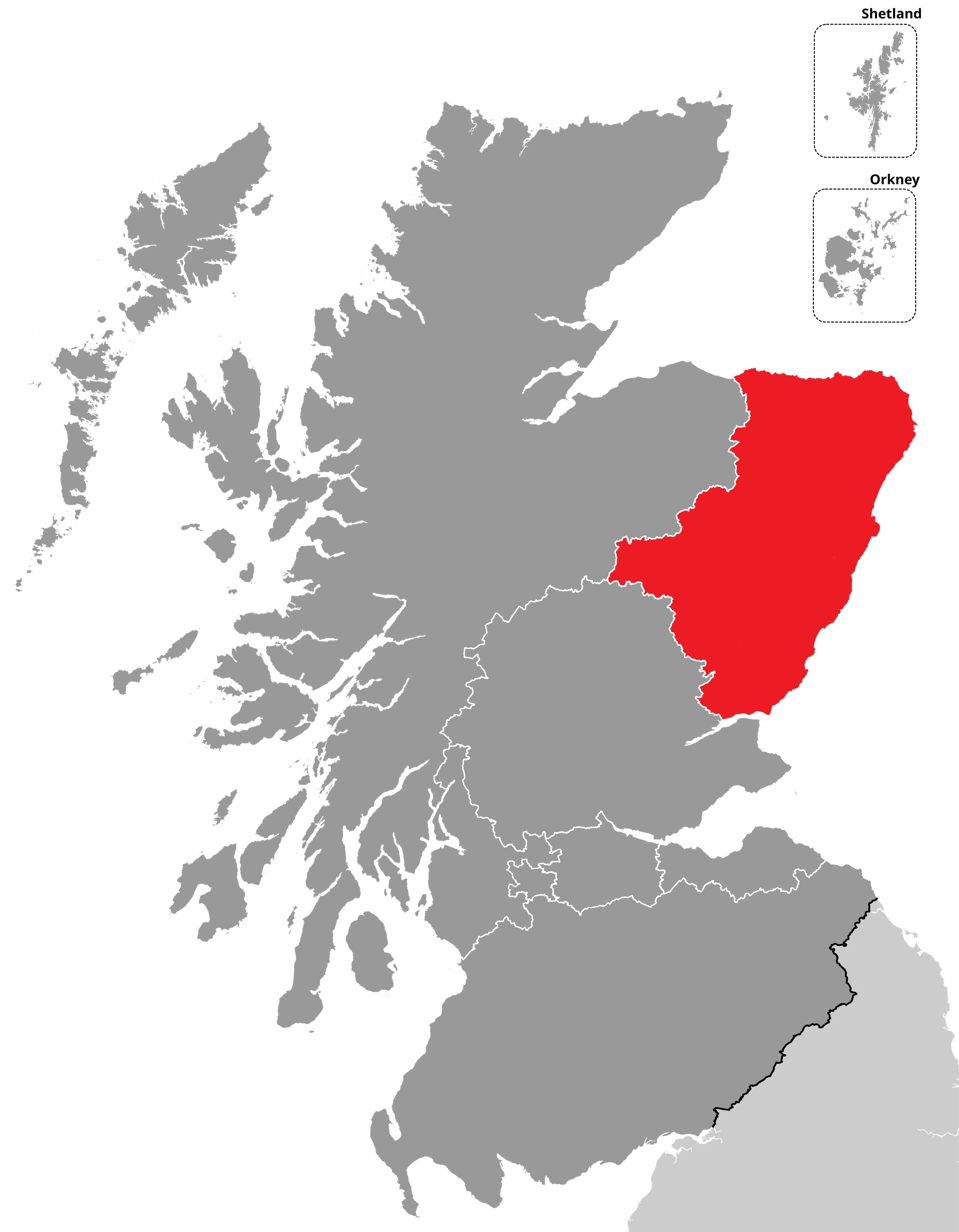
- Aberdeenshire West shown within the North East Scotland electoral region and the region shown within Scotland
- Electoral region: North East Scotland
- Electorate: 61,255 (2026)

Current constituency
- Created: 2011
- Party: Conservative
- MSP: Alexander Burnett
- Council area: Aberdeenshire
- Created from: Gordon, West Aberdeenshire and Kincardine

Aberdeenshire West (Gaelic: Siorrachd Obar Dheathain an Iar) is a county constituency of the Scottish Parliament covering part of the council area of Aberdeenshire. Under the additional-member electoral system used for elections to the Scottish Parliament, it elects one Member of the Scottish Parliament (MSP) by the first past the post method of election. It is also one of ten constituencies in the North East Scotland electoral region, which elects seven additional members in addition to the ten constituency MSPs, producing a form of proportional representation for the region as a whole.

The seat has been held by Alexander Burnett of the Scottish Conservatives since the 2016 Scottish Parliament election.

== Electoral region ==
The other nine constituencies of the North East Scotland region are: Aberdeen Central, Aberdeen Deeside and North Kincardine, Aberdeen Donside, Aberdeenshire East, Angus North and Mearns, Angus South, Banffshire and Buchan Coast, Dundee City East, and Dundee City West. The region covers all of the Aberdeen City council area, the Aberdeenshire council area, the Angus council area, the Dundee City council area and part of the Moray council area.

== Constituency boundaries and council area ==
Constituency boundaries

Aberdeenshire is represented by five constituencies in the Scottish Parliament: Aberdeen Deeside and North Kincardine, Aberdeenshire East, Aberdeenshire West, Angus North and Mearns, and Banffshire and Buchan Coast.

Aberdeenshire West was created ahead of the 2011 Scottish Parliament election from parts of the former constituencies of Gordon and West Aberdeenshire and Kincardine by the first periodic review of Scottish Parliament boundaries. It remained unchanged following the second periodic review of Scottish Parliament boundaries. The constituency comprises the following wards of Aberdeenshire Council:

- West Garioch (entire ward)
- Westhill and District (entire ward)
- Huntly, Strathbogie and Howe of Alford (entire ward)
- Aboyne, Upper Deeside and Donside (entire ward)
- Banchory and Mid-Deeside (entire ward)
- East Garioch (shared with Aberdeenshire East ),
- Stonehaven and Lower Deeside (shared with Angus North and Mearns)

== Constituency profile and voting patterns ==
=== Constituency profile ===
The Aberdeenshire West constituency is an affluent rural constituency located in the western part of the Aberdeenshire council area. To the south of the constituency is Royal Deeside, located along the Valleys of the River Dee, which includes the affluent village of Aboyne and town of Banchory and their surrounding rural areas. Along the western end of Royal Deeside is the Cairngorms National Park, covering the royal estate of Balmoral Castle. North-east of Deeside is the town of Westhill, which functions as a suburb to the city of Aberdeen. North of here, along the Valleys of the River Don in the area known as "Gordon", is Huntly, home to the Gordon Highlanders, and the former Royal Burgh of Kintore, which has developed into an Aberdonian suburb, with a near doubling of the town's population throughout the 2000s. The constituency is among the least deprived parts of Scotland, with slight deprivation in the south-west of Huntly, and high rates of affluence elsewhere.

Oil and agriculture form a significant part of the local economy, with tourist interests around Royal Deeside. The constituency also covers the Royal Lochnagar distillery located to the west of Royal Deeside.

=== Voting patterns ===
The Aberdeenshire West constituency was formed in 2011 from parts of the former constituencies of Gordon and West Aberdeenshire and Kincardine. From the establishment of the Scottish Parliament in 1999 until 2007 these constituencies were both represented by the Liberal Democrats. In 2007, Gordon was gained by the SNP's Alex Salmond, who served as the First Minister of Scotland from 2007 until 2014.

In the 2012 local council election, the Conservative vote in areas covered by the Aberdeenshire West constituency tended to be strongest around Royal Deeside, covering the villages of Aboyne, Ballater and town of Banchory, and to a lesser extent around Westhill and its surrounding areas. The rural region of Garioch, situated along the River Don and its tributary streams, tended to be better for the SNP and Liberal Democrats.

== Member of the Scottish Parliament ==
Election	Member	Party
2011	Dennis Robertson	SNP
2016	Alexander Burnett	Conservative

== Election results ==
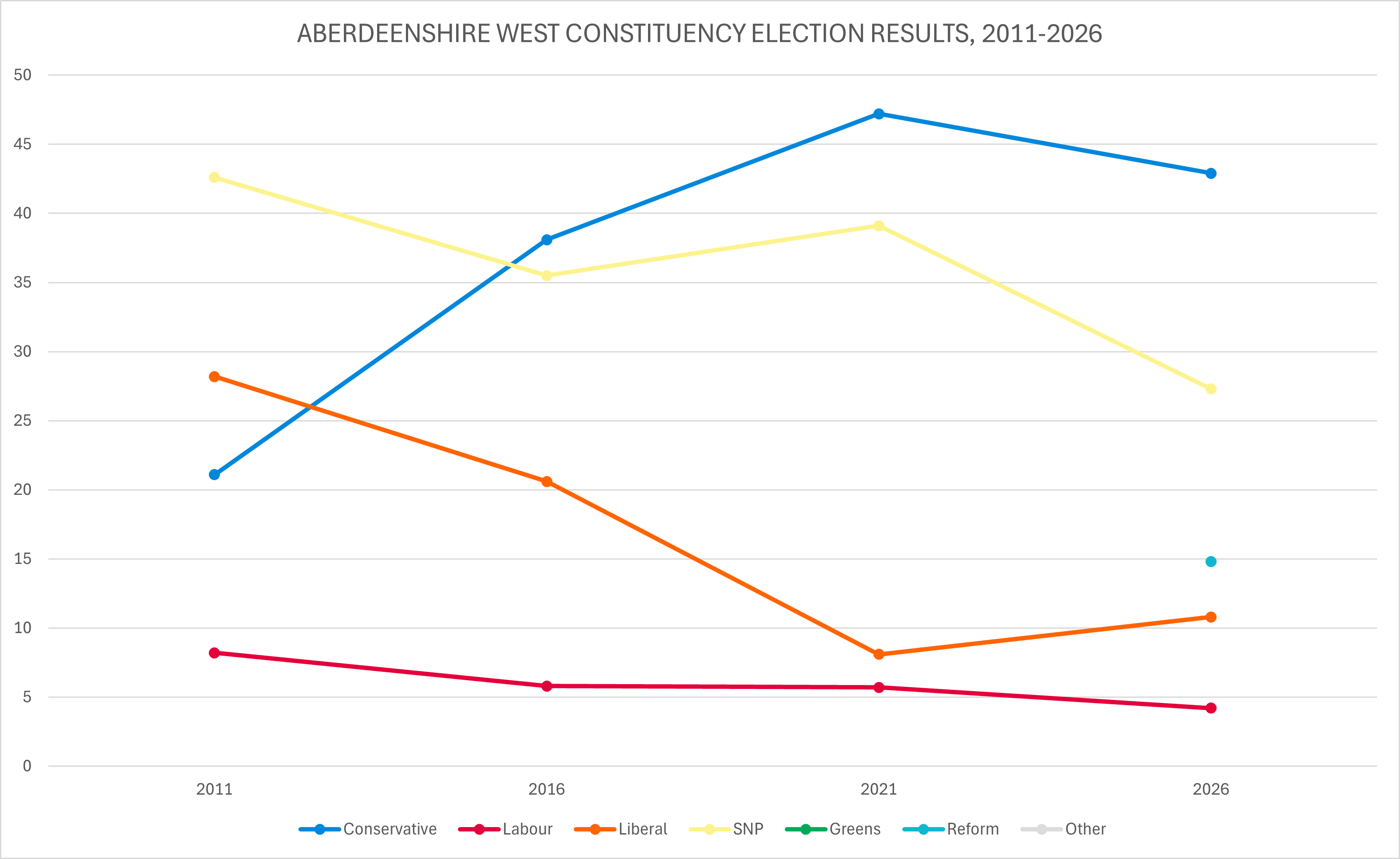
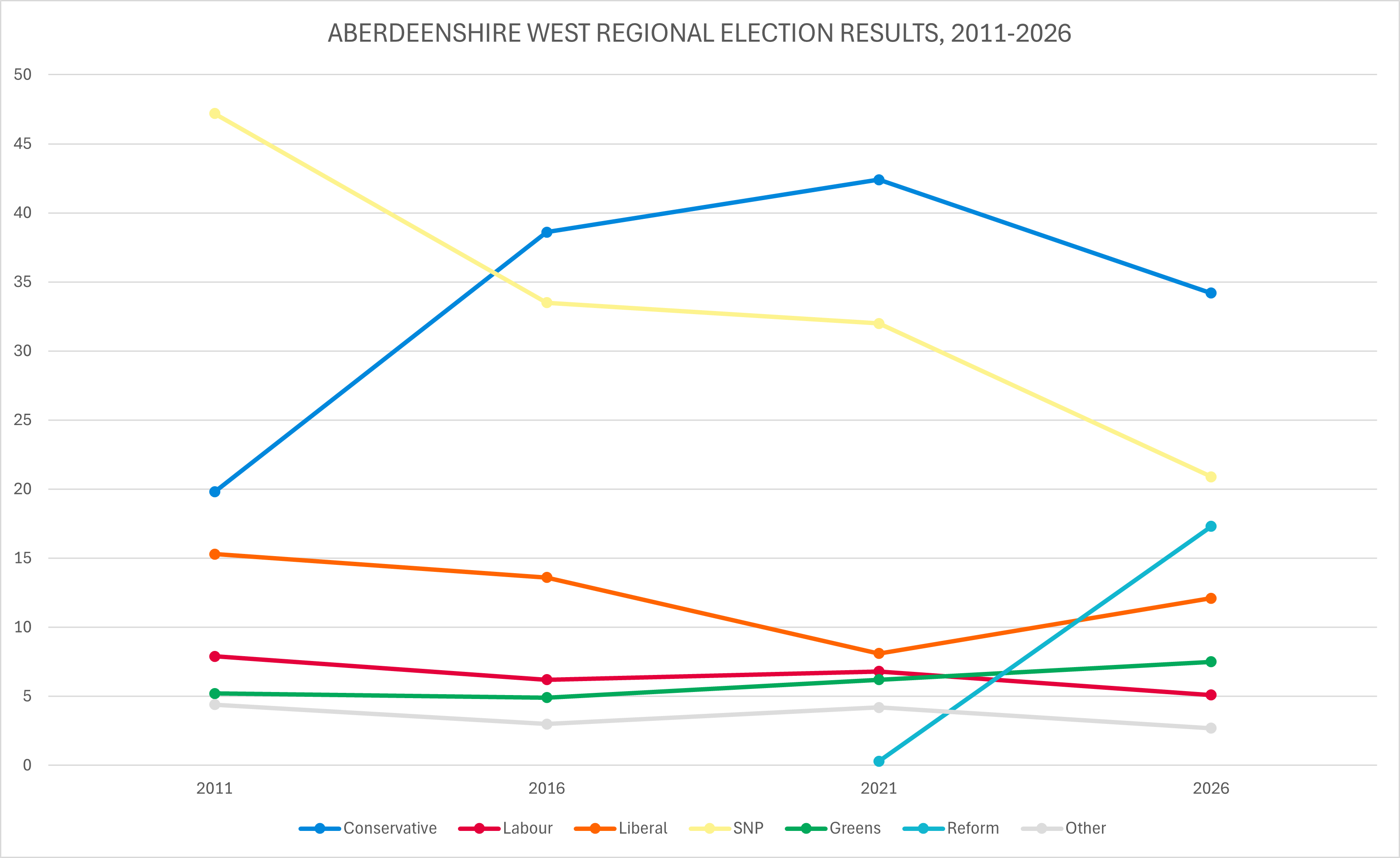

=== 2020s ===
2026 Scottish Parliament election: Aberdeenshire West
Party	Candidate	Constituency			Regional		
Party	Candidate	Votes	%	±%	Votes	%	±%
Conservative	Alexander Burnett (Note: Incumbent member for this constituency)	15,897	42.9	▼4.3	12,695	34.2	▼8.2
SNP	Fatima Joji	10,113	27.3	▼11.8	7,753	20.9	▼11.1
Reform	Jo Hart	5,467	14.8	New	6,401	17.3	▲17.0
Liberal Democrats	Jeff Goodhall	3,995	10.8	▲2.7	4,501	12.1	▲4.0
Green					2,793	7.5	▲1.3
Labour	Kate Blake	1,569	4.2	▼1.5	1,894	5.1	▼1.7
Scottish Family					237	0.6	▲0.1
AtLS					202	0.5	New
Independent Green Voice					181	0.5	Steady
ISP					143	0.4	New
Independent	Marie Boulton				110	0.3	New
Scottish Socialist					52	0.1	New
Workers Party					50	0.1	New
Advance UK					40	0.1	New
Independent	Iris Leask				24	0.1	New
Majority		5,784	15.6	▲7.5			
Valid votes		37,041			37,076		
Invalid votes		124			74		
Turnout		37,165	60.7	▼9.0	37,150	60.7	▼9.0
Conservative hold		Swing					
Notes

2021 Scottish Parliament election: Aberdeenshire West
Party	Candidate	Constituency			Regional		
Party	Candidate	Votes	%	±%	Votes	%	±%
Conservative	Alexander Burnett (Note: Incumbent member for this constituency)	19,709	47.2	▲9.1	17,700	42.4	▲3.7
SNP	Fergus Mutch	16,319	39.1	▲3.6	13,379	32.0	▼1.5
Liberal Democrats	Rosemary Bruce	3,363	8.1	▼12.5	3,375	8.1	▼5.6
Labour	Andy Brown	2,382	5.7	▼0.1	2,856	6.8	▲0.6
Green					2,569	6.2	▲1.3
Alba					668	1.6	New
All for Unity					214	0.5	New
Independent Green Voice					212	0.5	New
Scottish Family					205	0.5	New
Abolish the Scottish Parliament					140	0.3	New
Reform					119	0.3	New
Freedom Alliance (UK)					108	0.3	New
Scottish Libertarian					101	0.2	▲0.1
UKIP					57	0.1	▼1.6
Restore Scotland					54	0.1	New
Independent	Laura Marshall				31	0.1	New
Independent	Geoffrey Farquharson				16	0.0	New
Renew					10	0.0	New
Majority		3,390	8.1	▲5.6			
Valid votes		41,773			40,761		
Invalid votes		116			79		
Turnout		41,889	69.7	▲10.5	41,893	69.7	▲10.5
Conservative hold		Swing		▲10.8			

=== 2010s ===
2016 Scottish Parliament election: Aberdeenshire West
Party	Candidate	Constituency			Regional		
Party	Candidate	Votes	%	±%	Votes	%	±%
Conservative	Alexander Burnett	13,400	38.1	▲17.0	13,606	38.6	▲18.9
SNP	Dennis Robertson (Note: Incumbent member for this constituency)	12,500	35.5	▼7.0	11,807	33.5	▼13.7
Liberal Democrats	Mike Rumbles	7,262	20.6	▼7.6	4,804	13.6	▼1.6
Labour	Sarah Duncan	2,036	5.8	▼2.4	2,184	6.2	▼1.7
Green					1,719	4.9	▼0.3
UKIP					613	1.7	▲0.6
Scottish Christian					214	0.6	▼0.1
National Front					78	0.2	0.0
Solidarity					70	0.2	▲0.2
RISE					49	0.1	New
Scottish Libertarian					48	0.1	New
Communist					41	0.1	New
Majority		900	2.6	N/A			
Valid votes		35,198			35,233		
Invalid votes		83			51		
Turnout		35,281	59.2	▲5.8	35,284	59.2	▲5.8
Conservative gain from SNP		Swing		▲12.0			
Notes

2011 Scottish Parliament election: Aberdeenshire West
Party	Candidate	Constituency			Region		
Party	Candidate	Votes	%	±%	Votes	%	±%
SNP	Dennis Robertson	12,186	42.6	N/A	13,528	47.2	N/A
Liberal Democrats	Mike Rumbles (Note: Incumbent member on the party list, or for another constituency)	8,074	28.2	N/A	4,375	15.3	N/A
Conservative	Nanette Milne	6,027	21.1	N/A	5,666	19.8	N/A
Labour	Jean Morrison	2,349	8.2	N/A	2,267	7.9	N/A
Green					1,494	5.2	N/A
All-Scotland Pensioners Party					358	1.2	N/A
UKIP					324	1.1	N/A
Scottish Christian					202	0.7	N/A
BNP					151	0.5	N/A
Independent	John Cox				70	0.2	N/A
National Front					63	0.2	N/A
Scottish Socialist					59	0.2	N/A
Socialist Labour					53	0.2	N/A
Independent	David Henderson				31	0.1	N/A
Independent	Andrew McBride				14	0.0	N/A
Solidarity					8	0.0	N/A
Angus Independents					6	0.0	N/A
Majority		4,112	14.4	N/A			
Valid votes		28,636			28,669		
Invalid votes		113			77		
Turnout		28,749	53.5	N/A	28,746	53.5	N/A
SNP win (new seat)							
