= Huntly, Strathbogie and Howe of Alford (ward) =

Electoral ward of the Aberdeen Council area, Scotland

- Aberdeenshire Council
- Boundary of Huntly, Strathbogie and Howe of Alford in Aberdeenshire from 2017.
- Electorate: 12,148

Current ward
- Created: 2007
- Councillor: Gwyneth Petrie (SNP)
- Councillor: Robbie Withey (Independent)
- Councillor: Jeff Goodhall (Liberal Democrats)
- Councillor: Lauren Knight (Conservative)

Huntly, Strathbogie and Howe of Alford is one of the nineteen wards used to elect members of the Aberdeenshire Council. It elects four Councillors.

== Councillors ==
Election	Councillors			
2007	Joanna Strathdee (SNP)	Richard C Stroud (Liberal Democrats)	Alistair Ross (Liberal Democrats)	Moira Ingleby (Conservative)
2012	Joanna Strathdee (SNP)	John Latham/ (Independent)	Alistair Ross (Liberal Democrats)	Moira Ingleby (Conservative)
2015	Gwyneth Petrie (SNP)	John Latham/ (Independent)	Margo Stewart (Conservative)	Moira Ingleby (Conservative)
2017	Gwyneth Petrie (SNP)	Robbie Withey (Conservative/ Independent)	John Latham (Liberal Democrats)	Moira Ingleby (Conservative)
2022	Gwyneth Petrie (SNP)	Robbie Withey (Conservative/ Independent)	Jeff Goodhall (Liberal Democrats)	Lauren Knight (Conservative)

== Election results ==
=== 2022 election ===
Huntly, Strathbogie and Howe of Alford − 4 seats
Party	Candidate	FPv%	Count						
Party	Candidate	FPv%	1	2	3	4	5	6	7
SNP	Gwyneth Petrie (incumbent)	34.5	1,945						
Conservative	Lauren Knight	26.5	1,491						
Conservative	Robbie Withey (incumbent) (Note: Councillor Robbie Withey was suspended from the Conservative Party in April 2022 after it was alleged he grabbed a man by the throat. As this was after the close of nomination of candidates for the election in May, he still appeared on the ballot as a Conservative candidate.)	14.0	788	820	1,047	1,055	1,092	1,094	1,277
Liberal Democrats	Jeff Goodhall	13.9	784	976	1,021	1,033	1,143		
Labour	Bryan Scott Begg	7.8	441	630	651	655	728	735	
Independent	Rosie Leagas	2.7	152	264	276	298			
Scottish Libertarian	Stuart Whitby	0.6	34	58	62				
Electorate: 12,148 Valid: 5,635 Spoilt: 79 Quota: 1,128 Turnout: 47.0%

=== 2017 Election ===
2017 Aberdeenshire Council election

Huntly, Strathbogie and Howe of Alford - 4 seats
Party	Candidate	FPv%	Count					
Party	Candidate	FPv%	1	2	3	4	5	6
Conservative	Moira Ingleby (incumbent)	30.69	1,741					
Conservative	Robbie Withey	20.43	1,159					
Liberal Democrats	John Latham (incumbent)	17.54	995	1,212.54				
SNP	Gwyneth Petrie (incumbent)	15.78	895	924.24	930.54	931.06	994.03	1,639.02
SNP	Kate Monahan	10.38	589	594.92	601.66	602.01	701.6	
Labour	Bryan Begg	5.18	294	363.27	390.63	396.05		
Electorate: TBC Valid: 5,673 Spoilt: 112 Quota: 1,135 Turnout: 5,785 (47.8%)

=== 2015 By-election ===
Huntly, Strathbogie and Howe of Alford By-election (5 November 2015) - 2 Seats
Party	Candidate	FPv%	Count
Party	Candidate	FPv%	1
Conservative	Margo Stewart	36.3%	1,469
SNP	Gwyneth Petrie	35.4%	1,433
Liberal Democrats	David Millican	22.9%	928
Labour	Sarah Flavell	4.8%	196
Scottish Libertarian	Derek Scott	0.5%	20
Valid: 4,046 Spoilt: 50 Quota: 1,349 Turnout: 4,096 (34.5%)

=== 2012 Election ===
2012 Aberdeenshire Council election

Huntly, Strathbogie and Howe of Alford - 4 seats
Party	Candidate	FPv%	Count					
Party	Candidate	FPv%	1	2	3	4	5	6
Conservative	Moira Ingleby (incumbent)	26.47%	1,091					
SNP	Joanna Strathdee (incumbent)††††	20.14%	830					
Liberal Democrats	Alastair Ross (incumbent)†††††	18.24%	752	831.2				
SNP	Tom Murray	14.56%	600	620.2	620.97	624.8	683.8	
Independent	John Latham	14.39%	593	650.8	653.2	653.4	760.6	995.9
Green	Jake Williams	6.21%	256	274.3	275.6	275.9		
Electorate: 11,265 Valid: 4,122 Spoilt: 48 Quota: 825 Turnout: 4,170 (36.59%)

=== 2007 Election ===
2007 Aberdeenshire Council election

Huntly, Strathbogie and Howe of Alford
Party	Candidate	FPv%	Count						
Party	Candidate	FPv%	1	2	3	4	5	6	7
SNP	Joanna Strathdee	30.7	1,839						
Conservative	Moira Ingleby	27.3	1,635						
Liberal Democrats	Richard C Stroud	16.4	978	1,077	1,145	1,170	1,280		
Liberal Democrats	Alistair Ross	13.6	812	907	979	1,012	1,088	1,143	1,378
Labour	Bryan Begg	6.3	375	424	444	456	501	508	
Green	Jake Williams	4.2	251	340	376	421			
Independent	David Hutchison	1.5	91	135	177				
Electorate: Valid: 5,981 Spoilt: 82 Quota: 1,197 Turnout: 54.68%
