= Kincardine and Mearns =

Committee area of Aberdeenshire, Scotland

Coordinates: 57.035°N 2.307°W

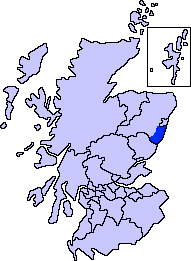
Map of Scotland showing the present-day committee area of Kincardine and Mearns

Kincardine and Mearns is one of six area committees of the Aberdeenshire council area in Scotland. It has a population of 38,506 (2001 Census). There are significant natural features in this district including rivers, forests, mountains and bogs (known locally as mosses).

Transport links with Aberdeen have encouraged rapid population growth, especially in the north of this region. Existing settlements such as Portlethen and Stonehaven have greatly expanded, along with industrial activity. The southern part is more self-sufficient, with the fertile Mearns area sustaining a strong agricultural economy. Small scale tourism activity occurs along its attractive coastline and former fishing villages.

== Kincardine and Deeside district ==
Between 1975 and 1996 Kincardine and Deeside was a local government district within the Grampian region. Its area included all of the pre-1975 county of Kincardineshire apart from Nigg in the northeast which was covered by the City of Aberdeen district. As the name suggested, it also included the large geographical area of the drainage basin of the River Dee from the southern section of Aberdeenshire. In 1996, this district became part of Aberdeenshire unitary authority in the local government reorganisation.

Aberdeenshire Council subsequently established the Kincardine and Mearns area committee covering the North Kincardine, Stonehaven and Lower Deeside and Mearns wards, which together cover the majority but not all of the pre-1975 county of Kincardineshire.

== History ==
In medieval times, the northern part of the area known as Kincardine comprised the Thanedom of Cowie and the Thanedom of Durris. The Mearns was described as an earldom. Each of these thanages was with the Crown as late as 1264 AD. In the Middle Ages the principal roadway connecting Stonehaven to Aberdeen was known as the Causey Mounth; this drovers' road was constructed in some places with large boulders in order to span certain boggy stretches.

During the Scottish Enlightenment period, Lord Monboddo operated a large agricultural estate in the Mearns, at which location he conducted considerable research in agricultural improvement; Monboddo was best known as a jurist on the Court of Session, as the father of modern historical linguistics and a pre-evolutionary thinker.

== Notable architecture ==
- Dunnottar Castle, Muchalls Castle and Fetteresso Castle are located within this district.
- Kincardine Castle, a Victorian 'arts and crafts' country house in the village of Kincardine O'Neil.
- In the village of Muchalls at Victorian times there existed a large hotel, which fell into ruin in the latter 20th century; the site has now been used for housing.
- There are numerous prehistoric stone circles, standing stones and cairns within this geographic unit.

== Geography and landforms ==
Rivers and streams in Kincardine and Mearns include the Burn of Elsick, Burn of Pheppie, Burn of Muchalls, Cowie Water, Carron Water and Bervie Water, all of which discharge to the North Sea. Pictish stones and evidence of a Pictish hillfort have been found at Dunnicaer, a sea stack just north of Dunnottar Castle.

== Other notable features ==
- Fowlsheugh Nature Reserve
- Causey Mounth
