= Peterhead North and Rattray (ward) =

Electoral ward of the Aberdeen Council area, Scotland

- Aberdeenshire Council
- Boundary of Peterhead North and Rattray in Aberdeenshire from 2017.
- Electorate: 11,821

Current ward
- Created: 2007
- Councillor: Leanne McWhinnie (SNP)
- Councillor: Dianne Beagrie (Independent)
- Councillor: Alan Buchan (Reform)
- Councillor: Matthew James (Conservative)

Peterhead North and Rattray is one of the nineteen wards used to elect members of the Aberdeenshire Council. It elects four Councillors.

== Councillors ==
Election	Councillors			
2007	Anne Allan (SNP)	Fiona McRae (SNP)	Alan Buchan (Independent / Reform UK) (Note: Elected as Independent councillor; defected to Reform UK in 2026.)	Robert Thomas (Conservative)
2012	Anne Allan (SNP)	Fiona McRae (SNP)	Alan Buchan (Independent / Reform UK)	Alan Gardiner (Independent)
2017	Anne Allan (SNP)	Dianne Beagrie (Conservative / Independent) (Note: Elected as Conservative councillor; became an independent in 2022.)	Alan Buchan (Independent / Reform UK)	Ian Sutherland (Independent)
2022	Leanne McWhinnie (SNP)	Dianne Beagrie (Conservative / Independent)	Alan Buchan (Independent / Reform UK)	Matthew James (Conservative)
2026	Leanne McWhinnie (SNP)	Dianne Beagrie (Conservative / Independent)	Alan Buchan (Independent / Reform UK)	Matthew James (Conservative)

== Election results ==
=== 2022 election ===
Peterhead North and Rattray − 4 seats
Party	Candidate	FPv%	Count						
Party	Candidate	FPv%	1	2	3	4	5	6	7
SNP	Leanne McWhinnie	29.1	1,222						
Independent	Dianne Beagrie (incumbent)	23.2	974						
Conservative	Matthew James	14.3	599	610	626	633	637	665	1,125
Independent	Alan S. Buchan (incumbent)	13.0	548	605	631	679	741	823	877
Conservative	Iain Sutherland (incumbent)	12.5	523	536	554	563	571	589	
Liberal Democrats	Kevin Robert Anderson	3.7	156	202	208	225	258		
Alba	Trish McPherson	2.4	99	189	194	215			
Independent	Sharon Bradford	1.9	79	116	141				
Electorate: 11,821 Valid: 4,200 Spoilt: 68 Quota: 841 Turnout: 36.1%

=== 2017 election ===
2017 Aberdeenshire Council election

Peterhead North and Rattray - 4 seats
Party	Candidate	FPv%	Count					
Party	Candidate	FPv%	1	2	3	4	5	6
Conservative	Dianne Beagrie	41.33%	1,899					
SNP	Anne Allan (incumbent)	22.02%	1,012					
Independent	Alan S. Buchan (incumbent)	12.77%	587	855	861	925		
Independent	Iain Sutherland	9.64%	443	658	661	728	731	972
SNP	Fiona McRae (incumbent)	11.95%	549	593	667	689	690	
Liberal Democrats	Alistair Massey	2.29%	105	228	230			
Electorate: TBC Valid: 4,595 Spoilt: 95 Quota: 920 Turnout: 39.0%

=== 2012 election ===
2012 Aberdeenshire Council election

Peterhead North and Rattray - 4 seats
Party	Candidate	FPv%	Count								
Party	Candidate	FPv%	1	2	3	4	5	6	7	8	9
SNP	Anne Allan (incumbent)	17.35	618	620	628	647	812				
Independent	Alan S. Buchan (incumbent)	16.47	587	592	623	676	704	716.9			
SNP	Fiona McRae (incumbent)	14.9	534	544	555	561	717				
Independent	Alan Gardiner	14.85	529	548	569	625	646	654.2	654.5	656.5	827.1
Conservative	Sheena Drunsfield	12.55	447	455	470	504	525	531.3	531.5	532.1	
SNP	Michael Doig	11.01	394	400	406	430					
Independent	Stephen William Calder	5.42	193	203	223						
Labour	Thomas Phillips	4.72	168	181							
Liberal Democrats	Graham Smith	2.58	92								
Electorate: 10,787 Valid: 3,562 Spoilt: 62 Quota: 713 Turnout: 3,624 (33.02%)

=== 2007 election ===
2007 Aberdeenshire Council election

Peterhead North and Rattray
Party	Candidate	FPv%	Count						
Party	Candidate	FPv%	1	2	3	4	5	6	7
SNP	Anne Allan	22.4	1,018						
Independent	Alan Buchan	20.9	948	948					
SNP	Fiona McRae	15.0	682	696	699	713	735	763	1,316
Conservative	Robert Thomas	14.4	655	655	659	667	704	803	819
SNP	Sandy Allan	12.9	585	666	671	685	718	752	
Liberal Democrats	Andrew Hassan	6.3	288	290	292	304	356		
Independent	Ian Cowie	5.6	256	257	265	289			
Solidarity	Steven Will	2.5	112	113	115				
Electorate: - Valid: 4,544 Spoilt: 150 Quota: 909 Turnout: 46.04%
