= Westhill and District (ward) =

Electoral ward of Aberdeenshire Council, Scotland

- Aberdeenshire Council
- Boundary of Westhill and District in Aberdeenshire from 2017.
- Electorate: 12,033

Current ward
- Created: 2007
- Councillor: Fatima Joji (SNP)
- Councillor: Iris Margaret Walker (Liberal Democrats)
- Councillor: Craig Miller (Conservative)
- Councillor: Ron McKail (Conservative)

Westhill and District is one of the nineteen wards used to elect members of the Aberdeenshire Council. It elects four Councillors.

== Councillors ==
Election	Councillors			
2007	Mark Cullen (Independent)	Gurudeo Singh Saluja (Liberal Democrats)	Amanda Allan (SNP)	Ron McKail (Conservative)
2012	David Robert Aitchison (SNP)	Iris Margaret Walker (Liberal Democrats)	Amanda Allan (SNP)	Ron McKail (Conservative)
2017	David Robert Aitchison (SNP)	Iris Margaret Walker (Liberal Democrats)	Alistair McKelvie (Conservative)	Ron McKail (Conservative)
2022	Fatima Joji (SNP)	Iris Margaret Walker (Liberal Democrats)	Craig Miller (Conservative)	Ron McKail (Conservative)

== Election results ==
=== 2022 election ===
Westhill and District − 4 seats
Party	Candidate	FPv%	Count			
Party	Candidate	FPv%	1	2	3	4
Conservative	Ron McKail (incumbent)	29.0	1,655			
Liberal Democrats	Iris Margaret Walker (incumbent)	26.3	1,498			
SNP	Fatima Joji	25.1	1,430			
Conservative	Craig Miller	10.6	605	1,050	1,135	1,144
Labour	Lesley Young	7.6	434	455	604	705
Alba	Colin MacKay	0.8	48	53	61	101
ISP	Stephen Cameron	0.6	36	38	47	105
Electorate: 12,033 Valid: 5,706 Spoilt: 58 Quota: 1,142 Turnout: 47.9%

=== 2017 Election ===
2017 Aberdeenshire Council election

Westhill and District - 4 seats
Party	Candidate	FPv%	Count						
Party	Candidate	FPv%	1	2	3	4	5	6	7
Conservative	Ron McKail (incumbent)	33.67	2,019						
Liberal Democrats	Iris Margaret Walker (incumbent)	22.85	1,370						
SNP	David Robert Aitchison (incumbent)	14.63	877	884.71	893.94	912.92	921.93	987.15	1,603.65
Conservative	Alistair McKelvie	13.81	828	1,564					
SNP	Heather Coull	9.29	557	561.06	567.94	584.07	593.09	689.29	
Labour	Lindsey Kirkhill	4.44	266	279.39	331.55	377.96	422.04		
Scottish Libertarian	Derek Scott	1.31	79	83.46	114.63	126.79			
Electorate: TBC Valid: 5,996 Spoilt: 65 Quota: 1,200 Turnout: 6,061 (50.4%)

=== 2012 Election ===
2012 Aberdeenshire Council election

Westhill and District - 4 seats
Party	Candidate	FPv%	Count				
Party	Candidate	FPv%	1	2	3	4	5
Conservative	Ron McKail (incumbent)	29.35%	1,163				
Liberal Democrats	Iris Margaret Walker	24.08%	954				
SNP	Amanda Allan (incumbent)	17.99%	713	780.1	813.0		
SNP	David Robert Aitchison	17.74%	703	735.5	749.8	766.6	974.2
Labour	Peter Young	10.83%	429	503.1	560.5	561.5	
Electorate: 10,882 Valid: 3,962 Spoilt: 32 Quota: 793 Turnout: 3,994 (36.41%)

=== 2007 Election ===
2007 Aberdeenshire Council election

Westhill and District
Party	Candidate	FPv%	Count					
Party	Candidate	FPv%	1	2	3	4	5	6
Liberal Democrats	Gurudeo Singh Saluja	27.3	1,558					
Conservative	Ron McKail	22.9	1,306					
SNP	Amanda Allan	21.6	1,230					
Independent	Mark Cullen††††††††	14.8	845	896	945	967	1,031	1,407
Liberal Democrats	Sheila Thomson	8.1	460	736	774	794	935	
Labour	Ona Ramsay	5.3	301	325	333	344		
Electorate: Valid: 5,700 Spoilt: 39 Quota: 1,141 Turnout: 55.00%
