= Yi-pei Chou Turvey =

Scottish Liberal Democrat politician

Yi-pei Chou Turvey MSP
- 周怡霈
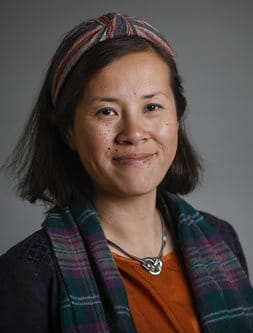
- Official portrait, 2026

Member of the Scottish Parliament for North East Scotland (1 of 7 Regional MSPs)
- Incumbent
- Assumed office 7 May 2026

Scottish Liberal Democrat portfolios
- 2026–present: Spokesperson for Justice

Personal details
- Born: Chou Yi-pei Taiwan
- Party: Scottish Liberal Democrats
- Website: www.scotlibdems.org.uk/about-us/our-candidates/yi-pei-chou-turvey

Yi-pei Chou Turvey (Chinese: 周怡霈; WG:Chou¹ Yi²-pei⁴ ;HP: Zhōu Yípèi; born 1981) is a Scottish Liberal Democrat politician who has served as a Member of the Scottish Parliament (MSP) for the North East Scotland region since 2026.

== Biography ==
Chou Turvey was born in Taiwan and raised in Brussels, where she met her now husband, Michael Turvey, in 2009. They later moved to Aberdeenshire and were married in 2012.. Like her husband, she originally supported the Scottish Conservatives before switching to the Lib Dems.

Chou Turvey is a member of Aberdeenshire Council, representing the Banchory and Mid-Deeside ward. She is a member of Chinese, East & South East Asian Liberal Democrats.

She was elected as a list MSP for North East Scotland in the 2026 Scottish Parliament election, also unsuccessfully standing in Aberdeen Central, placing fifth. She and her husband both stood as candidates. Chou Turvey notably took her oath of office in Mandarin, French, and English.
