= Banchory and Mid-Deeside (ward) =

- Aberdeenshire Council
- Boundary of Banchory and Mid-Deeside in Aberdeenshire from 2017.
- Electorate: 9,105

Current ward
- Created: 2007
- Councillor: Yi-pei Chou Turvey (Liberal Democrats)
- Councillor: Ann Ross (Conservative)
- Councillor: Eileen Durno (SNP)

Banchory and Mid-Deeside is one of the nineteen wards used to elect members of the Aberdeenshire Council. It elects three Councillors.

== Councillors ==
Election	Councillors		
2007	Karen Clark (Liberal Democrats)	Jill Webster (Conservative)	Linda Clark (SNP)
2012	Karen Clark (Liberal Democrats)	Jill Webster (Conservative)	Linda Clark (SNP)
2017	Rosemary Bruce (Liberal Democrats)	Ann Ross (Conservative)	Eileen Durno (SNP)
2022	Yi-pei Chou Turvey (Liberal Democrats)	Ann Ross (Conservative)	Eileen Durno (SNP)

== Election results ==
=== 2022 election ===
Banchory and Mid-Deeside − 3 seats
Party	Candidate	FPv%	Count			
Party	Candidate	FPv%	1	2	3	4
Conservative	Ann Ross (incumbent) (Note: In 2024, Cllr Ross quit the Conservatives to sit as an independent.)	25.1	1,211			
SNP	Eileen Durno (incumbent)	24.0	1,158	1,158	1,161	1,264
Liberal Democrats	Yi-pei Chou Turvey	21.5	1,040	1,040	1,049	1,340
Conservative	Harriet Cross	17.6	852	854	867	924
Labour	Andy Brown	11.1	536	536	542	
Scottish Family	Graeme Craib	0.7	35	35		
Electorate: 9,105 Valid: 4,832 Spoilt: 38 Quota: 1,209 Turnout: 53.5%

=== 2017 Election ===
2017 Aberdeenshire Council election

Banchory and Mid-Deeside - 3 seats
Party	Candidate	FPv%	Count			
Party	Candidate	FPv%	1	2	3	4
Conservative	Ann Ross	52.8	2,525			
SNP	Eileen Durno	21.89	1,046	1,088.11	1,162.35	1,417.64
Liberal Democrats	Rosemary Bruce	20.25	968	1,689.6		
Labour	Iain Gillies	5.04	241	352.58	596.12	
Electorate: TBC Valid: 4,780 Spoilt: 33 Quota: 1,196 Turnout: 4,813 (54.6%)

=== 2012 Election ===
2012 Aberdeenshire Council election

Banchory and Mid-Deeside - 3 seats
Party	Candidate	FPv%	Count	
Party	Candidate	FPv%	1	2
Conservative	Jill Webster (incumbent)	36.0	1,185	
SNP	Linda Clark (incumbent)	29.1	956	
Liberal Democrats	Karen Clark (incumbent)	23.0	757	952.8
Labour	Lesley Young	8.4	278	
Green	Matt Wickham	3.5	114	
Electorate: 8,296 Valid: 3,290 Spoilt: 19 Quota: 823 Turnout: 3,309 (39.66%)

=== 2007 Election ===
2007 Aberdeenshire Council election

Banchory and Mid-Deeside
Party	Candidate	FPv%	Count				
Party	Candidate	FPv%	1	2	3	4	5
Conservative	Jill Webster	35.6	1,570				
SNP	Linda Clark	24.2	1,068	1,140			
Liberal Democrats	Karen Clark	18.0	795	876	885	1,029	1,691
Liberal Democrats	Jean Henretty	15.3	676	790	798	857	
Labour	Andy Brown	6.8	300	326	331		
Electorate: Valid: 4,409 Spoilt: 46 Quota: 1,103 Turnout: 56.32%
