= West Garioch (ward) =

Electoral ward of the Aberdeenshire Council in Scotland

- Aberdeenshire Council
- Boundary of West Garioch in Aberdeenshire from 2017.
- Electorate: 9,227

Current ward
- Created: 2007
- Councillor: Moray Grant (SNP)
- Councillor: Hazel Smith (Liberal Democrats)
- Councillor: Sam Payne (Conservative)

West Garioch is one of the nineteen wards used to elect members of the Aberdeenshire Council. It elects three Councillors.

== Councillors ==
Election	Councillors		
2007	Alison Grant (SNP)	Sheena Margaret Lonchay (Liberal Democrats)	Hazel Al-Kowarri (Liberal Democrats)
2012	Alison Grant (SNP)	Sheena Margaret Lonchay (Liberal Democrats)	Patricia Odie (Conservative)
2017	Victoria Harper (SNP)	Hazel Smith (Liberal Democrats)	Sebastian Leslie (Conservative/ Independent)
2022	Moray Grant (SNP)	Hazel Smith (Liberal Democrats)	Sam Payne (Conservative)

== Election results ==
=== 2022 election ===
West Garioch − 3 seats
Party	Candidate	FPv%	Count							
Party	Candidate	FPv%	1	2	3	4	5	6	7	8
SNP	Moray Grant	29.4	1,247							
Conservative	Sam Payne	27.1	1,150							
Liberal Democrats	Hazel Smith (incumbent)	12.7	539	561	588	598	683	736	956	1,318
Independent	Sheena Lonchay	10.6	451	468	480	493	536	696	773	
Labour	Sasha Brydon	7.6	324	348	357	365	425	451		
Independent	Sebastian Leslie (incumbent) (Note: In 2018, West Garioch Conservative councillor Sebastian Leslie was suspended from the party over council tax arrears.)	6.4	273	282	299	306	326			
Green	Anne Mansfield	4.3	182	251	253	279				
Alba	Elaine Mitchell	1.7	71	88	89					
Electorate: 9,227 Valid: 4,237 Spoilt: 44 Quota: 1,060 Turnout: 46.4%

=== 2017 Election ===
2017 Aberdeenshire Council election

West Garioch - 3 seats
Party	Candidate	FPv%	Count					
Party	Candidate	FPv%	1	2	3	4	5	6
Conservative	Sebastian Leslie††	42.49	1,809					
SNP	Victoria Harper	19.73	840	858.10	874.33	879.02	979.03	1,487.26
Liberal Democrats	Hazel Smith	15.64	666	1,011.06	1,155.76			
SNP	Elaine Mitchell	10.31	439	450.52	460.75	465.65	577.54	
Green	Richard Paul Openshaw	7.19	306	353.71	401.52	436.47		
Labour	Peter Young	4.63	197	266.5				
Electorate: TBC Valid: 4,257 Spoilt: 53 Quota: 1,065 Turnout: 4,310 (47.6%)

=== 2012 Election ===
2012 Aberdeenshire Council election

West Garioch - 3 seats
Party	Candidate	FPv%	Count			
Party	Candidate	FPv%	1	2	3	4
SNP	Allison Grant (incumbent)	42.5	1,327			
Conservative	Patricia Oddie	20.8	651	716.3	774.3	826.9
Liberal Democrats	Sheena Margaret Lonchay (incumbent) ††	14.0	439	555.6	645.3	1,052.7
Liberal Democrats	Hazel Linda Al-Kowarri (incumbent)	13.6	426	495.4	601.1	
Green	Richard Paul Openshaw	9.1	283	407.0		
Electorate: 8,621 Valid: 3,126 Spoilt: 27 Quota: 782 Turnout: 3,153 (36.26%)

=== 2007 Election ===
2007 Aberdeenshire Council election

West Garioch
Party	Candidate	FPv%	Count					
Party	Candidate	FPv%	1	2	3	4	5	6
SNP	Alison Grant	35.5	1,555					
Liberal Democrats	Sheena Margaret Lonchay	22.2	973	1,063	1,085	1,169		
Liberal Democrats	Hazel Al-Kowarri	18.4	807	884	899	981	1,027	1,358
Conservative	David Clucas	15.8	694	746	775	821	830	
Labour	Ricky Simpson	6.0	263	293	303			
Independent	Terry Rigby	2.1	93	125				
Electorate: - Valid: 4,385 Spoilt: 58 Quota: 1,097 Turnout: 55.68%
