= Bervie Braes =

Road in Stonehaven, Scotland

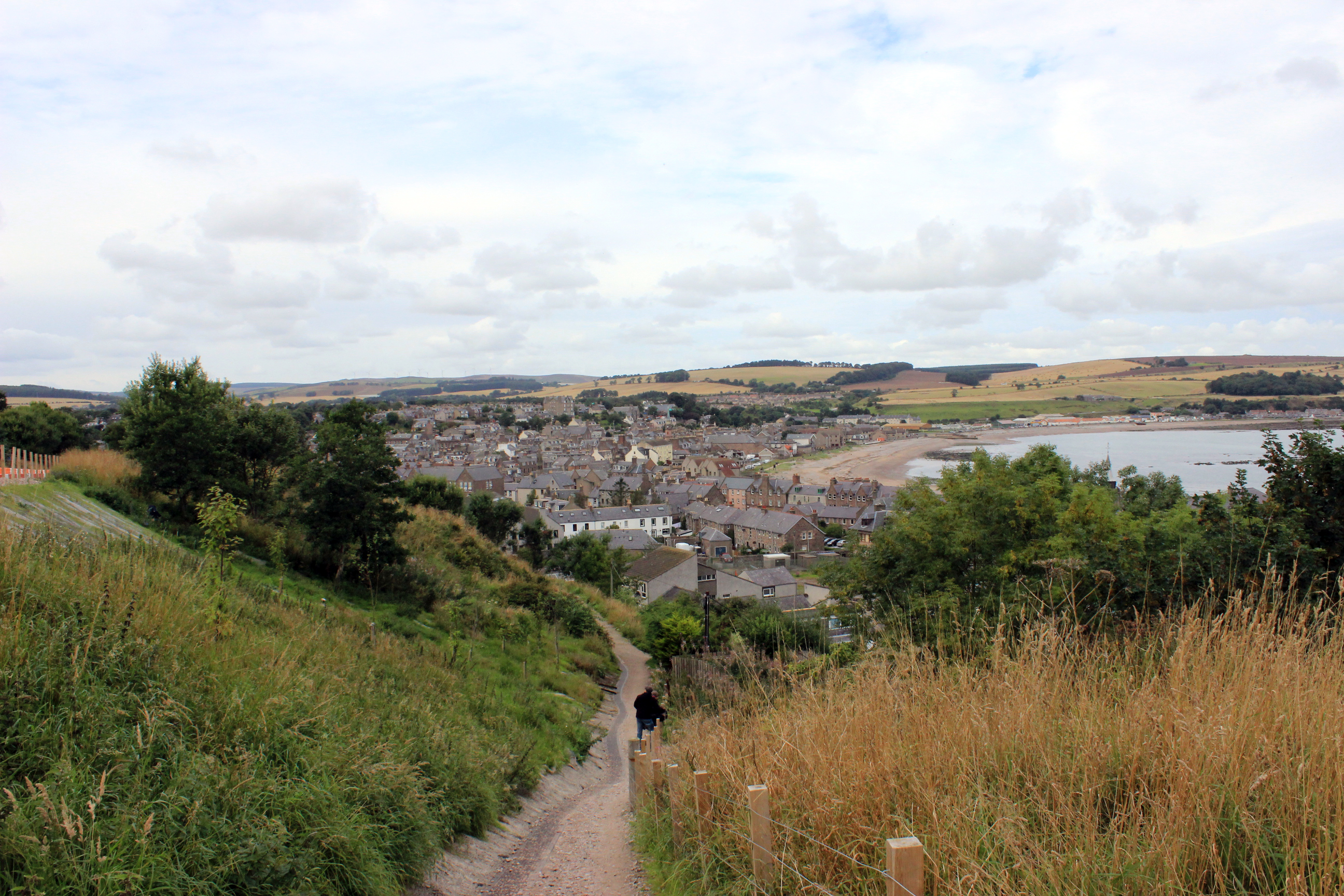
A view of Stonehaven from a path along the Bervie Braes

Bervie Braes is a road and associated hillside in Stonehaven, Scotland. Following multiple landslides, the road is currently only open to pedestrians and cyclists.

== History ==
In 2009, Aberdeenshire Council asked the Scottish Government for £5.7 million to carry out work to stabilise the cliffs. The request was turned down. At the time, the council carried out daily inspections due to fears the cliff would collapse.

In February 2010, a series of landslides led to the evacuation of 65 homes, with at least one home severely damaged. The following month, an agreement was reached between Aberdeenshire Council and the Scottish Government to fund stabilisation work, with £2 million provided by the government and £1 million provided by the council.

In March 2012, a £2.4 million contract for the work was awarded to Forkers. The work was carried out from April to September 2012.

The road was reopened in 2013 following £300,000 of work. A 20 mph speed limit and a three-tonne weight limit were introduced, and the road was only opened during summer months.

In 2014, the council decided to continue to open the road during summer months only, following a study which suggested that a full reopening would boost the Stonehaven economy by between £30,000 and £600,000 annually. This followed a study commissioned by the Stonehaven Town Partnership which claimed reopening the road would have an annual economic benefit of £9.3 million.

A small landslide occurred in October 2021. In April 2022, the council announced that additional barriers would be installed to catch falling debris. It stated that the instability of the cliff was "far more extensive" than previously thought and that as a result the road would not reopen for vehicles.
