= North Kincardine =

- Aberdeenshire Council
- Boundary of North Kincardine in Aberdeenshire from 2017.
- Electorate: 12,478

Current ward
- Created: 2007
- Councillor: Mel Sullivan (Liberal Democrats)
- Councillor: David Aitchison (SNP)
- Councillor: Shirley Burnett (Conservative)
- Councillor: Catherine Victor (SNP)

North Kincardine is one of the nineteen wards used to elect members of the Aberdeenshire Council. It elects four Councillors.

== Councillors ==
Election	Councillors			
2007	Ian Mollison (Liberal Democrats)	Paul Melling (Liberal Democrats)	Carl H Nelson (Conservative)	Alastair Bews (SNP/Alba)
2012	Ian Mollison (Liberal Democrats)	Alison Evison (Labour)	Carl H Nelson (Conservative)	Alastair Bews (SNP/Alba)
2017	Ian Mollison (Liberal Democrats)	Alison Evison (Labour)	Colin Pike (Conservative/ Independent)	Alastair Bews (SNP/Alba)
2021	Ian Mollison (Liberal Democrats)	Alison Evison (Labour)	Colin Pike (Conservative/ Independent)	Alastair Bews (SNP/Alba)
2022	Mel Sullivan (Liberal Democrats)	David Aitchison (SNP)	Shirley Burnett (Conservative)	Catherine Victor (SNP)

== Election results ==
=== 2022 election ===
North Kincardine − 4 seats
Party	Candidate	FPv%	Count								
Party	Candidate	FPv%	1	2	3	4	5	6	7	8	9
SNP	David Aitchison (Note: Sitting councillor for West Hill and District.)	21.6	1,182								
Conservative	Shirley Burnett	15.6	855	856	863	898	906	1,457			
Liberal Democrats	Mel Sullivan	15.5	850	852	864	896	993	1,016	1,126		
SNP	Catherine Mary Victor (Note: In 2024, Cllr Victor was suspended by the SNP.)	14.6	799	865	870	903	1,052	1,053	1,059	1,064	1,214
Conservative	Jeff Hutchison (Note: Sitting councillor for Mearns.)	11.3	620	621	626	633	637				
Independent	Colin Pike (incumbent)	9.6	527	528	534	649	684	718	804	815	
Green	Louise Claire Ross	5.7	314	319	335	348					
Independent	Alastair Bews (incumbent)	4.7	255	259	269						
Scottish Family	Elizabeth Wilson Leslie	1.4	75	76							
Electorate: 12,478 Valid: 5,477 Spoilt: 80 Quota: 1,096 Turnout: 44.5%

=== 2017 Election ===
2017 Aberdeenshire Council election

North Kincardine - 4 seats
Party	Candidate	FPv%	Count		
Party	Candidate	FPv%	1	2	3
Conservative	Colin Pike	30.46	1,685		
Liberal Democrats	Ian Mollison (incumbent)	22.08	1,221		
SNP	Alastair Bews (incumbent)	20.55	1,138		
Labour	Alison Evison (incumbent)	16.27	901	1,074.91	1,124.67
SNP	Kes Smith	6.47	358	375.49	387.16
Green	William Ball	3.25	180	224.25	237.88
SDP	David Lansdell	0.87	48	95.34	100.66
Electorate: TBC Valid: 5,531 Spoilt: 48 Quota: 1,107 Turnout: 5,579 (45.2%)

=== 2012 Election ===
2012 Aberdeenshire Council election

North Kincardine - 4 seats
Party	Candidate	FPv%	Count					
Party	Candidate	FPv%	1	2	3	4	5	6
SNP	Alastair Bews (incumbent)	24.94%	988					
Labour	Alison Evison	21.53%	853					
Conservative	Carl Nelson (incumbent)	19.74%	782	785.7	790.3	812.7		
Liberal Democrats	Ian Mollison (incumbent)	11.71%	464	466.8	472.8	478.1	484.7	833.2
Liberal Democrats	Paul Melling (incumbent)	10.48%	415	423.1	434.9	437.4	441.7	
SNP	Alan Inglis	10.43%	413	585.3	598.4	607.4	609.1	644.7
Scottish Christian	Tom Morrow	1.16%	46	46.8	49.6			
Electorate: 10,563 Valid: 3,961 Spoilt: 36 Quota: 793 Turnout: 3,997 (37.50%)

=== 2007 Election ===
2007 Aberdeenshire Council election

North Kincardine
Party	Candidate	FPv%	Count						
Party	Candidate	FPv%	1	2	3	4	5	6	7
SNP	Alastair Bews	27.8	1,426						
Conservative	Carl H Nelson	18.4	946	972	1,008	1,065			
Liberal Democrats	Paul Melling	16.8	864	957	978	1,124			
Liberal Democrats	Ian Mollison	12.1	619	652	689	799	863	875	1,119
Independent	Henry Irvine-Fortescue	11.2	575	613	659	707	713	723	
Labour	Jim Milne	10.5	540	586	596				
Independent	Michelle Reid-Hay	3.2	162	194					
Electorate: Valid: 5,132 Spoilt: 37 Quota: 1,027 Turnout: 52.36%
