= Joanna Strathdee =

Scottish politician

Member of Aberdeenshire Council
- In office 1999–2015
- Constituency: Huntly, Strathbogie and Howe of Alford

Personal details
- Born: 27 December 1954
- Died: 23 August 2015 (aged 60)
- Party: Scottish National Party

Joanna Strathdee (27 December 1954 – 23 August 2015) was a Scottish National Party politician and a councillor on Aberdeenshire Council for the Huntly, Strathbogie and Howe of Alford ward. From 2007 to 2012, she served as the SNP Group Leader.

== Early life ==
Strathdee was born in Keith, Scotland, and attended Rothiemay Primary School followed by Keith Grammar School.

== Political career ==
In 1999, she was elected to Aberdeenshire Council. She contested the 2005 United Kingdom general election in Gordon unsuccessfully finishing fourth with 7,098 votes. In the 2007 Scottish local elections she topped the poll in her ward with 1,839 first preferences and was elected on the first count and thereafter became SNP Group Leader. She later contested the 2010 United Kingdom general election in Aberdeen North unsuccessfully, finishing second with 8,385 votes to the Labour Party's Frank Doran. She was a selected as an SNP candidate for Aberdeen Central in the 2011 Scottish Parliament elections but stood down due to illness.

Strathdee retained her seat in the 2012 Scottish local elections, taking the second seat and exceeding the quota with 830 first preferences. However, she was unable to bring in a running mate with her. Following the election on 8 May 2012 her party colleague, Cllr Rob Merson, was elected as Leader of the enlarged SNP group in place of Strathdee. However, within an hour of this happening Merson resigned and Strathdee was reinstated. In July 2012, Hamish Vernal replaced her as leader of the SNP group as they formed a shadow Aberdeenshire council administration.

== Death ==
Strathdee died on 23 August 2015 having been diagnosed five years previously with primary peritoneal cancer, a type of ovarian cancer.

== Sources ==
- Joanna Strathdee: electoral history, ukpollingreport.co.uk; retrieved 26 August 2015.
