= Aboyne, Upper Deeside and Donside (ward) =

Electoral ward in Scotland

- Aberdeenshire Council
- Boundary of Aboyne, Upper Deeside and Donside in Aberdeenshire from 2017.
- Electorate: 9,066

Current ward
- Created: 2007
- Councillor: Anouk Kloppert (SNP)
- Councillor: Sarah Brown (Conservative)
- Councillor: Geva Blackett (Independent)

Aboyne, Upper Deeside and Donside is one of the nineteen wards used to elect members of the Aberdeenshire Council. It elects three Councillors.

== Councillors ==
Election	Councillors		
2007	Peter Argyle (Liberal Democrats)	Marcus Humphrey (Conservative)	Bruce Luffman (Conservative)
2009	Peter Argyle (Liberal Democrats)	Marcus Humphrey (Conservative)	Rosemary Bruce (Liberal Democrats)
2012	Peter Argyle (Liberal Democrats)	Katrina Farquhar (Conservative)	Geva Blackett (SNP/ Ind.)
2017	Peter Argyle (Liberal Democrats)	Paul Gibb (Conservative)	Geva Blackett (SNP/ Ind.)
2022	Anouk Kloppert (SNP)	Sarah Brown (Conservative)	Geva Blackett (SNP/ Ind.)

== Election results ==
=== 2022 election ===
Aboyne, Upper Deeside and Donside − 3 seats
Party	Candidate	FPv%	Count					
Party	Candidate	FPv%	1	2	3	4	5	6
Independent	Geva Blackett (incumbent)	22.7	1,098	1,127	1,173	1,272		
SNP	Anouk Kloppert (Note: Sitting councillor for Ellon and District.)	21.7	1,049	1,091	1,098	1,104	1,118	1,459
Conservative	Sarah Brown	21.3	1,029	1,040	1,571			
Liberal Democrats	Peter Argyle (incumbent)	17.5	846	908	950	1,064	1,091	
Conservative	Claudia Leith	13.2	640	653				
Labour	John Lawson	3.7	179					
Electorate: 9,066 Valid: 4,841 Spoilt: 40 Quota: 1,211 Turnout: 53.8%

=== 2017 Election ===
2017 Aberdeenshire Council election

Aboyne, Upper Deeside and Donside - 3 seats
Party	Candidate	FPv%	Count	
Party	Candidate	FPv%	1	2
Conservative	Paul Gibb	43.97	2,093	
SNP	Geva Blackett (incumbent)	29.66	1,364	
Liberal Democrats	Peter Argyle (incumbent)	18.91	900	1,307.70
Independent	Anne Reid	4.74	226	338.17
Labour	Claire Miller	3.7	176	238.99
Electorate: TBC Valid: 4,759 Spoilt: 32 Quota: 1,190 Turnout: 4,791 (53.2%)

=== 2012 Election ===
2012 Aberdeenshire Council election

Aboyne, Upper Deeside and Donside - 3 seats
Party	Candidate	FPv%	Count				
Party	Candidate	FPv%	1	2	3	4	5
Conservative	Katrina Farquhar	34.62%	1,332				
SNP	Geva Blackett	28.36%	1,091				
Liberal Democrats	Peter Argyle (incumbent)	16.64%	640	756.9	780.7	852.7	1,443.3
Liberal Democrats	Rosemary Bruce (incumbent)	14.11%	543	629.1	649.8	734.7	
Labour	Beverly Cochran	5.48%	241	267.1	294.4		
Electorate: 8,597 Valid: 3,847 Spoilt: 39 Quota: 962 Turnout: 3,876 (44.75%)

=== 2009 By-election ===
There was an Aboyne, Upper Deeside and Donside by-election held on 23 April 2009 to fill the vacancy which arose with the resignation of the Conservative's Bruce Luffman in 2009. The by-election was won by the Liberal Democrat's Rosemary Bruce on 23 April 2009

Aboyne, Upper Deeside and Donside by-election, 23 April 2009
Party	Candidate	FPv%	Count				
Party	Candidate	FPv%	1	2	3	4	5
Conservative	Jo Pick	31.47	1,144	1,148	1,152	1,241	1,468
Liberal Democrats	Rosemary Bruce	26.66	969	975	981	1,180	1,566
Independent	William Forbes	23.16	842	845	855	1,003	
SNP	George Parkinson	16.97	617	621	636		
BNP	Roy Jones	1.21	44	44			
Independent	David Hutchison	0.52	19				
Liberal Democrats gain from Conservative		Swing					
Electorate: 8,357 Valid: 3,635 Spoilt: 20 Quota: 1,819 Turnout: 3,655 (43.7%)

=== 2007 Election ===
2007 Aberdeenshire Council election

Aboyne, Upper Deeside and Donside
Party	Candidate	FPv%	Count				
Party	Candidate	FPv%	1	2	3	4	5
Conservative	Marcus Humphrey	29.3	1,444				
Liberal Democrats	Peter Argyle	26.1	1,286				
Conservative	Bruce Luffman	20.5	1,009	1,160	1,172	1,218	1,625
SNP	Carol Douglas	20.1	991	1,009	1,021	1,078	
Labour	Angus Murdoch	4.0	196	202	213		
Electorate: Valid: 4,926 Spoilt: 75 Quota: 1,232 Turnout: 59.51%
