= Stonehaven and Lower Deeside (ward) =

- Aberdeenshire Council
- Boundary of Stonehaven and Lower Deeside in Aberdeenshire from 2017.
- Electorate: 11,356

Current ward
- Created: 2007
- Councillor: Alan Turner (Conservative)
- Councillor: Sarah Dickinson (Liberal Democrats)
- Councillor: Wendy Agnew (Conservative)
- Councillor: Dawn Black (SNP)

Stonehaven and Lower Deeside is one of the nineteen wards used to elect members of the Aberdeenshire Council. It elects four Councillors.

== Councillors ==
Election	Councillors			
2007	Mike Sullivan (Liberal Democrats)	Peter Bellarby (Liberal Democrats)	Wendy Agnew (Conservative)	Graeme Clark (SNP)
2012	Raymond Christie (Labour)	Peter Bellarby (Liberal Democrats)	Wendy Agnew (Conservative)	Graeme Clark (SNP)
2017	Sandy Wallace (Conservative /Independent /Libertarian Party)	Sarah Dickinson (Liberal Democrats)	Wendy Agnew (Conservative)	Dennis Robertson (SNP)
2022	Alan Turner (Conservative)	Sarah Dickinson (Liberal Democrats)	Wendy Agnew (Conservative)	Dawn Black (SNP)

== Election results ==
=== 2022 election ===
Stonehaven and Lower Deeside − 4 seats
Party	Candidate	FPv%	Count							
Party	Candidate	FPv%	1	2	3	4	5	6	7	8
Liberal Democrats	Sarah Dickinson (incumbent)	22.7	1,263							
Conservative	Wendy Agnew (incumbent)	20.6	1,147							
SNP	Dawn Black	17.1	951	968	969	1,024	1,104	1,215		
Conservative	Alan Turner	11.3	630	652	677	681	721	852	854	1,018
SNP	Dennis Robertson (incumbent)	9.9	550	564	564	601	644	721	808	
Independent	Ma Simpson	8.3	462	489	491	518	631			
Labour	Raymond James Christie	6.9	383	412	415	453				
Green	Rachel Katherine Shanks	3.1	173	192	192					
Electorate: 11,356 Valid: 5,559 Spoilt: 86 Quota: 1,112 Turnout: 49.7%

=== 2017 Election ===
2017 Aberdeenshire Council election

Stonehaven and Lower Deeside - 4 seats
Party	Candidate	FPv%	Count				
Party	Candidate	FPv%	1	2	3	4	5
Conservative	Wendy Agnew (incumbent)	30.83	1,703				
SNP	Dennis Robertson	23.54	1,300				
Liberal Democrats	Sarah Dickinson	17.09	944	1,030.38	1,057.08	1,084.63	1,155.68
Conservative	Sandy Wallace†††	14.85	820	1,196.42			
Labour	Raymond Christie (incumbent)	6.36	351	381.9	403.05	410.4	457.09
Green	Rachel Shanks	3.84	212	223.24	312.79	316.27	365.31
Independent	Philip Bishop	3.49	193	217.23	229.83	243.06	
Electorate: TBC Valid: 5,523 Spoilt: 87 Quota: 1,105 Turnout: 5,610 (49.7%)

=== 2012 Election ===
2012 Aberdeenshire Council election

Stonehaven and Lower Deeside - 4 seats
Party	Candidate	FPv%	Count								
Party	Candidate	FPv%	1	2	3	4	5	6	7	8	9
Conservative	Wendy Agnew (incumbent)	27.0	1,111								
SNP	Graeme Clark (incumbent)	16.2	667	684.2	713.0	741.3	762.3	1052.7			
Labour	Raymond Christie	9.8	404	414.8	427.8	463.4	486.6	501.9	530.6	590.8	617.8
Liberal Democrats	Peter Bellarby (incumbent)	8.6	354	380.3	398.8	433.8	617.7	633.9	660.9	735.0	860.6
SNP	Robert Fergusson	7.5	311	314.9	335.4	353.1	371.7				
Conservative	Jeff Hutchison	6.7	278	404.9	426.5	438.0	458.9	462.9	474.3	526.8	
Liberal Democrats	David Fleming	6.7	275	297.9	319.5	347.5					
Green	Rachel Shanks	6.2	255	263.5	286.8						
Independent	Bob Michie	5.8	241	258.2	321.1	378.2	411.1	425.0	462.8		
Independent	Douglas Samways	5.4	224	243							
Electorate: 10,701 Valid: 4,120 Spoilt: 47 Quota: 825 Turnout: 4,167 (38.50%)

=== 2007 Election ===
2007 Aberdeenshire Council election

Stonehaven and Lower Deeside
Party	Candidate	FPv%	Count										
Party	Candidate	FPv%	1	2	3	4	5	6	7	8	9	10	11
Conservative	Wendy Agnew	24.9	1,433										
SNP	Graeme Clark	18.9	1,086	1,107	1,112	1,117	1,126	1,154					
Liberal Democrats	Mike Sullivan	11.0	636	656	657	668	684	700	701	741	797	931	1,105
Conservative	Sandy Wallace	10.9	629	730	735	737	751	760	760	779	823	853	
Liberal Democrats	Peter Bellarby	9.8	563	590	596	605	620	633	633	723	780	880	980
Labour	Bridget O'Hare	8.0	463	470	473	479	482	493	493	524	558		
Independent	Bob Michie	4.9	282	299	314	333	366	430	430	470			
Green	Karen Anne Allan	4.2	242	253	258	264	272	285	286				
Independent	George Alexander Forbes Emslie	2.8	160	177	182	189	201						
Independent	Ken Venters	1.9	108	116	132	139							
Independent	Dermot John Hearty	1.5	85	87	89								
Independent	David Wood	1.3	73	79									
Electorate: Valid: 5,760 Spoilt: 90 Quota: 1,153 Turnout: 54.79%
