= Woodhill House =

Council Offices in Aberdeen, Scotland

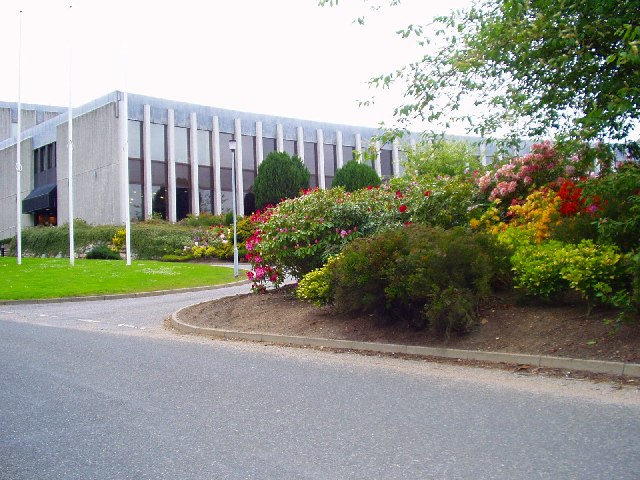
- Woodhill House

- Location within Aberdeen City council area

General information
- Architectural style: Brutalist style
- Location: Westburn Road, Aberdeen, United Kingdom
- Coordinates: 57.1532°N 2.1476°W
- Completed: 1977

Woodhill House is a large office development on Westburn Road in Aberdeen, Scotland. It was built as the headquarters of Grampian Regional Council in 1977 and then became the offices and meeting place of Aberdeenshire Council in 1996.

== History ==
The area was previously occupied by a county mansion, also known as Woodhill House, which dated from the 18th century and became the home of an advocate, Alexander Jopp, in the 19th century. Aberdeenshire County Council acquired the old house and its estate as a potential site for new offices in 1967.

The current building was commissioned by Grampian Regional Council, which was established in 1975, to be its headquarters. It was designed in the Brutalist style, built in concrete and glass and was officially opened by Queen Elizabeth II in May 1977. The design involved two four-storey wings, one to the north of the other, with the north wing projected slightly to the west of the south wing. To the east of the main structure was a two-storey curved block.

Following the implementation of the Local Government etc. (Scotland) Act 1994, Grampian Regional Council was abolished in 1996 and ownership of the building was transferred to the new unitary authority, Aberdeenshire Council, which designated the building its main office. Part of the building was subsequently let to Hewlett-Packard and to the Grampian Valuation Joint Board.

Artifacts in the building include a Pictish stone known as the "Rhynie Man" which depicts a bearded man carrying an axe; it was discovered near the village of Rhynie in 1978.
