= Scottish Libertarian Party =

Political party in Scotland

Scottish Libertarian Party Libeirtéiraich Albannach
- Leader: Tam Laird
- Chairperson: Alan Findlay
- Deputy Leader: Calum "Caz" Paul
- Founded: 3 January 2012; 14 years ago
- Headquarters: 111 George Street; Edinburgh; EH2 4JN
- Ideology: Libertarianism; Economic liberalism; Cultural liberalism; Scottish independence; Euroscepticism
- International affiliation: International Alliance of Libertarian Parties
- Colours: Buff and blue
- Scottish seats in the House of Commons: 0 / 59
- Scottish Parliament: 0 / 129
- Local government in Scotland: 0 / 1,227

Website
- www.scottishlibertarians.com

The Scottish Libertarian Party, also known as the Scottish Libertarians, is a political party in Scotland that advocates libertarianism. Its current leader is Tam Laird.

== History ==
The party was first founded on 3 January 2012 under the leadership of author Daniel Logan-Scott. It was refused registration by the Electoral Commission due to naming similarities with the Libertarian Party UK. This was resolved when the Libertarian Party UK altered its registration to no longer stand candidates or run in elections in Scotland. Despite organising various events, the Scottish Libertarian Party became inactive and stopped updating their blog.

After 3 years of inactivity, the Scottish Libertarian Party launched again in December 2015 under new leader Alan Findlay, officially registering with the Electoral Commission in March 2016.

In the 2016 Scottish Parliament election the party stood in the West Scotland, Mid Scotland and Fife, North East Scotland regions and the Edinburgh Central constituency. The party received its highest percentage of votes in Edinburgh Central with 0.3%, or 119 votes, and received 650 votes in Mid Scotland and Fife, 552 in North East Scotland and 480 in West Scotland, for a total of 1,805 votes in Scotland.

In the 2019 general election the party fielded one candidate in the constituency Kilmarnock and Loudoun, Stef Johnstone, then deputy leader, getting 405 votes (0.9% of the votes cast). However, they said that the reason they were only standing one candidate was because this election was solely about Brexit, and that it would be better to save their money for the 2021 Scottish Parliament election, when they hope to stand candidates in all regions and a few key constituencies. They did, however, advise people to vote for whatever party was the most likely to deliver a no-deal Brexit.

On 10 November 2020, the Scottish Libertarian Party announced that Aberdeenshire councillor for Stonehaven and Lower Deeside, Sandy Wallace had joined the party. Cllr Wallace was originally elected as a Conservative at the 2017 Aberdeenshire Council election, but became an independent on 12 December 2018, citing he had no faith in either the Prime Minister or the Conservative-controlled Coalition in Aberdeenshire. He became the party's first elected representative at any level of governance in Scotland.

In the 2021 Scottish Parliament election for the first time the party fielded candidates in all eight regions and nine constituencies, getting 4,987 votes in the regions (0.2% of the total votes) and 1,913 votes in the constituencies (0.1% of the total votes).

January 2022 saw an internal dispute between the party leader Tam Laird and the party's former nomination officer and largest financial contributor Stephen McNamara come to public attention when McNamara publicly announced a leadership challenge. This caused a large conflict between differing party factions within the membership resulting in the party's committee removing McNamara from the membership.

In 2022 Stef Johnstone resigned as deputy leader of the party, citing the removal of a member, believed to be Stephen McNamara, from the party as one of the contributing factors. The new deputy leader is Calum "Caz" Paul.

The party was statutorily deregistered by the Electoral Commission in November 2022, but re-registered in January 2023.

== Policies ==
=== Economic policy ===
The Scottish Libertarian Party advocates for a free market, opposing the welfare state and would see all sectors of the economy run privately, including education and healthcare. They are against the idea of state ownership, saying, "Every person has a right to their justly earned or created property to use, sell, rent, lend, or dispose of as they choose... What is commonly seen as property ownership in the United Kingdom is in fact property use. The actual owner remains the government." They also advocate for the abolition of all taxes with the exception of income tax. They say that they recognise that income tax is the primary means of funding the government, and that until a better alternative is found, it would be reduced to a smaller, flat tax. They also want to abolish corporate welfare, including subsidies and special privileges for big businesses.

The party is against all tariffs and supports unilateral free trade with all other countries.

On inflation, the party says, "...the Scottish Libertarians advocate a monetary system based on gold, silver, or both and denounce the fiat money system and the central banking system that creates inflation."

=== Social policy ===
The Scottish Libertarians believe that "there are no groups" when it comes to issues such as gender equality and sexual orientation, instead stating "There are only people and people come individually."

On crime and justice, they say that the rights of the person accused must never be undermined, such as the rights of due process, a speedy trial, legal counsel, trial by jury, and the legal presumption of innocence until proven guilty. In their 2016 Scottish Parliament manifesto, they stated that individuals have the right to live how they want to live, as long as they don't harm others. They also said that they would prefer a more restorative justice system.

The party is for the legalisation of all drugs and would end what they call the costly and ineffective War on drugs. They also support the decriminalisation of prostitution in line with the New Zealand Model, as advocated by Amnesty International.

The party is pro-free speech, and oppose restrictions of what the SNP describes as "hate speech". The party's leader, Tam Laird, wrote once that he lived in Zambia as a boy. He said that he enjoyed it, but criticising the president, the army and UNIP (the party the President Kenneth Kaunda was leader of) were crimes. He complained that, in time, the situation would be the same in Scotland, comparing it to the boiling frog theory.

=== Foreign policy ===
The party supports Scottish independence, because they say that their policies are impossible to enact under the current political situation. However, unlike most other pro-independence Scottish parties, they are against the EU, as they claim that re-joining it after independence would "simply be trading one foreign master for another." They are willing to work with the EU for reduction of barriers to trade and movement of people between Scotland and the EU. They are against all tariffs and wish for the country to adopt unilateral free trade. They have voiced support for Liberland.

On immigration, the party takes a very liberal stance, and support easy immigration to Scotland. However, they support "reasonable controls... to prevent the entry of foreign nationals who pose a credible threat to security, health, or property."

When it comes to international conflicts and warfare, the party argues for diplomacy as the primary option for resolution and rejects the use of force, either militant or economic, as a means of achieving the international goals. Should diplomacy fail and the life, liberty, or property of the nation was at stake, then war becomes the only option remaining and will be officially declared through the passage of legislation.

=== Education and healthcare ===
The party believes that education is best facilitated by the free market and that schools should be managed locally, arguing it would help achieve greater accountability and parental involvement.

They consider the current healthcare system to be poorly performing and would heavily reform it, believing that a free market solution would better suit this task. They also would legislate to allow for assisted suicide or 'dignified death'.

== Electoral performance ==
=== Scottish Parliament elections ===
Year	Regional vote			Constituency vote			Overall seats	Change	Government
2016	1,686 votes	0.1%	0 / 56	119 votes	0.0%	0 / 73	0 / 129	New party	Extra-parliamentary
2021	4,988 votes	0.2%	0 / 56	1,913 votes	0.1%	0 / 73	0 / 129	Steady	Extra-parliamentary
2026	1,909 votes	0.08%	0 / 56	56 votes	0.00%	0 / 73	0 / 129	Steady	Extra-parliamentary

=== Scottish local elections ===
Year	First-preference votes		Councils
2017	776	0.0%	0
2022	698	0.0%	0
