= Aberdeenshire Council =

Unitary authority council in Aberdeenshire, Scotland

Aberdeenshire Council Comhairle Siorrachd Obar Dheathain
- Council logo

Leadership
- Provost: Judy Whyte, Independent since 19 May 2022
- Co-leaders: Stewart Adams; Conservative and Anne Stirling; Liberal Democrat since 26 June 2025
- Chief Executive: Jim Savege since February 2015

Structure
- Seats: 70 councillors
- Graph of the party split among 70 seats.
- Political groups: Administration (40) Conservative (20) Liberal Democrats (14) Independent (6) Other parties (30) SNP (19) Reform (7) Independent (4)

Elections
- Voting system: Single transferable vote
- Last election: 5 May 2022
- Next election: 6 May 2027

Meeting place
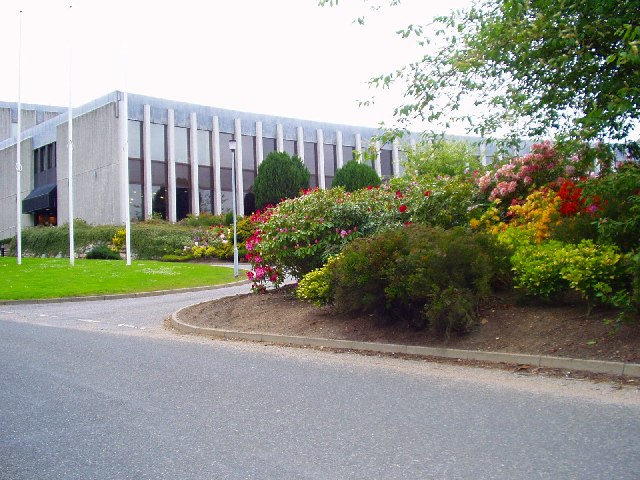
- Woodhill House, Westburn Road, Aberdeen, AB16 5GB

Website
- www.aberdeenshire.gov.uk

Aberdeenshire Council (Scottish Gaelic: Comhairle Siorrachd Obar Dheathain) is the local authority for Aberdeenshire, one of the 32 council areas of Scotland. The council has been under no overall control since its creation in 1996. It is based at Woodhill House, which is outside its own territory in the neighbouring Aberdeen City council area.

== History ==
The Aberdeenshire council area was created in 1996 under the Local Government etc. (Scotland) Act 1994, which abolished the regions and districts which had been created in 1975, replacing them with single-tier council areas. Aberdeenshire covered the area of the abolished Banff and Buchan, Gordon and Kincardine and Deeside districts, all of which had been part of the Grampian region. It is named after the historic county of Aberdeenshire, but covers a larger area, also including most of the historic county of Kincardineshire and eastern parts of the historic county of Banffshire.

== Governance ==
The council is the fifth largest Scottish council by number of councillors, having 70 members.

The council has devolved power to six area committees: Banff and Buchan; Buchan; Formartine; Garioch; Marr; and Kincardine and Mearns. Each area committee takes decisions on local issues such as planning applications, and the split is meant to reflect the diverse circumstances of each area.

=== Political control ===
Following the 2017 election a coalition of the Conservatives, Liberal Democrats and some of the independent councillors formed to run the council. The same parties continued running the council in coalition following the 2022 election.

The first election to the council was held in 1995. It initially operated as a shadow authority alongside the outgoing authorities until the new system came into force on 1 April 1996. Aberdeenshire Council has been under no overall control since its creation.

Party in control	Years
No overall control	1996–present

=== Leadership ===
The role of provost is largely ceremonial in Aberdeenshire. They chair full council meetings and act as the council's civic figurehead. Political leadership is provided by the leader of the council. The leaders since 1996 have been:

Councillor	Party	From	To	Notes
Audrey Findlay	Liberal Democrats	1 Apr 1996	May 2007	
Anne Robertson	Liberal Democrats	17 May 2007	2 May 2012	
Jim Gifford	Conservative	17 May 2012	8 Jun 2015	
Richard Thomson	SNP	8 Jun 2015	29 Sep 2016	Co-leaders
Martin Kitts-Hayes	Independent	8 Jun 2015	29 Sep 2016	Co-leaders
Richard Thomson	SNP	29 Sep 2016	May 2017	Co-leaders
Alison Evison	Labour	29 Sep 2016	May 2017	Co-leaders
Jim Gifford	Conservative	18 May 2017	Jun 2020	
Jim Gifford	Independent	Jun 2020	19 Nov 2020	
Andy Kille	Conservative	19 Nov 2020	May 2022	
Mark Findlater	Conservative	19 May 2022	28 Jun 2023	
Gillian Owen	Conservative	29 Jun 2023	25 Jun 2025	
Stewart Adams	Conservative	26 Jun 2025		Co-leaders
Anne Stirling	Liberal Democrats	26 Jun 2025		Co-leaders

=== Composition ===
Following the 2022 election and subsequent changes of allegiance up to October 2026, the composition of the council was:

Party	Seats
Conservative	20
SNP	19
Liberal Democrats	14
Reform	7
Independent	10
Total	70

Of the independent councillors, six form the 'Aligned Independents' group, which forms part of the council's administration in coalition with the Conservatives and Liberal Democrats. The next election is due in 2027. Two Conservative councillors who defected to Reform UK in October 2024 were the party's first representatives in Scotland.

== Premises ==
The council is based at Woodhill House in Aberdeen, outside the council's own territory. The building was completed in 1977 for the former Grampian Regional Council.

== Elections ==
Since 2007 elections have been held every five years under the single transferable vote system, introduced by the Local Governance (Scotland) Act 2004. Election results since 1995 have been as follows:

Year	Seats	Conservative	SNP	Liberal Democrats	Labour	Green	Independent / Other	Notes
1995	47	4	15	15	0	0	13	
1999	68	7	23	28	0	0	10	New ward boundaries.
2003	68	11	18	28	0	0	11	
2007	68	14	22	24	0	0	8	
2012	68	14	28	12	2	1	11	
2017	70	23	21	14	1	1	10	
2022	70	26	21	14	0	0	9	

== Wards ==
Map of the area's ward (2017 configuration).

The council has 70 councillors, elected by single transferable vote in 19 multi-member wards:

Ward number	Ward	Members
1	Banff and District	3
2	Troup	3
3	Fraserburgh and District	4
4	Central Buchan	4
5	Peterhead North and Rattray	4
6	Peterhead South and Cruden	3
7	Turriff and District	4
8	Mid Formartine	4
9	Ellon and District	4
10	West Garioch	3
11	Inverurie and District	4
12	East Garioch	4
13	Westhill and District	4
14	Huntly, Strathbogie and Howe of Alford	4
15	Aboyne, Upper Deeside and Donside	3
16	Banchory and Mid Deeside	3
17	North Kincardine	4
18	Stonehaven and Lower Deeside	4
19	Mearns	4
