= 2017 Aberdeenshire Council election =

Local elections

- 4 May 2017

All 70 seats to Aberdeenshire Council 36 seats needed for a majority

	First party	Second party	Third party
Leader	Jim Gifford	Richard Thomson	Peter Argyle
Party	Conservative	SNP	Liberal Democrats
Leader's seat	Mid Formartine	Ellon and District	Aboyne, Upper Deeside and Donside
Last election	14 seats, 21.2%	28 seats, 38.9%	12 seats, 15.4%
Seats won	23	21	14
Seat change	▲9	▼7	▲2
Popular vote	37,291	26,180	13,355
Percentage	40.1%	28.2%	14.4%
Swing	▲18.9%	▼10.7%	▼1.0%
	Fourth party	Fifth party	Sixth party
Leader	Norman Smith	Alison Evison	Martin Ford
Party	Independent	Labour	Green
Last election	11 seats, 14.7%	2 seats, 6.8%	1 seat, 2.4%
Seats after	10	1	1
Seat change	▼1	▼1	0
Popular vote	10,168	4,094	1,781
Percentage	10.9%	4.4%	1.9%
Swing	▼3.8%	▼2.4%	▼0.5%
- 2017 Aberdeenshire Council Election Results Map
Council Leader before election
Hamish Vernal
SNP
Council Leader after election
Jim Gifford
Conservative

Elections to Aberdeenshire Council were held on 4 May 2017, on the same day as the other Scottish local government elections. The election used the 19 wards created as a result of the Local Governance (Scotland) Act 2004, with each ward electing three or four councillors using the single transferable vote system form of proportional representation, with 70 councillors being elected, an increase of two members compared to 2012.

The Conservatives returned the most councillors, the first time it has been the largest party in the region since 1982, when the area was under the Grampian Regional Council, although they fell short of an overall majority. The number of Scottish National Party (SNP) councillors fell by seven but remained the second largest group. The Liberal Democrats picked up two seats while the other parties achieved roughly the same results as the previous election in 2012.

After negotiations, on 18 May 2017, the Conservatives, Liberal Democrats and Aligned Independents formed an administration, with Conservative councillor Jim Gifford being elected as council leader and Liberal Democrat councillor Bill Howatson being elected Provost.

== Background ==
=== Previous election ===
At the previous election in 2012 the SNP won 28 seats, becoming the largest party on the council for the first time since 1995, replacing the Liberal Democrats. However, the SNP was still short of 7 seats for an overall majority. The Conservative, Liberal Democrat and Independent groups all fell well short of an overall majority. It must also be noted that in 2012 there were only 68 seats on the council.

2012 Aberdeenshire Council election result
Party	Seats	Vote share
SNP	28	38.9%
Conservative	14	21.2%
Liberal Democrats	12	15.4%
Independent	11	14.7%
Labour	2	6.8%
Scottish Greens	1	2.4%

=== Composition ===
There were several defections during the 2012-17 term, and 4 by-elections. One by-election resulted in an SNP gain from Conservative. Two by-elections resulted in Conservative gains from the Liberal Democrats, and the other resulted in a Conservative gain from the SNP.

Composition of Aberdeenshire Council
Party	2012 election	Dissolution
SNP	28	25
Conservative	14	17
Liberal Democrats	12	9
Independent	11	14
Labour	2	2
Scottish Greens	1	1

== Results ==
2017 Aberdeenshire Council election result
Party	Seats	Gains	Losses	Net gain/loss	Seats %	Votes %	Votes	+/−
Conservative	23	9	0	▲9	32.9	40.1	37,291	▲18.9
SNP	21	0	7	▼7	30.0	28.2	26,180	▼10.7
Liberal Democrats	14	2	0	▲2	20.0	14.4	13,355	▼1.0
Independent	10	2	3	▼1	14.3	10.9	10,168	▼3.8
Labour	1	0	1	▼1	1.4	4.4	4,094	▼2.4
Green	1	0	0	Steady	1.4	1.9	1,781	▼0.5
Scottish Libertarian	0	0	0	Steady	0.0	0.1	79	New
SDP	0	0	0	Steady	0.0	0.1	48	New
Total	68						92,996	

Note: "Votes" are the first preference votes. The net gain/loss and percentage changes relate to the result of the previous Scottish local elections on 3 May 2012. This may differ from other published sources showing gain/loss relative to seats held at dissolution of Scotland's councils.

== Ward results ==
=== Banff and District ===
- 2012: 2 x SNP, 1 x Conservative
- 2017: 1 x SNP, 1 x Conservative, 1 x Independent
- 2012-2017: 1 x Independent gain from SNP

Banff and District - 3 seats
Party	Candidate	FPv%	Count
Party	Candidate	FPv%	1
Conservative	Mike Roy (incumbent)	36.18%	1,509
Independent	John B. Cox (incumbent)	26.18%	1,092
SNP	Glen Reynolds	25.15%	1,049
Liberal Democrats	Alison Simpson	12.49%	521
Electorate: 9,187 Valid: 4,171 Spoilt: 53 Quota: 1,043 Turnout: 46.0%

=== Troup ===
- 2012: 1 x SNP, 1 x Independent, 1 x Conservative
- 2017: 1 x SNP, 1 x Independent, 1 x Conservative
- 2012-2017 Change: No Change

Troup - 3 seats
Party	Candidate	FPv%	Count					
Party	Candidate	FPv%	1	2	3	4	5	6
Conservative	Mark Findlater (incumbent)	44.79%	1,535					
Independent	Hamish Partridge (incumbent)	14.97%	513	721	759	912		
SNP	Ross Cassie (incumbent)	20.63%	707	740	759	795	804	1,165
SNP	Ricky Taylor	11.47%	393	406	420	438	443	
Liberal Democrats	Sandy Leslie	4.17%	143	278	355			
Labour	Ray Stephen	3.97%	136	201				
Electorate: 7,902 Valid: 3,427 Spoilt: 68 Quota: 857 Turnout: 44.20%

=== Fraserburgh and District ===
- 2012: 2 x SNP, 2 x Independent
- 2017: 2 x SNP, 1 x Conservative, 1 x Independent
- 2012-2017 Change: 1 x Conservative gain from Independent

Fraserburgh and District - 4 seats
Party	Candidate	FPv%	Count								
Party	Candidate	FPv%	1	2	3	4	5	6	7	8	9
Conservative	Andy Kille	24.10%	1,229								
Independent	Doreen Mair	14.57%	743	781	790	873	950	1,061			
SNP	Charles Cummin Buchan (incumbent)	12.04%	614	617	758	783	811	855	859	910	999
SNP	Brian Topping (incumbent)	12.78%	652	653	709	731	763	776	780	827	968
Independent	Ian Tait (incumbent)	9.73%	496	529	532	564	590	637	644	743	
Independent	Michael Watt (incumbent)	6.45%	329	352	359	397	429	470	478		
Liberal Democrats	Ann Bell	5.14%	262	292	299	313	362				
Labour	Kenneth Watt	5.23%	267	282	287	311					
Independent	Charlie Reid	4.94%	252	258	267						
SNP	David Donn	5.02%	256	257							
Electorate: TBC Valid: 5,100 Spoilt: 93 Quota: 1,021 Turnout: 42.9%

=== Central Buchan ===
- 2012: 2 x SNP, 1 x Conservative, 1 x Independent
- 2017: 1 x SNP, 1 x Conservative, 1 x Liberal Democrat, 1 x Independent
- 2012-2017: Change: 1 x Liberal Democrat gain from SNP

Central Buchan - 4 seats
Party	Candidate	FPv%	Count				
Party	Candidate	FPv%	1	2	3	4	5
Conservative	Marion Buchan	37.28%	1,808				
SNP	Jim Ingram (incumbent)	24.50%	1,188				
Independent	Norman Smith (incumbent)	17.79%	863	1,133			
Liberal Democrats	Anne Simpson	10.41%	505	760	777	854	1,169
SNP	Lenny Pirie (incumbent)	10.02%	486	518	700	728	
Electorate: TBC Valid: 4,850 Spoilt: 66 Quota: 971 Turnout: 44.3%

=== Peterhead North and Rattray ===
- 2012: 2 x SNP, 2 x Independent
- 2017: 2 x Independent, 1 x SNP, 1 x Conservative
- 2012-2017 Change: 1 x Conservative gain from SNP

Peterhead North and Rattray - 4 seats
Party	Candidate	FPv%	Count					
Party	Candidate	FPv%	1	2	3	4	5	6
Conservative	Dianne Beagrie	41.33%	1,899					
SNP	Anne Allan (incumbent)	22.02%	1,012					
Independent	Alan S. Buchan (incumbent)	12.77%	587	855	861	925		
Independent	Iain Sutherland	9.64%	443	658	661	728	731	972
SNP	Fiona McRae (incumbent)	11.95%	549	593	667	689	690	
Liberal Democrats	Alistair Massey	2.29%	105	228	230			
Electorate: TBC Valid: 4,595 Spoilt: 95 Quota: 920 Turnout: 39.0%

=== Peterhead South and Cruden ===
- 2012: 2 x SNP, 1 x Independent
- 2017: 1 x SNP, 1 x Conservative, 1 x Independent
- 2012-2017 Change: Conservatives gain one seat from SNP

Peterhead South and Cruden - 3 seats
Party	Candidate	FPv%	Count				
Party	Candidate	FPv%	1	2	3	4	5
Conservative	Alan Fakley	37.00%	1,364				
SNP	Stephen William Smith (incumbent)	21.35%	787	801	828	857	1,384
SNP	Stuart Wallace Pratt (incumbent)	15.16%	559	567	583	616	
Independent	Stephen Calder	14.02%	517	618	719	909	932
Independent	Sam Coull	7.40%	273	351	416		
Liberal Democrats	Colin Simpson	5.07%	187	289			
Electorate: TBC Valid: 3,687 Spoilt: 82 Quota: 922 Turnout: 40.8%

=== Turriff and District ===
- 2012: 1 x SNP, 1 x Liberal Democrat, 1 x Independent
- 2017: 1 x SNP, 1 x Conservative, 1 x Liberal Democrat, 1 x Independent
- 2012-2017 Change: 1 x Conservative win due to one additional seat compared to 2012

Turriff and District - 4 seats
Party	Candidate	FPv%	Count				
Party	Candidate	FPv%	1	2	3	4	5
Conservative	Iain Taylor*	37.36%	1,854				
SNP	Alastair Forsyth	25.39%	1,260				
Liberal Democrats	Anne Robertson (incumbent)	19.77%	981	1,324			
Independent	Sandy Duncan (incumbent)	10.96%	544	682	802	918	1,262
Independent	Mike Rawlins	6.53%	324	429	514	559	
Electorate: TBC Valid: 4,963 Spoilt: 52 Quota: 993 Turnout: 46.8%

- = Sitting Councillor for Banff and District Ward.

=== Mid-Formartine ===
- 2012: 2 x SNP, 1 x Conservative, 1 x Independent
- 2017: 1 x SNP, 1 x Conservative, 1 x Liberal Democrat, 1 x Independent
- 2012-2017 Change: 1 x Liberal Democrat gain from SNP

Mid-Formartine - 4 seats
Party	Candidate	FPv%	Count						
Party	Candidate	FPv%	1	2	3	4	5	6	7
Conservative	Jim Gifford (incumbent)	34.61%	1,797						
Independent	Paul Johnston (incumbent)	20.61%	1,070						
SNP	Karen Adam	19.99%	1,038	1,057					
Liberal Democrats	Andrew Hassan	9.46%	491	724	731	731	860	930	1,227
Independent	Jeff Goodhall	4.79%	249	456	467	468	534	627	
SNP	Cryle Shand (incumbent)	5.82%	302	310	314	329	358		
Labour	Kirsten Muat	4.72%	245	301	303	303			
Electorate: TBC Valid: 5,192 Spoilt: 43 Quota: 1,039 Turnout: 46.1%

=== Ellon and District ===
- 2012: 2xSNP; 1xCon; 1xLib Dem
- 2017: 2xSNP; 1xCon; 1xLib Dem
- 2012-2017 Change: no change

Ellon and District - 4 seats
Party	Candidate	FPv%	Count			
Party	Candidate	FPv%	1	2	3	4
Conservative	Gillian Louise Owen (incumbent)	40.94	2,258			
Liberal Democrats	Isobel Davidson (incumbent)	19.71	1,087	1,703.86		
SNP	Richard Thomson (incumbent)	17.9	987	1,034.02	1,093.74	1,264.34
SNP	Anouk Kahanov-Kloppert	13.93	768	793.55	843.88	1,024.70
Labour	John Morgan	7.52	415	548.39	835.99	
Electorate: TBC Valid: 5,515 Spoilt: 64 Quota: 1,104 Turnout: 5,579 (47.2%)

=== West Garioch ===
- 2012: 1xSNP; 1xLib Dem; 1xCon
- 2017: 1xSNP; 1xLib Dem; 1xCon
- 2012-2017 Change: No change

West Garioch - 3 seats
Party	Candidate	FPv%	Count					
Party	Candidate	FPv%	1	2	3	4	5	6
Conservative	Sebastian Leslie	42.49	1,809					
SNP	Victoria Harper	19.73	840	858.10	874.33	879.02	979.03	1,487.26
Liberal Democrats	Hazel Smith	15.64	666	1,011.06	1,155.76			
SNP	Elaine Mitchell	10.31	439	450.52	460.75	465.65	577.54	
Green	Richard Paul Openshaw	7.19	306	353.71	401.52	436.47		
Labour	Peter Young	4.63	197	266.5				
Electorate: TBC Valid: 4,257 Spoilt: 53 Quota: 1,065 Turnout: 4,310 (47.6%)

=== Inverurie and District ===
- 2012: 2xSNP; 1xCon; 1xLib Dem
- 2017: 1xSNP; 1xCon; 1xLibDem; 1xIndependent
- 2012-2017 Change: Independent gain one seat from SNP

Inverurie and District - 4 seats
Party	Candidate	FPv%	Count			
Party	Candidate	FPv%	1	2	3	4
Conservative	Colin Clark (incumbent)	35.95	1,732			
SNP	Neil Baillie	22.52	1,085			
Independent	Judy Margaret Whyte	20.38	982			
Liberal Democrats	Marion Ewenson	11.79	568	951.1	958.69	965.63
SNP	Bryan Hunter Stuart (incumbent)	5.09	245	261.41	360.1	362.9
Labour	Sarah Flavell	4.28	206	265.42	269.77	271.69
Electorate: TBC Valid: 4,818 Spoilt: 48 Quota: 964 Turnout: 4,866 (43.3%)

=== East Garioch ===
- 2012: 1xSNP; 1xGRN; 1xLib Dem
- 2017: 1xSNP; 1xGRN; 1xLib Dem; 1xCon
- 2012-2017 Change: One additional seat in the Ward, gained by Conservatives

East Garioch - 4 seats
Party	Candidate	FPv%	Count					
Party	Candidate	FPv%	1	2	3	4	5	6
Conservative	Dominic Lonchay	31.34	1,429					
Green	Martin Anthony Ford (incumbent)	18.64	850	921.27				
Liberal Democrats	Fergie Hood (incumbent)	18.47	842	1,077.53				
SNP	Glen Reid	15.09	688	695.96	706.30	707.68	752.38	1,360.51
SNP	Conor McKay	12.52	571	577.87	590.28	591.88	658.89	
Labour	Ann Thorpe	3.93	179	228.57	294.78	297.37		
Electorate: TBC Valid: 4,559 Spoilt: 37 Quota: 912 Turnout: 4,596 (45.17%)

=== Westhill and District ===
- 2012: 2xSNP; 1xCon; 1xLib Dem
- 2017: 2xCon; 1xSNP; 1xLibDem
- 2012-2017 Change: Conservatives gain one seat from SNP

Westhill and District - 4 seats
Party	Candidate	FPv%	Count						
Party	Candidate	FPv%	1	2	3	4	5	6	7
Conservative	Ron McKail (incumbent)	33.67	2,019						
Liberal Democrats	Iris Margaret Walker (incumbent)	22.85	1,370						
SNP	David Robert Aitchison (incumbent)	14.63	877	884.71	893.94	912.92	921.93	987.15	1,603.65
Conservative	Alistair McKelvie	13.81	828	1,564					
SNP	Heather Coull	9.29	557	561.06	567.94	584.07	593.09	689.29	
Labour	Lindsey Kirkhill	4.44	266	279.39	331.55	377.96	422.04		
Scottish Libertarian	Derek Scott	1.31	79	83.46	114.63	126.79			
Electorate: TBC Valid: 5,996 Spoilt: 65 Quota: 1,200 Turnout: 6,061 (50.4%)

=== Huntly, Strathbogie and Howe of Alford ===
- 2012: 1xCon; 1xSNP; 1xLib Dem; 1xIndependent
- 2017: 2xCon; 1xSNP; 1xLibDem
- 2012-2017 Change: Conservatives gain one seat from Independent

Huntly, Strathbogie and Howe of Alford - 4 seats
Party	Candidate	FPv%	Count					
Party	Candidate	FPv%	1	2	3	4	5	6
Conservative	Moira Ingleby (incumbent)	30.69	1,741					
Conservative	Robbie Withey	20.43	1,159					
Liberal Democrats	John Latham (incumbent)	17.54	995	1,212.54				
SNP	Gwyneth Petrie (incumbent)	15.78	895	924.24	930.54	931.06	994.03	1,639.02
SNP	Kate Monahan	10.38	589	594.92	601.66	602.01	701.6	
Labour	Bryan Begg	5.18	294	363.27	390.63	396.05		
Electorate: TBC Valid: 5,673 Spoilt: 112 Quota: 1,135 Turnout: 5,785 (47.8%)

=== Aboyne, Upper Deeside and Donside ===
- 2012: 1xCon; 1xSNP; 1xLib Dem
- 2017: 1xCon; 1xSNP; 1xLib Dem
- 2012-2017 Change: No change

Aboyne, Upper Deeside and Donside - 3 seats
Party	Candidate	FPv%	Count	
Party	Candidate	FPv%	1	2
Conservative	Paul Gibb	43.97	2,093	
SNP	Geva Blackett (incumbent)	29.66	1,364	
Liberal Democrats	Peter Argyle (incumbent)	18.91	900	1,307.70
Independent	Anne Reid	4.74	226	338.17
Labour	Claire Miller	3.7	176	238.99
Electorate: TBC Valid: 4,759 Spoilt: 32 Quota: 1,190 Turnout: 4,791 (53.2%)

=== Banchory and Mid-Deeside ===
- 2012: 1xCon; 1xSNP; 1xLib Dem
- 2017: 1xCon; 1xSNP; 1xLib Dem
- 2012-2017 Change: No change

Banchory and Mid-Deeside - 3 seats
Party	Candidate	FPv%	Count			
Party	Candidate	FPv%	1	2	3	4
Conservative	Ann Ross	52.8	2,525			
SNP	Eileen Durno	21.89	1,046	1,088.11	1,162.35	1,417.64
Liberal Democrats	Rosemary Bruce	20.25	968	1,689.6		
Labour	Iain Gillies	5.04	241	352.58	596.12	
Electorate: TBC Valid: 4,780 Spoilt: 33 Quota: 1,196 Turnout: 4,813 (54.6%)

=== North Kincardine ===
- 2012: 1xSNP; 1xLab; 1xCon; 1xLib Dem
- 2017: 1xSNP; 1xLab; 1xCon; 1xLib Dem
- 2012-2017 Change: No change

North Kincardine - 4 seats
Party	Candidate	FPv%	Count		
Party	Candidate	FPv%	1	2	3
Conservative	Colin Pike	30.46	1,685		
Liberal Democrats	Ian Mollison (incumbent)	22.08	1,221		
SNP	Alastair Bews (incumbent)	20.55	1,138		
Labour	Alison Evison (incumbent)	16.27	901	1,074.91	1,124.67
SNP	Kes Smith	6.47	358	375.49	387.16
Green	William Ball	3.25	180	224.25	237.88
SDP	David Lansdell	0.87	48	95.34	100.66
Electorate: TBC Valid: 5,531 Spoilt: 48 Quota: 1,107 Turnout: 5,579

=== Stonehaven and Lower Deeside ===
- 2012: 1xCon; 1xSNP; 1xLab; 1xLib Dem
- 2017: 2xCon; 1xSNP; 1xLibDem
- 2012-2017 Change: Conservatives gain one seat from Labour

Stonehaven and Lower Deeside - 4 seats
Party	Candidate	FPv%	Count				
Party	Candidate	FPv%	1	2	3	4	5
Conservative	Wendy Agnew (incumbent)	30.83	1,703				
SNP	Dennis Robertson	23.54	1,300				
Liberal Democrats	Sarah Dickinson	17.09	944	1,030.38	1,057.08	1,084.63	1,155.68
Conservative	Sandy Wallace	14.85	820	1,196.42			
Labour	Raymond Christie (incumbent)	6.36	351	381.9	403.05	410.4	457.09
Green	Rachel Shanks	3.84	212	223.24	312.79	316.27	365.31
Independent	Philip Bishop	3.49	193	217.23	229.83	243.06	
Electorate: TBC Valid: 5,523 Spoilt: 87 Quota: 1,105 Turnout: 5,610 (49.7%)

=== Mearns ===
- 2012: 1xCon; 1xSNP; 1xLib Dem; 1xIndependent
- 2017: 2xCon; 1xSNP; 1xLibDem
- 2012-2017 Change: Conservatives gain one seat from Independent

Mearns - 4 seats
Party	Candidate	FPv%	Count						
Party	Candidate	FPv%	1	2	3	4	5	6	7
Conservative	George Carr (incumbent)	36.19	2,034						
SNP	Leigh Wilson	16.03	901	914.41	935.75	936.02	997.27	1,045.19	1,735.42
SNP	Carole Wise	12.46	700	705.36	715.36	715.57	751.47	815.73	
Liberal Democrats	Bill Howatson (incumbent)	10.66	599	701.79	767.94	772.58	863.53	1,100.31	1,145.13
Independent	Dave Stewart (incumbent)	8.4	472	517.14	546.48	549.66	596.82		
Conservative	Jeff Hutchison	8.2	461	1,116.16	1,141.52				
Green	Karen Allan	4.15	233	248.19	284.09	284.94			
Labour	Patrick Coffield	3.91	220	237.43					
Electorate: TBC Valid: 5,620 Spoilt: 70 Quota: 1,125 Turnout: 5,690 (48.3%)

== Aftermath ==
As no single party group on the council won enough seats to form an administration with an overall majority, the Conservatives, Liberal Democrats and Aligned Independents groups formed an administration on 18 May 2017, after negotiations. As part of the deal, Conservative councillor for Mid-Formartine Cllr Jim Gifford was elected as council leader and Liberal Democrat councillor for Mearns, Cllr Bill Howatson was elected as Provost.

West Garioch Conservative Cllr Sebastian Leslie was suspended from the party on 18 September 2018 and became an independent having refused to pay his Council Tax.

Stonehaven and Lower Deeside Conservative Cllr Sandy Wallace resigned from the party and became an independent on 12 December 2018 citing he had no faith in either the Prime Minister or the Conservative controlled Coalition in Aberdeenshire. On 10 November 2020, the Scottish Libertarian Party announced that Wallace had joined the party.

North Kincardine Conservative Cllr Colin Pike resigned from the party and became an independent on 6 March 2020.

Mearns SNP Cllr Leigh Wilson resigned from the party and became an independent on 15 May 2020 citing professional circumstances.

North Kincardine SNP Cllr Alistair Bews resigned from the party and became an independent on 17 May 2020 citing personal and professional reasons.

On 1 June 2020 Mid-Formantine Conservative Cllr Jim Gifford was replaced as Leader of the council and became an independent. He was followed by Lesley Berry (Inverurie) and Jeff Hutchinson (Mearns).

On 7 June 2020 Banff Conservative Cllr Mike Roy resigned from the party and became an independent.

=== By-elections ===
==== Inverurie & District by-election ====
On 12 October 2017 a by-election was held after Inverurie & District Conservative Cllr Colin Clark was elected as an MP for Gordon on 8 June 2017. He resigned his council seat on 28 June 2017. The Conservative candidate Lesley Berry held the seat for her party.

Inverurie & District By-election (12 October 2017) - 1 Seat
Party	Candidate	FPv%	Count			
Party	Candidate	FPv%	1	2	3	4
Conservative	Lesley Berry	48.53%	1,672	1,679	1,715	1,871
SNP	Elaine Mitchell	33.27%	1,146	1,161	1,234	1,300
Liberal Democrats	Scott Bremner	8.56%	295	309	412	
Labour	Sarah Flavell	8.01%	276	290		
Green	Craig Stewart	1.62%	56			
Electorate: NA Valid: 3,445 Spoilt: 26 Quota: 1,723 Turnout: 30.9%

==== Ellon & District by-election ====
On 15 October a by-election was held after Ellon & District SNP Cllr Richard Thomson was elected an MP for Gordon in the 2019 UK general election. He resigned his Council seat in April 2020. The SNP candidate Louise Mcallister held the seat for her party.

Ellon & District By-election (15 October 2020) - 1 Seat
Party	Candidate	FPv%	Count			
Party	Candidate	FPv%	1	2	3	4
SNP	Louise Mcallister	42.4	1,683	1,725	1,757	1,916
Conservative	John Crawley	41.7	1,658	1,663	1,679	1,840
Liberal Democrats	Trevor Mason	10.2	405	443	485	
Labour	John Bennett	2.9	114	126		
Green	Peter Kennedy	2.8	112			
Electorate: 11,893 Valid: 3,972 Spoilt: 34 Quota: 1,987 Turnout: 4,006 (33.7%)

==== East Garioch by-election ====
On 17 June 2021 a by-election was held after East Garioch Lib Dem Councillor Fergus Hood died in March 2021 following a prolonged illness. The Conservative candidate David Keating won the seat from the Liberal Democrats.

East Garioch By-election (17 June 2021) - 1 Seat
Party	Candidate	FPv%	Count			
Party	Candidate	FPv%	1	2	3	4
Conservative	David Keating	45.5	1,240	1,261	1,268	1,394
SNP	Dan Ritchie	35.3	963	982	1,058	1,146
Liberal Democrats	Trevor Mason	10.3	281	319	365	
Green	Jamie Ogilvie	4.8	130	143		
Labour	Andy Brown	4.1	111			
Electorate: 10,445 Valid: 2,725 Spoilt: 15 Quota: 1,363 Turnout: 26.2%

==== Mid-Formartine by-election ====
On 19 August a by-election was held after Mid-Formartine SNP Cllr Karen Adam resigned her seat upon being elected a MSP to the Scottish Parliament for Banffshire and Buchan Coast on 3 June 2021. The Conservative candidate Sheila Powell won the seat from the SNP.

Mid-Formartine By-election (19 August 2021) - 1 Seat
Party	Candidate	FPv%	Count
Party	Candidate	FPv%	1
Conservative	Sheila Powell	45.7	1,480
SNP	Jenny Nicol	37.2	1,205
Liberal Democrats	Jeff Goodhall	12.7	412
Green	Peter Kennedy	4.4	144
