= 2012 Aberdeenshire Council election =

2012 Scottish local government election

- 3 May 2012

All 68 seats to Aberdeenshire Council 35 seats needed for a majority
	First party	Second party	Third party
Leader	Richard Thomson	Jim Gifford	Karen Clark
Party	SNP	Conservative	Liberal Democrats
Last election	22 seats, 34.5%	14 seats, 20.8%	24 seats, 25.2%
Seats won	28	14	12
Seat change	▲6	Steady	▼12
Popular vote	27,336	14,907	10,797
Percentage	38.9%	21.2%	15.4%
Swing	▲4.4%	▲0.4%	▼9.8%
	Fourth party	Fifth party	Sixth party
Leader	Norman Smith	Alison Evison	Martin Ford
Party	Independent	Labour	Green
Last election	8 seats, 12.7%	0 seats, 5.4%	0 seats, 1.1%
Seats won	11	2	1
Seat change	▲3	▲2	▲1
Popular vote	10,320	4,785	1,681
Percentage	14.7%	6.8%	2.4%
Swing	▲2.0%	▲1.4%	▲1.3%
- 2012 Aberdeenshire Council Election Results Map
Council Leader before election
Anne Robertson
Liberal Democrats
Council Leader after election
Jim Gifford
Conservative

Elections to Aberdeenshire Council were held on 3 May 2012, on the same day as the other Scottish local government elections. The election used the 19 wards created as a result of the Local Governance (Scotland) Act 2004, with each ward electing three or four Councillors using the single transferable vote system form of proportional representation, with 68 Councillors being elected.

The 2007 election saw the Liberal Democrats form a coalition on the Council with the Scottish Conservatives.

The 2012 election saw the SNP gain an additional 6 seats and become the largest party on the Council, supplanting the Lib Dems. The Tories retained their 14 seats on the Council and as a result became the second largest party. The Lib Dems lost half their Councillors falling from 24 to 12 seats. Independents also increased their overall numbers to 11 seats while Labour and the Scottish Green Party won seats in Aberdeenshire for the first time.

Following the election a Conservative-Lib Dem-Independent administration was formed. However, on 8 June 2015, a new administration was formed by the SNP and a 'Progressive Alliance' between Scottish Labour and 2 Progressive Independent councillors, who had been members of the previous administration.

== Background ==
=== Previous election ===
At the previous election in 2007 the Liberal Democrats won 24 seats, falling 11 seats short of an overall majority. The SNP won 22 seats, falling 13 seats short of an overall majority. Both the Conservative and Independent groups fell well short of an overall majority.

2007 Aberdeenshire Council election result
Party	Seats	Vote share
Liberal Democrats	24	25.2%
SNP	22	34.5%
Conservative	14	20.8%
Independent	8	12.7%

=== Composition ===
There were 2 by-elections in the 2007-12 term. One was in the Troup ward, which was held by the SNP. The other by-election was in the Aboyne, Upper Deeside and Donside ward, which resulted in a Liberal Democrat gain from Conservative.

Composition of Aberdeenshire Council
Party	2007 election	Dissolution
Liberal Democrats	24	21
SNP	22	21
Conservative	14	13
Independent	8	11
Scottish Greens	0	2

== Results ==
2012 Aberdeenshire Council election result
Party	Seats	Gains	Losses	Net gain/loss	Seats %	Votes %	Votes	+/−
SNP	28	7	1	▲6	41.2	38.9	27,336	▲4.4
Conservative	14	2	2	Steady	20.6	21.2	14,907	▲0.4
Liberal Democrats	12	0	12	▼12	17.7	15.4	10,797	▼9.8
Independent	11	3	0	▲3	16.2	14.7	10,320	▲2.0
Labour	2	2	0	▲2	2.9	6.8	4,785	▲1.4
Green	1	1	0	▲1	1.5	2.4	1,681	▲1.3
Scottish Christian	0	0	0	Steady	0.0	0.7	460	New
Total	68						70,286	

Note: "Votes" are the first preference votes. The net gain/loss and percentage changes relate to the result of the previous Scottish local elections on 3 May 2007. This may differ from other published sources showing gain/loss relative to seats held at dissolution of Scotland's councils.

== Ward results ==
=== Banff and District ===
- 2007: 1xSNP; 1xLib Dem; 1xIndependent
- 2012: 2xSNP; 1xCon
- 2007-2012: SNP and Con gain one seat from Independent and Lib Dem

Banff and District - 3 seats
Party	Candidate	FPv%	Count			
Party	Candidate	FPv%	1	2	3	4
SNP	John B. Cox (incumbent)†††††††††	31.24	1,037			
SNP	Ian Gray (incumbent)††††††††	24.19	803	959.7		
Conservative	Mike Roy	23.13	768	780.4	793.5	880.3
Liberal Democrats	Alistair Francis Mason	11.12	369	377.8	405.8	508.6
Scottish Christian	Colin Murray	10.30	342	350.4	375.4	
Electorate: 8,661 Valid: 3,319 Spoilt: 50 Quota: 830 Turnout: 3,369 (38.32%)

=== Troup ===
- 2007: 1xSNP; 1xCon; 1xIndependent
- 2012: 1xSNP; 1xIndependent; 1xCon
- 2007-2012 Change: No change

Troup - 3 seats
Party	Candidate	FPv%	Count						
Party	Candidate	FPv%	1	2	3	4	5	6	7
SNP	Hamish Partridge†††††††	25.44	723						
Conservative	John Duncan (incumbent) †††	20.87	593	593.5	604.5	615.5	645.6	709.6	777.6
Independent	Mark Findlater††††††	15.52	441	441.1	446.2	479.2	520.2	683.3	796.9
SNP	Bob Watson (incumbent)	14.25	405	414.2	421.2	438.4	467.4	550.6	
Independent	Sydney Mair (incumbent)	12.10	344	344.5	346.5	366.5	393.6		
Labour	Alan Duffill	6.51	185	185.2	195.2	199.2			
Independent	Bill Rebecca	3.34	95	95.5	108.5				
Liberal Democrats	Sandy Leslie	1.97	56	56.1					
Electorate: 7,609 Valid: 2,842 Spoilt: 37 Quota: 711 Turnout: 2,879 (37.35%)

=== Fraserburgh and District ===
- 2007: 3xSNP; 1xIndependent
- 2012: 2xSNP; 2xIndependent
- 2007-2012 Change: Independent gain one seat from SNP

Fraserburgh and District - 4 seats
Party	Candidate	FPv%	Count								
Party	Candidate	FPv%	1	2	3	4	5	6	7	8	9
SNP	Brian Topping (incumbent)	25.1	1,056								
SNP	Charles Cummin Buchan	16.72	704	787.7	792.9	802.1	817.7	1,040.6			
Independent	Ian Tait (incumbent)	14.65	617	637.2	644.6	666.9	723.6	733.9	759.3	836.1	993.3
Independent	Michael Watt (incumbent)	9.90	417	432.3	446.3	466.5	515.5	528.9	547.7	627.9	783.6
Independent	Doreen Mair	8.81	371	379.5	410.5	436.7	470.9	483.3	498.3	625.9	
Liberal Democrats	Ann Bell	7.65	322	326.8	334.0	361.4	420.1	427.3	446.3		
Conservative	Bob Sim	6.15	259	261.6	266.6	275.6					
SNP	Ricky Sheaffe-Greene	4.89	206	270.3	273.5	280.7	282.7				
Labour	Ashara Taylor	4.08	172	173.6	176.8						
Independent	George Esslemont	2.07	87	88.2							
Electorate: 11,117 Valid: 4,211 Spoilt: 65 Quota: 843 Turnout: 4,276 (37.88%)

=== Central Buchan ===
- 2007: 2xIndependent; 1xSNP; 1xCon
- 2012 2xSNP; 1xCon; 1xIndependent
- 2007-2012: Change: SNP gain one seat from Independent

Central Buchan - 4 seats
Party	Candidate	FPv%	Count					
Party	Candidate	FPv%	1	2	3	4	5	6
SNP	Jim Ingram	29.23	1,141					
Independent	Norman Smith (incumbent)	20.70	808					
Conservative	Edie Chapman	19.9	780	791.7				
SNP	Lenny Pirie	11.68	456	746.9	751.4	752.6	768.1	801.0
Liberal Democrats	Anne Simpson	5.64	220	233.3	236.6	238.5	258.2	302.8
Labour	Carol Donald	5.25	205	215.4	216.6	226.4		
Independent	Hugh Livingstone	4.82	188	198.4	206.1	207.9	256.2	302.8
Independent	David S. Ross	2.72	106	112.6	118.6			
Electorate: 10,231 Valid: 3,904 Spoilt: 50 Quota: 781 Turnout: 3,954 (38.16%)

=== Peterhead North and Rattray ===
- 2007: 2xSNP; 1xInd; 1xCon
- 2012: 2xSNP; 2xIndependent
- 2007-2012 Change: Independent gain one seat from Con

Peterhead North and Rattray - 4 seats
Party	Candidate	FPv%	Count								
Party	Candidate	FPv%	1	2	3	4	5	6	7	8	9
SNP	Anne Allan (incumbent)	17.35	618	620	628	647	812				
Independent	Alan S. Buchan (incumbent)	16.47	587	592	623	676	704	716.9			
SNP	Fiona McRae (incumbent)	14.9	534	544	555	561	717				
Independent	Alan Gardiner	14.85	529	548	569	625	646	654.2	654.5	656.5	827.1
Conservative	Sheena Drunsfield	12.55	447	455	470	504	525	531.3	531.5	532.1	
SNP	Michael Doig	11.01	394	400	406	430					
Independent	Stephen William Calder	5.42	193	203	223						
Labour	Thomas Phillips	4.72	168	181							
Liberal Democrats	Graham Smith	2.58	92								
Electorate: 10,787 Valid: 3,562 Spoilt: 62 Quota: 713 Turnout: 3,624 (33.02%)

=== Peterhead South and Cruden ===
- 2007: 2xSNP; 1xLib Dem
- 2012: 2xSNP; 1xIndependent
- 2007-2012 Change: Independent gain one seat from Lib Dem

Peterhead South and Cruden - 3 seats
Party	Candidate	FPv%	Count					
Party	Candidate	FPv%	1	2	3	4	5	6
SNP	Stephen William Smith (incumbent)	34.05	1,030					
SNP	Stuart Wallace Pratt (incumbent)	18.64	564	765.2				
Independent	Sam Coull (incumbent)	15.17	459	477.0	478.6	520.7	603.6	
Independent	Tom Malone	13.82	418	426.5	427.2	592.3	693.9	998.6
Conservative	Steve Owen	9.59	290	296.9	297.2	319.5		
Independent	Peter Stevenson	8.73	264	277.3	278.2			
Electorate: 8,621 Valid: 3,025 Spoilt: 64 Quota: 757 Turnout: 3,089 (35.09%)

=== Turriff and District ===
- 2007: 1xSNP; 1xLib Dem; 1xIndependent
- 2012: 1xSNP; 1xIndependent; 1xLib Dem
- 2007-2012 Change: No change

Turriff and District - 3 seats
Party	Candidate	FPv%	Count				
Party	Candidate	FPv%	1	2	3	4	5
SNP	Sandy Duncan (incumbent)	34.24	1,165				
Liberal Democrats	Anne Robertson (incumbent)	18.43	627	652.6	664.7	842.1	999.0
Independent	Alisan Keith Norrie (incumbent)	16.58	564	590.4	609.9	808.8	1,016.9
Conservative	Jayne James Duff	15.93	542	556.6	569.8		
SNP	Colin Graham Mair	12.70	432	658.4	667.7	742.1	
Scottish Christian	Norman Alexander Ogston	2.12	72	74.9			
Electorate: 9,157 Valid: 3,402 Spoilt: 53 Quota: 851 Turnout: 3,455 (37.15%)

=== Mid-Formartine ===
- 2007: 2xLib Dem; 1xSNP; 1xCon
- 2012: 2xSNP; 1xIndependent; 1xCon
- 2007-2012 Change: SNP and Independent gain one seat from Lib Dem

Mid-Formartine - 4 seats
Party	Candidate	FPv%	Count						
Party	Candidate	FPv%	1	2	3	4	5	6	7
SNP	Allan Hendry (incumbent)	29.12	1,293						
Independent	Paul Johnston (incumbent)	21.12	938						
Conservative	Jim Gifford (incumbent)	16.24	721	735.1	740.8	825.9	895.3		
Liberal Democrats	John Kevin Loveday (incumbent)	9.89	439	458.7	467.4	542.6	658.7	661.1	
Labour	Braden Davy	8.92	396	411.9	416.9	463.8			
Independent	Jeff Goodhall	8.11	360	371.6	387.1				
SNP	Cryle Shand	6.62	294	606.5	612.4	679.6	753.0	753.6	938.0
Electorate: 11,843 Valid: 4,441 Spoilt: 39 Quota: 889 Turnout: 4,480 (37.50%)

=== Ellon and District ===
- 2007: 2xLib Dem; 1xSNP; 1xCon
- 2012: 2xSNP; 1xCon; 1xLib Dem
- 2007-2012 Change: SNP gain one seat from Lib Dem

Ellon and District - 4 seats
Party	Candidate	FPv%	Count				
Party	Candidate	FPv%	1	2	3	4	5
SNP	Rob Merson (incumbent)	39.04	1,644				
Conservative	Gillian Louise Owen (incumbent)	16.74	705	748.8	761.6	839.4	867.1
Liberal Democrats	Isobel Davidson (incumbent)	16.36	689	760.6	800.9	918.6	
SNP	Richard Thomson	11.26	474	1,055.3			
Labour	Peter Thomas Smyth	9.48	399	426.8	457.8	511.5	531.5
Independent	Sandy Allan	7.12	300	325.8	361.7		
Electorate: 11,173 Valid: 4,211 Spoilt: 51 Quota: 843 Turnout: 4,262 (37.69%)

=== West Garioch ===
- 2007: 2xLib Dem; 1xSNP
- 2012: 1xSNP; 1xLib Dem; 1xCon
- 2007-2012 Change: Con gain from Lib Dem

West Garioch - 3 seats
Party	Candidate	FPv%	Count			
Party	Candidate	FPv%	1	2	3	4
SNP	Allison Grant (incumbent)	42.5	1,327			
Conservative	Patricia Oddie	20.8	651	716.3	774.3	826.9
Liberal Democrats	Sheena Margaret Lonchay (incumbent) ††	14.0	439	555.6	645.3	1,052.7
Liberal Democrats	Hazel Linda Al-Kowarri (incumbent)	13.6	426	495.4	601.1	
Green	Richard Paul Openshaw	9.1	283	407.0		
Electorate: 8,621 Valid: 3,126 Spoilt: 27 Quota: 782 Turnout: 3,153 (36.26%)

=== Inverurie and District ===
- 2007: 2xLib Dem; 1xSNP; 1xCon
- 2012: 2xSNP; 1xCon; 1xLib Dem
- 2007-2012 Change: SNP gain one seat from Lib Dem

Inverurie and District - 4 seats
Party	Candidate	FPv%	Count						
Party	Candidate	FPv%	1	2	3	4	5	6	7
SNP	Bryan Hunter Stuart (incumbent)	19.7	688	701					
SNP	Hamish Vernal	17.5	612	621	621.8	643.8	685.8	690.2	806.2
Conservative	Richard Cowling (incumbent)	17.4	608	614	614.0	636.0	684.0	692.1	771.4
Liberal Democrats	Martin Christopher Kitts-Hayes (incumbent) ††	17.3	606	632	632.0	660.0	730.0		
Labour	Ellis Thorpe	13.2	463	477	477.1	503.1	562.1	568.9	
Independent	Mike Raeburn (incumbent)	6.0	211	225	225.0	300.0			
Independent	Ron Reid	5.6	196	212	212.0				
Green	Karen A. MacKenzie	3.2	113						
Electorate: 10,034 Valid: 3,497 Spoilt: 59 Quota: 700 Turnout: 3,556 (34.85%)

=== East Garioch ===
- 2007: 2xLib Dem; 1xSNP
- 2012: 1xSNP; 1xGRN; 1xLib Dem
- 2007-2012 Change: GRN gain from Lib Dem

East Garioch - 3 seats
Party	Candidate	FPv%	Count					
Party	Candidate	FPv%	1	2	3	4	5	6
SNP	Fergie Hood (incumbent) †	35.0	1,140					
Green	Martin Anthony Ford (incumbent)	20.3	660	732.1	784.8	834.9		
Liberal Democrats	Nan Cullinane (incumbent)	15.9	519	574.6	643.7	790.3	798.3	1,080.3
Conservative	Patrick Sleigh	11.0	359	384.7	402.9			
Independent	Amanda Louise Clark	10.4	338	393.9	467.3	569.1	575.1	
Labour	Ann Thorpe	7.4	240	279.1				
Electorate: 9,224 Valid: 3,256 Spoilt: 24 Quota: 815 Turnout: 3,280 (35.30%)

=== Westhill and District ===
- 2007: 1xLib Dem; 1xCon; 1xSNP; 1xIndependent
- 2012: 2xSNP; 1xCon; 1xLib Dem
- 2007-2012 Change: SNP gain one seat from Independent

Westhill and District - 4 seats
Party	Candidate	FPv%	Count				
Party	Candidate	FPv%	1	2	3	4	5
Conservative	Ron McKail (incumbent)	29.35%	1,163				
Liberal Democrats	Iris Margaret Walker	24.08%	954				
SNP	Amanda Allan (incumbent)	17.99%	713	780.1	813.0		
SNP	David Robert Aitchison	17.74%	703	735.5	749.8	766.6	974.2
Labour	Peter Young	10.83%	429	503.1	560.5	561.5	
Electorate: 10,882 Valid: 3,962 Spoilt: 32 Quota: 793 Turnout: 3,994 (36.41%)

=== Huntly, Strathbogie and Howe of Alford ===
- 2007: 2xLib Dem; 1xSNP; 1xCon
- 2012: 1xCon; 1xSNP; 1xLib Dem; 1xIndependent
- 2007-2012 Change: Independent gain from Lib Dem

Huntly, Strathbogie and Howe of Alford - 4 seats
Party	Candidate	FPv%	Count					
Party	Candidate	FPv%	1	2	3	4	5	6
Conservative	Moira Ingleby (incumbent)	26.47%	1,091					
SNP	Joanna Strathdee (incumbent)††††	20.14%	830					
Liberal Democrats	Alastair Ross (incumbent)†††††	18.24%	752	831.2				
SNP	Tom Murray	14.56%	600	620.2	620.97	624.8	683.8	
Independent	John Latham	14.39%	593	650.8	653.2	653.4	760.6	995.9
Green	Jake Williams	6.21%	256	274.3	275.6	275.9		
Electorate: 11,265 Valid: 4,122 Spoilt: 48 Quota: 825 Turnout: 4,170 (36.59%)

=== Aboyne, Upper Deeside and Donside ===
- 2007: 2xCon; 1xLib Dem
- 2012: 1xCon; 1xSNP; 1xLib Dem
- 2007-2012 Change: SNP gain one seat from Con

Aboyne, Upper Deeside and Donside - 3 seats
Party	Candidate	FPv%	Count				
Party	Candidate	FPv%	1	2	3	4	5
Conservative	Katrina Farquhar	34.62%	1,332				
SNP	Geva Blackett	28.36%	1,091				
Liberal Democrats	Peter Argyle (incumbent)	16.64%	640	756.9	780.7	852.7	1,443.3
Liberal Democrats	Rosemary Bruce (incumbent)	14.11%	543	629.1	649.8	734.7	
Labour	Beverly Cochran	5.48%	241	267.1	294.4		
Electorate: 8,597 Valid: 3,847 Spoilt: 39 Quota: 962 Turnout: 3,876 (44.75%)

=== Banchory and Mid-Deeside ===
- 2007: 1xCon; 1xSNP; 1xLib Dem
- 2012: 1xCon; 1xSNP; 1xLib Dem
- 2007-2012 Change: No change

Banchory and Mid-Deeside - 3 seats
Party	Candidate	FPv%	Count	
Party	Candidate	FPv%	1	2
Conservative	Jill Webster (incumbent)	36.0	1,185	
SNP	Linda Clark (incumbent)	29.1	956	
Liberal Democrats	Karen Clark (incumbent)	23.0	757	952.8
Labour	Lesley Young	8.4	278	
Green	Matt Wickham	3.5	114	
Electorate: 8,296 Valid: 3,290 Spoilt: 19 Quota: 823 Turnout: 3,309 (39.66%)

=== North Kincardine ===
- 2007: 2xLib Dem; 1xSNP; 1xCon
- 2012: 1xSNP; 1xLab; 1xCon; 1xLib Dem
- 2007-2012 Change: Lab gain one seat from Lib Dem

North Kincardine - 4 seats
Party	Candidate	FPv%	Count					
Party	Candidate	FPv%	1	2	3	4	5	6
SNP	Alastair Bews (incumbent)	24.94%	988					
Labour	Alison Evison	21.53%	853					
Conservative	Carl Nelson (incumbent)	19.74%	782	785.7	790.3	812.7		
Liberal Democrats	Ian Mollison (incumbent)	11.71%	464	466.8	472.8	478.1	484.7	833.2
Liberal Democrats	Paul Melling (incumbent)	10.48%	415	423.1	434.9	437.4	441.7	
SNP	Alan Inglis	10.43%	413	585.3	598.4	607.4	609.1	644.7
Scottish Christian	Tom Morrow	1.16%	46	46.8	49.6			
Electorate: 10,563 Valid: 3,961 Spoilt: 36 Quota: 793 Turnout: 3,997 (37.50%)

=== Stonehaven and Lower Deeside ===
- 2007: 2xLib Dem; 1xCon; 1xSNP
- 2012: 1xCon; 1xSNP; 1xLab; 1xLib Dem
- 2007-2012 Change: Lab gain one seat from Lib Dem

Stonehaven and Lower Deeside - 4 seats
Party	Candidate	FPv%	Count								
Party	Candidate	FPv%	1	2	3	4	5	6	7	8	9
Conservative	Wendy Agnew (incumbent)	27.0	1,111								
SNP	Graeme Clark (incumbent)	16.2	667	684.2	713.0	741.3	762.3	1052.7			
Labour	Raymond Christie	9.8	404	414.8	427.8	463.4	486.6	501.9	530.6	590.8	617.8
Liberal Democrats	Peter Bellarby (incumbent)	8.6	354	380.3	398.8	433.8	617.7	633.9	660.9	735.0	860.6
SNP	Robert Fergusson	7.5	311	314.9	335.4	353.1	371.7				
Conservative	Jeff Hutchison	6.7	278	404.9	426.5	438.0	458.9	462.9	474.3	526.8	
Liberal Democrats	David Fleming	6.7	275	297.9	319.5	347.5					
Green	Rachel Shanks	6.2	255	263.5	286.8						
Independent	Bob Michie	5.8	241	258.2	321.1	378.2	411.1	425.0	462.8		
Independent	Douglas Samways	5.4	224	243							
Electorate: 10,701 Valid: 4,120 Spoilt: 47 Quota: 825 Turnout: 4,167 (38.50%)

=== Mearns ===
- 2007: 2xLib Dem; 1xSNP; 1xCon
- 2012: 1xCon; 1xSNP; 1xLib Dem; 1xIndependent
- 2007-2012 Change: Independent gain from Lib Dem

Mearns - 4 seats
Party	Candidate	FPv%	Count						
Party	Candidate	FPv%	1	2	3	4	5	6	7
Conservative	George Carr (incumbent)	20.73%	868						
SNP	Jean Dick (incumbent)	20.70%	867						
Liberal Democrats	Bill Howatson (incumbent)	20.03%	839						
SNP	Robert Forbes	10.91%	457	458.3	482.2	482.4	564.1	595.9	
Independent	Dave Stewart	10.29%	431	433.2	434.5	434.7	530.9	684.8	890.5
Conservative	David Nelson	8.93%	374	394.1	395.1	395.3	423.8		
Labour	Gill Bayfield	8.40%	352	353.2	354.5	354.7			
Electorate: 10,963 Valid: 4,188 Spoilt: 35 Quota: 838 Turnout: 4,223 (38.20%)

== Aftermath ==
As no single party group on the council had the required 35 seats for an overall majority, a Conservative-Lib Dem-Independent administration was formed. In 2013, the 2 Labour councillors joined the administration. However, on 8 June 2015, a new administration was formed by the SNP, Scottish Labour and 2 Progressive Independent councillors, who had been members of the previous administration.

East Garioch Cllr Fergus Hood defected from the SNP and joined the Liberal Democrats on 3 May 2013.

West Garioch Cllr Sheena Lonchay and Inverurie and District Cllr Martin Kitts-Hayes both defected from the Liberal Democrats and became Independents on 25 April 2014.

Troup Independent Cllr Mark Findlater ceased to be an independent and joined the Conservatives on 23 February 2016.

Troup SNP Cllr Hamish Partridge resigned from the party on 17 June 2016 and became an independent citing curtailments to his freedom of speech.

Banff and District SNP Cllr John Cox resigned from the party and became an independent on 20 February 2017.

=== By-elections ===
==== Troup by-election ====
On 27 November 2014 a by-election was held after the death of Conservative councillor John Duncan on 4 September 2014. The SNP candidate Ross Cassie gained the seat from the Conservatives.

Troup By-election (27 November 2014) - 1 Seat
Party	Candidate	FPv%	Count					
Party	Candidate	FPv%	1	2	3	4	5	6
SNP	Ross Cassie	46.1%	1,159	1,162	1,183	1,205	1,244	1,352
Conservative	Iain Taylor	22.8%	574	580	588	604	645	718
Independent	Alan Still	15.5%	391	408	415	423	446	
Liberal Democrats	Ann Bell	5.6%	141	141	149	180		
Labour	Alan Duffill	5.6%	140	142	148			
Green	Darren Duncan	2.7%	68	69				
Independent	Philip Mitchell	1.7%	43					
Valid: 2,516 Quota: 1,259 Turnout: (32.39%)

==== Huntly, Strathbogie and Howe of Alford by-election ====
On 5 November 2015 a by-election was held after the death of SNP councillor Joanne Strathdee on 23 August 2015, and the resignation of Liberal Democrat councillor Alastair Ross on 1 September 2015. It was won by both Conservative candidate Margo Stewart, gaining a seat for her party, and SNP candidate Gwyneth Petrie, who held the seat for her party.

Huntly, Strathbogie and Howe of Alford By-election (5 November 2015) - 2 Seats
Party	Candidate	FPv%	Count
Party	Candidate	FPv%	1
Conservative	Margo Stewart	36.3%	1,469
SNP	Gwyneth Petrie	35.4%	1,433
Liberal Democrats	David Millican	22.9%	928
Labour	Sarah Flavell	4.8%	196
Scottish Libertarian	Derek Scott	0.5%	20
Valid: 4,046 Spoilt: 50 Quota: 1,349 Turnout: 4,096 (34.5%)

==== Banff by-election ====
On 3 November 2016 a by-election was held after the death of SNP councillor Ian Gray on 27 August 2016. It was won by the Conservative candidate Iain Taylor, gaining the seat for his party.

Banff and District By-election (3 November 2016) - 1 Seat
Party	Candidate	FPv%	Count	
Party	Candidate	FPv%	1	2
Conservative	Iain Taylor	44.0	1,170	1,378
SNP	Glen Reynolds	36.2	962	1,097
Liberal Democrats	Alistair Mason	19.8	526	
Conservative gain from SNP				
Valid: 2,658 Spoilt: 26 Quota: 1,330 Turnout: 2,684

==== Inverurie and District by-election ====
On 3 November 2016 a by-election was held after the resignation of Liberal Democrat councillor Martin Kitts-Hayes. It was won by Conservative candidate Colin Clark, gaining the seat for his party.

Inverurie and District By-election (3 November 2016) - 1 Seat
Party	Candidate	FPv%	Count		
Party	Candidate	FPv%	1	2	3
Conservative	Colin Clark	38.8	1,302	1,319	1,701
SNP	Neil Baillie	34.6	1,164	1,192	1,341
Liberal Democrats	Alison Auld	22.5	755	795	
Labour	Sarah Flavell	4.1	139		
Conservative gain from Liberal Democrats					
Valid: 3,360 Spoilt: 18 Quota: 1,681 Turnout: 3,378
