= Aberdeenshire East =

Constituency of the Scottish Parliament

- County constituency for the Scottish Parliament
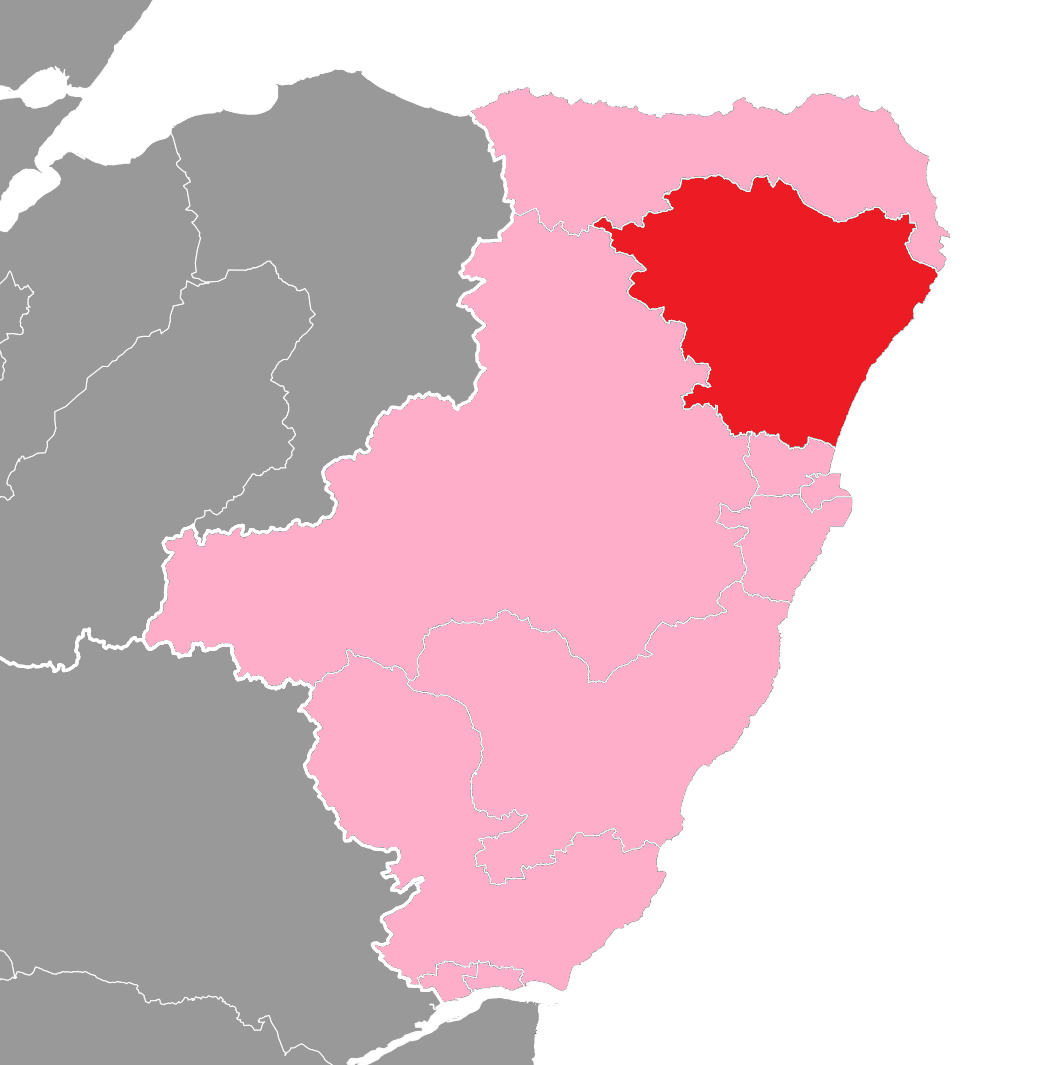

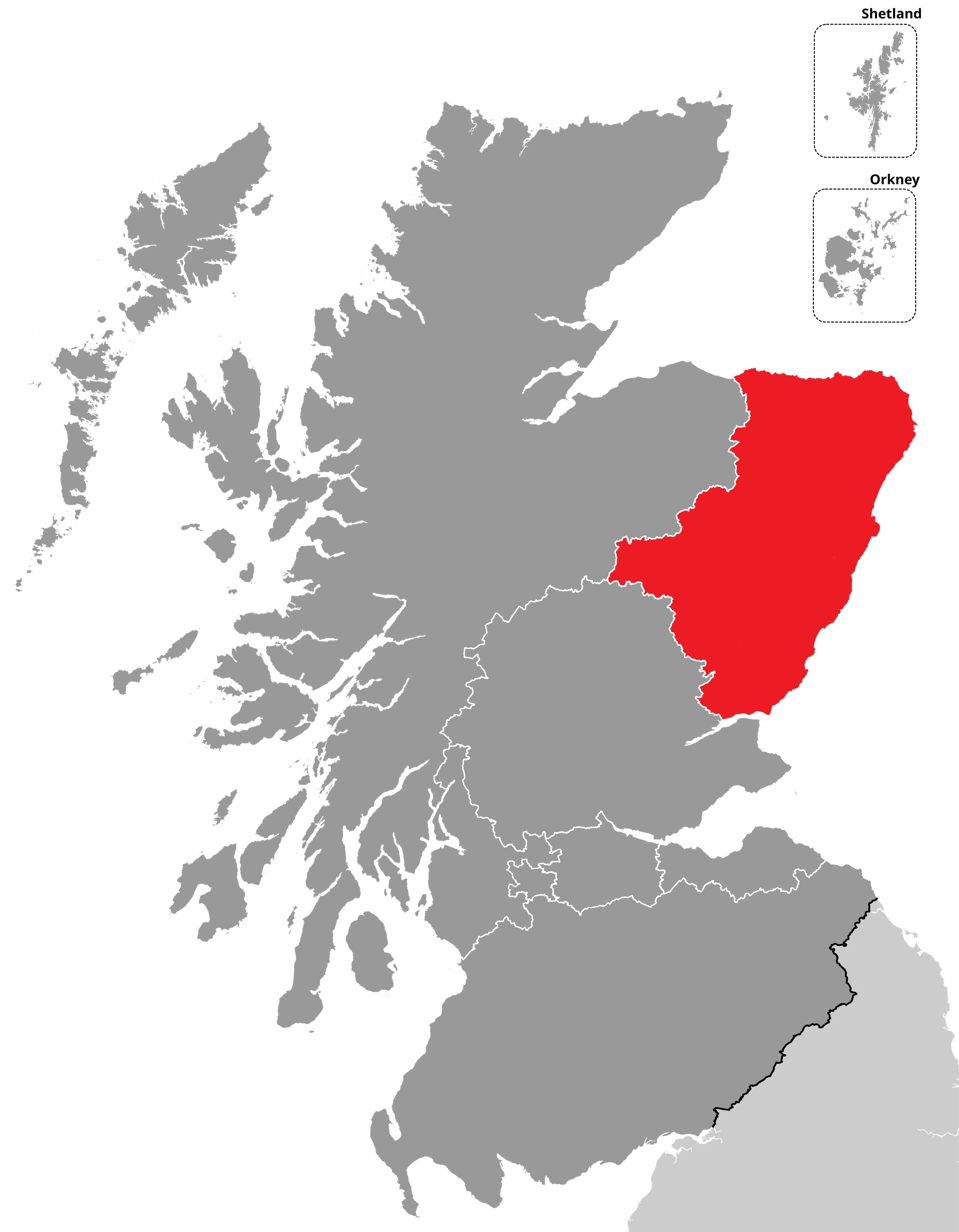
- Aberdeenshire East shown within the North East Scotland electoral region and the region shown within Scotland
- Electoral region: North East Scotland
- Electorate: 62,556 (2026)

Current constituency
- Created: 2011
- Party: Scottish National Party
- MSP: Gillian Martin
- Council area: Aberdeenshire
- Created from: Banff and Buchan, Gordon

Aberdeenshire East (Gaelic: Siorrachd Obar Dheathain an Ear) is a county constituency of the Scottish Parliament covering part of the council area of Aberdeenshire. Under the additional-member electoral system used for elections to the Scottish Parliament, it elects one Member of the Scottish Parliament (MSP) by the first past the post method of election. It is also one of ten constituencies in the North East Scotland electoral region, which elects seven additional members, in addition to the ten constituency MSPs, to produce a form of proportional representation for the region as a whole.

The seat was created at the first periodic review of Scottish Parliament boundaries ahead of the 2011 Scottish Parliament election, and largely consists of areas that were in the former constituency of Gordon. It has been held by Gillian Martin of the Scottish National Party since the 2016 Scottish Parliament election.

== Electoral region ==
The other nine constituencies of the North East Scotland region are: Aberdeen Central, Aberdeen Deeside and North Kincardine, Aberdeen Donside, Aberdeenshire West, Angus North and Mearns, Angus South, Banffshire and Buchan Coast, Dundee City East and Dundee City West. The region covers all of the Aberdeen City council area, the Aberdeenshire council area, the Angus council area, the Dundee City council area and part of the Moray council area.

== Constituency boundaries and council area ==
2011-2025 Boundaries

Aberdeenshire is represented by four constituencies in the Scottish Parliament: Aberdeenshire East, Aberdeenshire West, Angus North and Mearns and Banffshire and Buchan Coast.

Aberdeenshire East was created at the first periodic review of Scottish Parliament boundaries ahead of the 2011 Scottish Parliament election, and largely consists of areas that were in the former constituency of Gordon. The boundaries of the seat were slightly amended at the second periodic review of Scottish Parliament boundaries in 2025, with minor changes in the boundary with the Banffshire and Buchan Coast constituency in the area around the villages of Maud and Mintlaw. These changes were implemented by Boundaries Scotland in order to address the variation from the electoral quota for these two constituencies, and to recognise community ties in this area. At this review, the following wards of Aberdeenshire Council were used to redefine the seat:

- Central Buchan (shared with Banffshire and Buchan Coast)
- Turriff and District (entire ward)
- Mid-Formartine (entire ward)
- Ellon and District (entire ward)
- Inverurie and District (entire ward)
- Peterhead South and Cruden (shared with Banffshire and Buchan Coast)
- East Garioch (shared with Aberdeenshire West)

== Member of the Scottish Parliament ==
First contested in the 2011 election, the seat was won by Alex Salmond, who was then First Minister, and had previously held the Gordon seat, from which Aberdeenshire East was largely formed. Salmond had also previously been MSP for Banff and Buchan from 1999 until resigning in 2001, as well as representing the Westminster seat of Banff and Buchan from 1987 until retiring from the British Parliament in 2010. He later served again in the UK Parliament as MP for Gordon from 2015 to 2017.

Election	Member	Party
2011	Alex Salmond	SNP
2016	Gillian Martin	SNP

== Election results ==
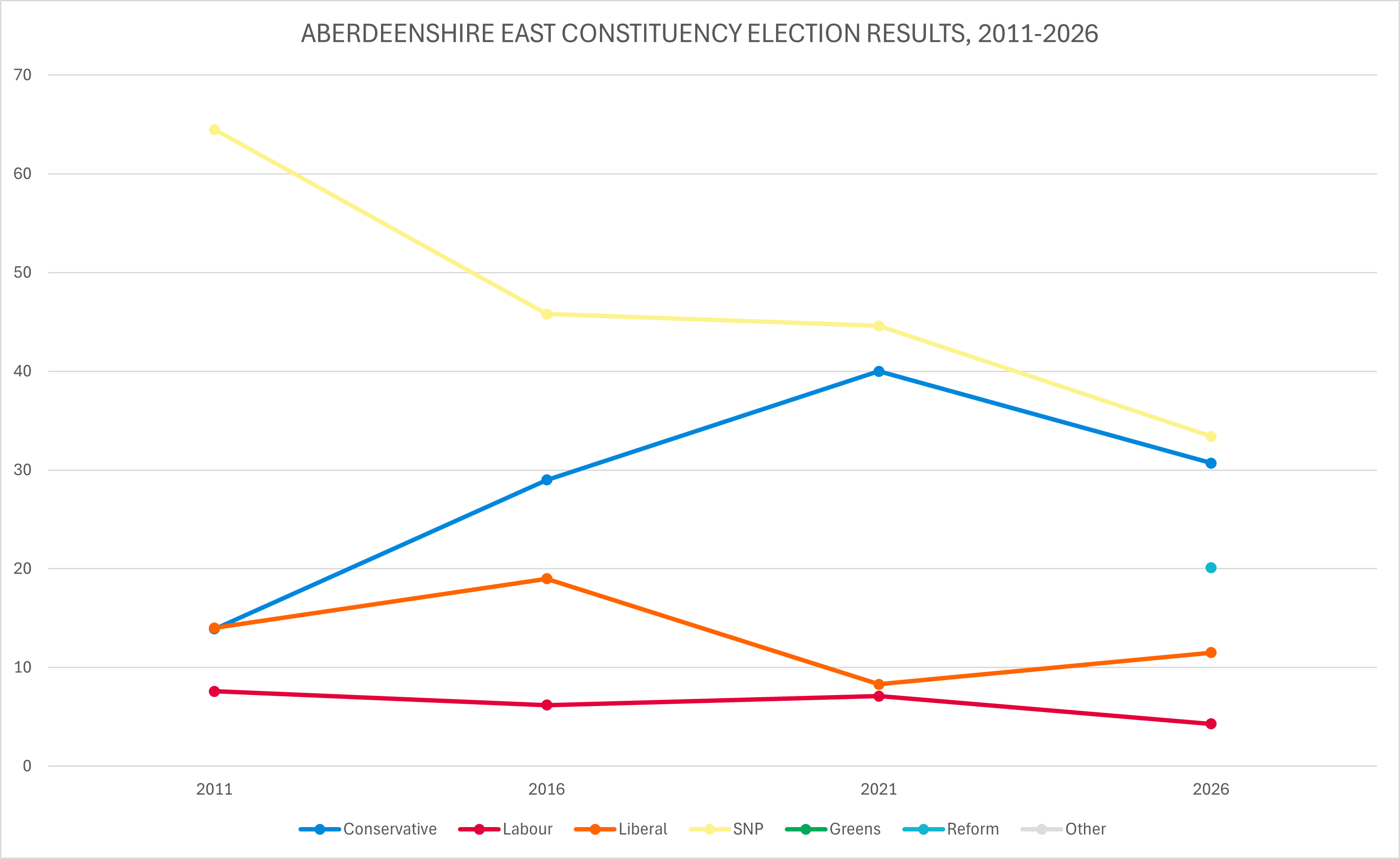
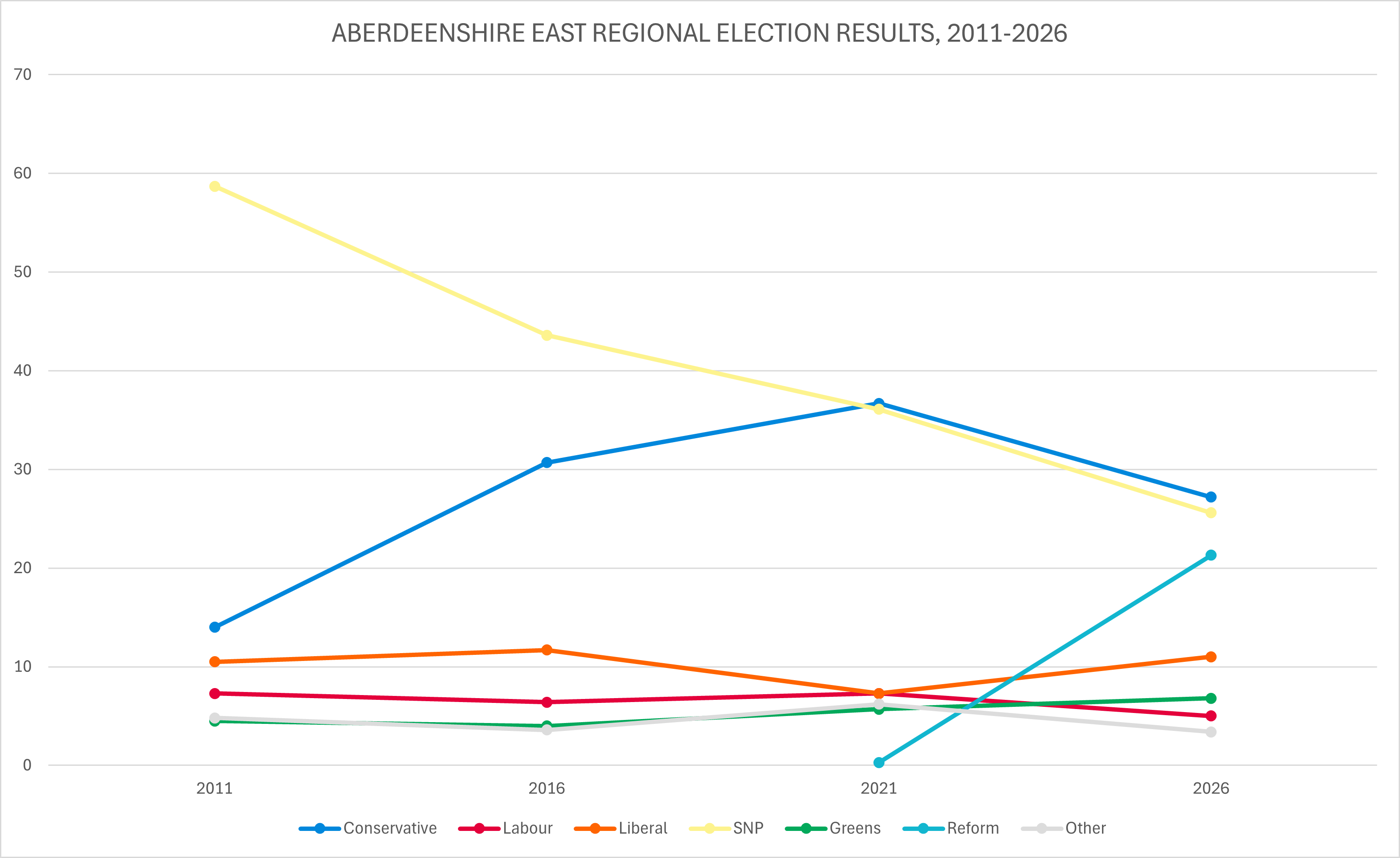

=== 2020s ===
2026 Scottish Parliament election: Aberdeenshire East
Party	Candidate	Constituency			Regional		
Party	Candidate	Votes	%	±%	Votes	%	±%
SNP	Gillian Martin (Note: Incumbent member for this constituency)	11,624	33.4	▼11.3	8,928	25.6	▼10.5
Conservative	Douglas Lumsden (Note: Incumbent member on the party list, or for another constituency)	10,681	30.7	▼9.1	9,490	27.2	▼9.5
Reform	John Crawley	7,008	20.1	New	7,410	21.3	▲21.0
Liberal Democrats	David Evans	3,999	11.5	▲3.1	3,833	11.0	▲3.7
Green					2,364	6.8	▲1.1
Labour	Janine Langler	1,487	4.3	▼2.7	1,742	5.0	▼2.3
Scottish Family					256	0.7	Steady
AtLS					209	0.6	New
Independent Green Voice					190	0.6	▲0.1
ISP					169	0.5	New
Independent	Marie Boulton				82	0.2	New
Advance UK					66	0.2	New
Workers Party					51	0.2	New
Scottish Socialist					46	0.3	New
Independent	Iris Leask				26	0.1	New
Majority		943	2.7	▼1.9			
Valid votes		34,799			34,862		
Invalid votes		96			60		
Turnout		34,895	55.8	▼8.5	34,922	55.8	▼8.5
SNP hold		Swing					
Notes

2021 Scottish Parliament election: Aberdeenshire East
Party	Candidate	Constituency			Regional		
Party	Candidate	Votes	%	±%	Votes	%	±%
SNP	Gillian Martin (Note: Incumbent member for this constituency)	18,307	44.6	▼1.2	14,873	36.1	▼7.4
Conservative	Stewart Whyte	16,418	40.0	▲11.0	15,112	36.7	▲6.0
Liberal Democrats	Conrad Wood	3,396	8.3	▼10.7	3,007	7.3	▼4.4
Labour	Graeme Downie	2,900	7.1	▲0.9	3,092	7.3	▲1.1
Green					2,326	5.7	▲1.6
Alba					1,235	3.0	New
Scottish Family					301	0.7	New
All for Unity					284	0.7	New
Independent Green Voice					218	0.5	New
Abolish the Scottish Parliament					151	0.4	New
Reform					103	0.3	New
Freedom Alliance (UK)					101	0.3	New
Scottish Libertarian					75	0.2	▼0.1
Restore Scotland					70	0.2	New
UKIP					52	0.1	▼1.9
Independent	Laura Marshall				45	0.1	New
Independent	Geoffrey Farquharson				18	0.0	New
Renew					9	0.0	New
Majority		1,889	4.6	▼12.2			
Valid votes		41,021			41,072		
Invalid votes		134			103		
Turnout		41,155	64.3	▲9.8	41,175	64.3	▲8.7
SNP hold		Swing		▼6.1			
Notes

This was the largest Conservative vote share increase at the 2021 Scottish Parliament election.

=== 2010s ===
2016 Scottish Parliament election: Aberdeenshire East
Party	Candidate	Constituency			Regional		
Party	Candidate	Votes	%	±%	Votes	%	±%
SNP	Gillian Martin	15,912	45.8	▼18.7	15,204	43.6	▼15.1
Conservative	Colin Clark	10,075	29.0	▲15.1	10,706	30.7	▲16.7
Liberal Democrats	Christine Jardine	6,611	19.0	▲5.0	4,079	11.7	▲1.2
Labour	Sarah Flavell	2,155	6.2	▼1.4	2,244	6.4	▼0.9
Green					1,410	4.0	▼0.5
UKIP					720	2.1	▲1.2
Scottish Christian					214	0.6	0.0
Scottish Libertarian					84	0.2	New
National Front					65	0.2	0.0
Communist					58	0.2	New
Solidarity					58	0.2	▲0.1
RISE					39	0.1	New
Majority		5,837	16.8	▼33.7			
Valid votes		34,753			34,881		
Invalid votes		107			39		
Turnout		34,860	55.5	▲2.8	34,920	55.6	▲2.9
SNP hold		Swing		▼16.9			

2011 Scottish Parliament election: Aberdeenshire East
Party	Candidate	Constituency			Region		
Party	Candidate	Votes	%	±%	Votes	%	±%
SNP	Alex Salmond (Note: Incumbent member on the party list, or for another constituency)	19,533	64.5	N/A	17,795	58.7	N/A
Liberal Democrats	Alison McInnes	4,238	14.0	N/A	3,169	10.5	N/A
Conservative	Geordie Stuart	4,211	13.9	N/A	4,225	14.0	N/A
Labour	Peter Smyth	2,304	7.6	N/A	2,209	7.3	N/A
Green					1,374	4.5	N/A
All-Scotland Pensioners Party					407	1.3	N/A
Scottish Christian					192	0.6	N/A
UKIP					263	0.8	N/A
Socialist Labour					101	0.3	N/A
BNP					235	0.8	N/A
Scottish Socialist					84	0.3	N/A
National Front					62	0.2	N/A
Solidarity					12	0.0	N/A
Angus Independents					5	0.0	N/A
Independent	John Cox				124	0.4	N/A
Independent	David Henderson				28	0.1	N/A
Independent	Andrew McBride				12	0.0	N/A
Majority		15,295	50.5	N/A			
Valid votes		30,286			30,297		
Invalid votes		81			77		
Turnout		30,367	52.7	N/A	30,374	52.7	N/A
SNP win (new seat)							

== See also ==
- East Aberdeenshire (UK Parliament constituency)

Preceded by Gordon	Constituency represented by the First Minister; 2011 – 2014	Succeeded by Glasgow Southside
