= Banffshire and Buchan Coast =

Constituency of the Scottish Parliament

- County constituency for the Scottish Parliament
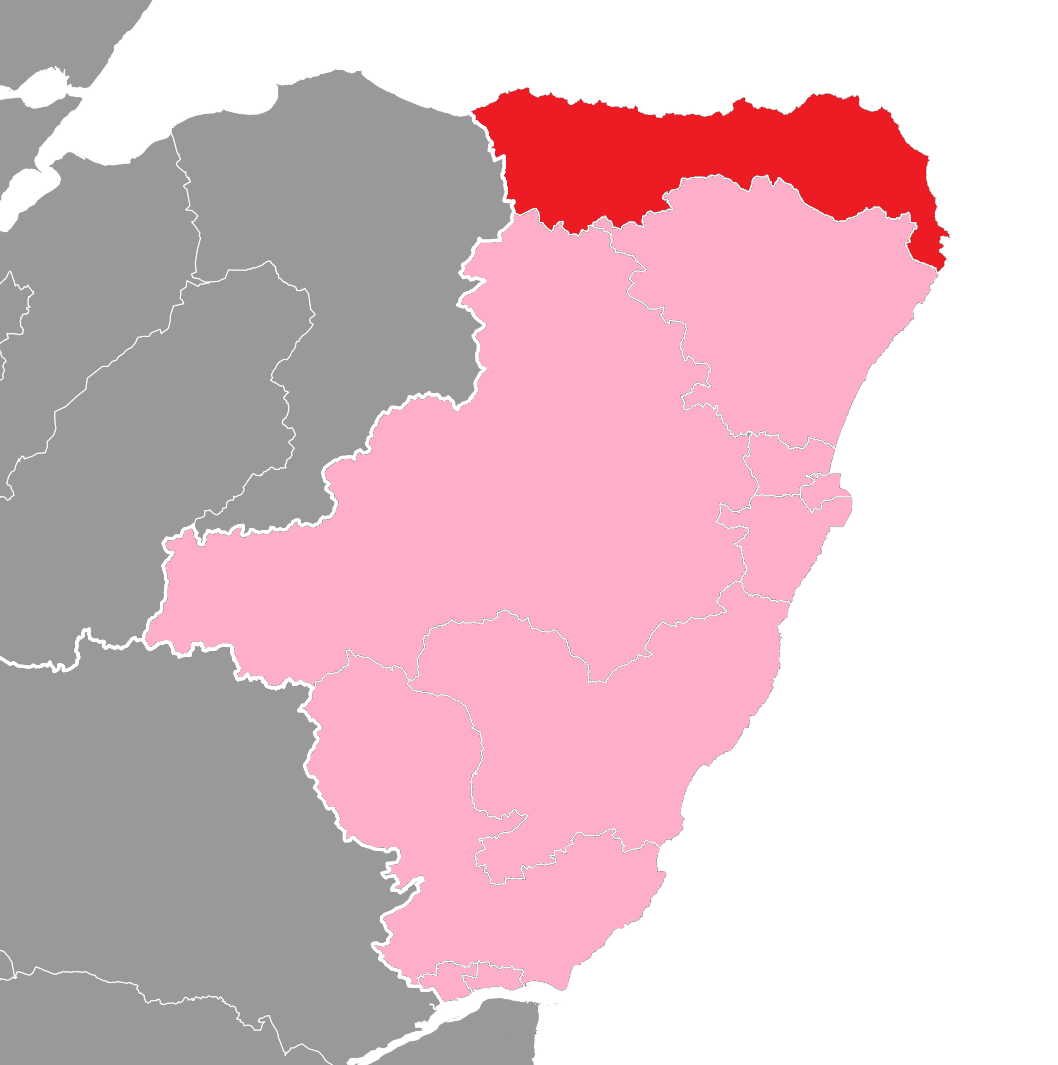

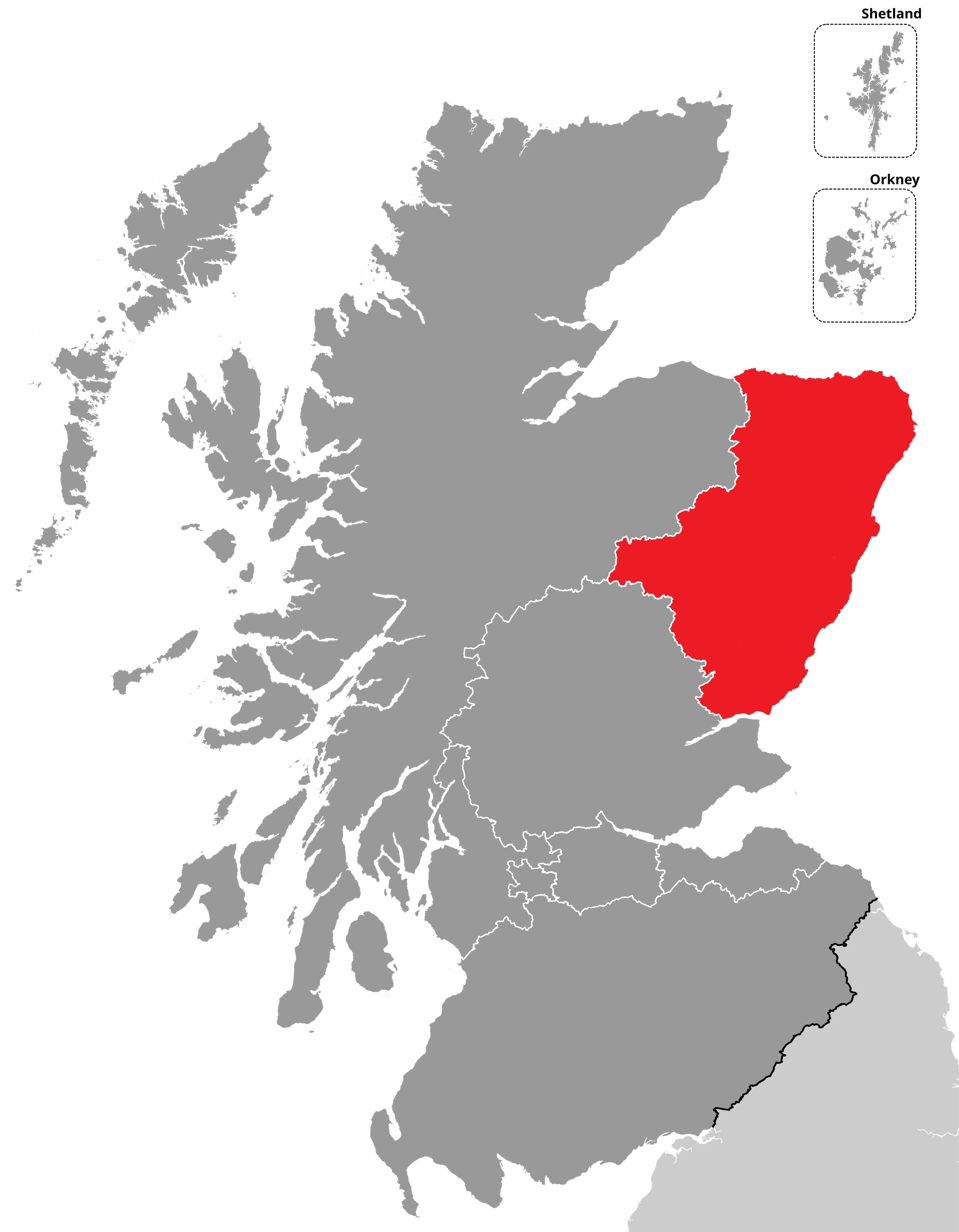
- Banffshire and Buchan Coast shown within the North East Scotland electoral region and the region shown within Scotland
- Electoral region: North East Scotland
- Electorate: 61,536 (2026)

Current constituency
- Created: 2011
- Party: SNP
- MSP: Karen Adam
- Council area: Aberdeenshire; Moray
- Created from: Banff and Buchan, Moray

Banffshire and Buchan Coast (Gaelic: Siorrachd Bhanbh agus Oirthir Bhùchainn) is a county constituency of the Scottish Parliament covering parts of the council areas of Aberdeenshire and Moray. It elects one Member of the Scottish Parliament (MSP) by the first past the post method of election. Under the additional-member electoral system used for elections to the Scottish Parliament, Banffshire and Buchan Coast is also one of ten constituencies in the North East Scotland electoral region, which elects seven additional members in addition to the ten constituency MSPs, producing a form of proportional representation for the region as a whole. The seat was created for the 2011 Scottish Parliament election.

It has been held by Karen Adam of the Scottish National Party since the 2021 Scottish Parliament election.

== Electoral region ==
The other nine constituencies of the North East Scotland region are: Aberdeen Central, Aberdeen Deeside and North Kincardine, Aberdeen Donside, Aberdeenshire East, Aberdeenshire West, Angus North and Mearns, Angus South, Dundee City East and Dundee City West. The region covers all of the Aberdeen City council area, the Aberdeenshire council area, the Angus council area, the Dundee City council area and part of the Moray council area.

== Constituency boundaries and council area ==
Map of boundaries from 2011 to 2025 review

The constituency covers parts of both Aberdeenshire and Moray. It is one of the five constituencies covering Aberdeenshire in the Scottish Parliament, alongside Aberdeenshire East, Aberdeenshire West, Aberdeen Deeside and North Kincardine, and Angus North and Mearns. The rest of Moray is represented by the Moray constituency.

The seat was created following the first periodic review of Scottish Parliament boundaries in 2011, and was first contested at the 2011 Scottish Parliament election. It largely replaced the seat of Banff and Buchan which was abolished, and also includes areas that were formerly in the Gordon and Moray constituencies. At the second periodic review of Scottish Parliament boundaries in 2025 the seat was altered to include the northern part of the central buchan ward. This change led to an addition of 10 electors to the constituency compared to the previous boundaries.

The constituency comprises the following wards of Aberdeenshire Council and Moray Council:

- Aberdeenshire:
  - Banff and District (entire ward)
  - Troup (entire ward)
  - Fraserburgh and District (entire ward)
  - Peterhead North and Rattray (entire ward)
  - Central Buchan (shared with Aberdeenshire East)
  - Peterhead South and Cruden (shared with Aberdeenshire East)
- Moray:
  - Keith and Cullen (shared with Moray)
  - Buckie (entire ward)

== Member of the Scottish Parliament ==
Election	Member	Party
2011	Stewart Stevenson	SNP
2021	Karen Adam	SNP

== Election results ==
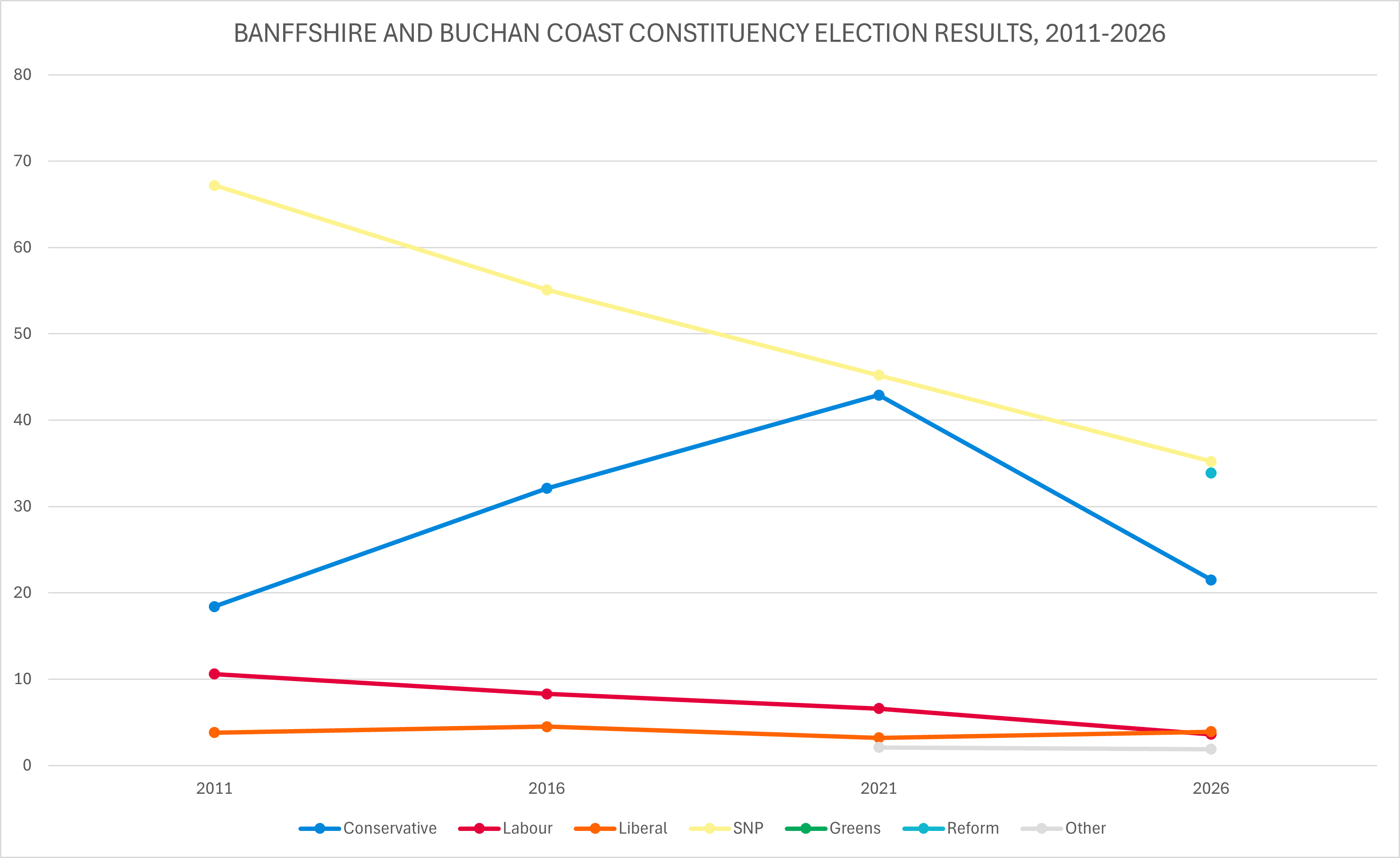
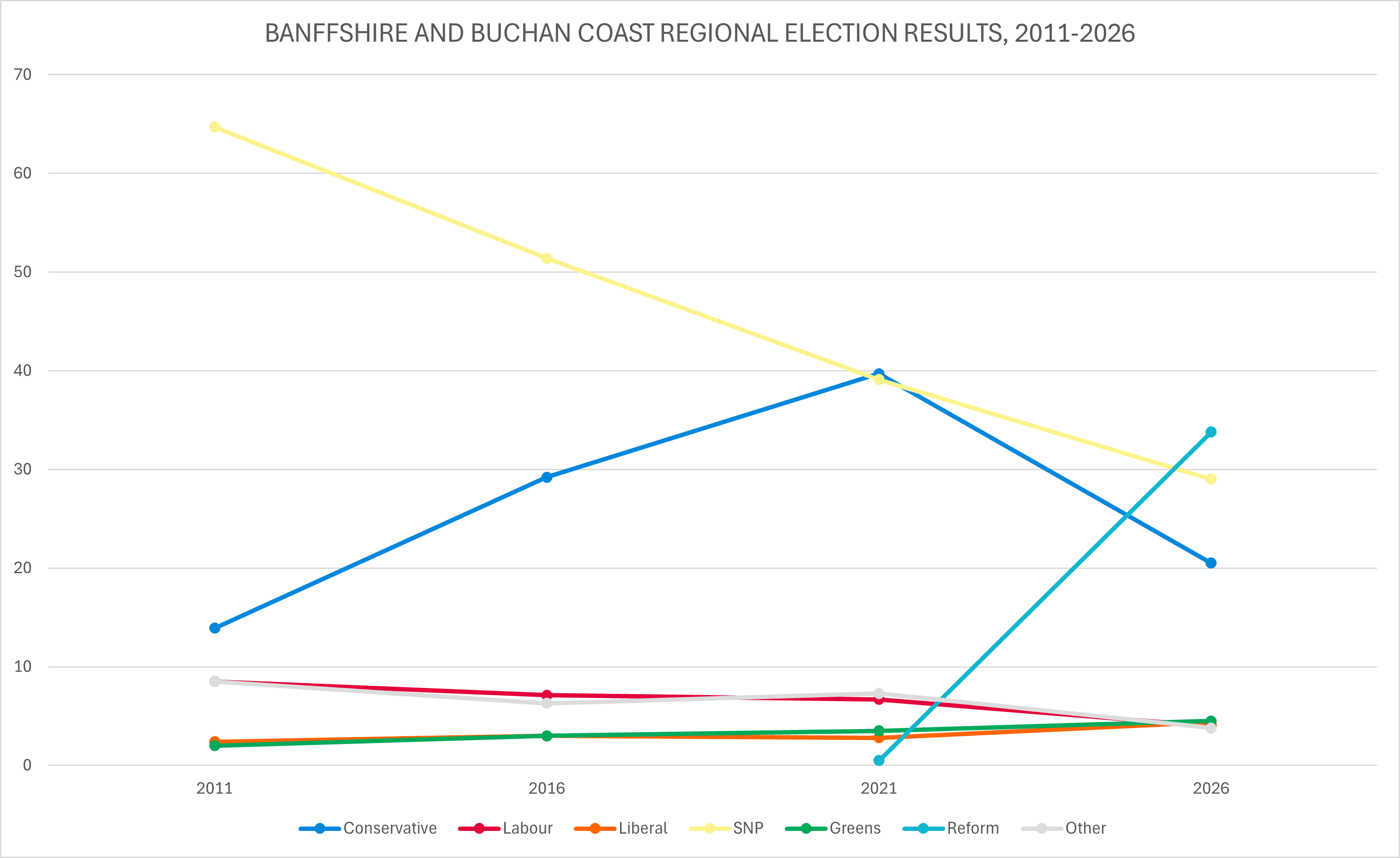

=== 2020s ===
2026 Scottish Parliament election: Banffshire and Buchan Coast
Party	Candidate	Constituency			Regional		
Party	Candidate	Votes	%	±%	Votes	%	±%
SNP	Karen Adam (Note: Incumbent member for this constituency)	10,374	35.2	▼9.9	8,581	29.0	▼10.1
Reform	Conrad Ritchie	10,010	33.9	New	9,989	33.8	▲33.3
Conservative	James Adams	6,348	21.5	▼21.5	6,063	20.5	▼19.2
Green					1,334	4.5	▲1.0
Liberal Democrats	Leslie Tarr	1,162	3.9	▲0.5	1,288	4.4	▲1.6
Labour	Brooke Ritchie	1,049	3.6	▼3.0	1,189	4.0	▼2.7
Independent	N D R McLellan	555	1.9	New			
Scottish Family					278	0.9	Steady
ISP					213	0.7	New
AtLS					193	0.7	New
Independent Green Voice					158	0.5	Steady
Independent	Marie Boulton				80	0.3	New
Advance UK					68	0.2	New
Workers Party					53	0.2	New
Scottish Socialist					44	0.2	New
Independent	Iris Leask				33	0.1	New
Majority		364	1.2	▼1.1			
Valid votes		29,498			29,564		
Invalid votes		76			63		
Turnout		29,574	48.1	▼8.1	29,627	48.2	▼8.0
SNP hold		Swing					
Notes

2021 Scottish Parliament election: Banffshire and Buchan Coast
Party	Candidate	Constituency			Regional		
Party	Candidate	Votes	%	±%	Votes	%	±%
SNP	Karen Adam	14,920	45.2	▼9.9	12,919	39.1	▼12.3
Conservative	Mark Findlater	14,148	42.9	▲10.8	13,130	39.7	▲10.5
Labour	Georgia Strachan	2,169	6.6	▼1.7	2,225	6.7	▼0.4
Green					1,167	3.5	▲0.5
Alba					1,135	3.4	New
Liberal Democrats	Alison Simpson	1,071	3.2	▼1.3	924	2.8	▼0.2
Scottish Family					286	0.9	New
All for Unity					231	0.7	New
Freedom Alliance (UK)	Jason Duncan	347	1.1	New	189	0.6	New
Reform					170	0.5	New
Independent Green Voice					147	0.4	New
Restore Scotland	David McHutchon	331	1.0	New	145	0.4	New
Abolish the Scottish Parliament					139	0.4	New
UKIP					86	0.3	▼3.5
Scottish Libertarian					47	0.1	0.0
Independent	Laura Marshall				35	0.1	New
Independent	Geoffrey Farquharson				12	0.0	New
Renew					12	0.0	New
Majority		772	2.3	▼20.7			
Valid votes		32,986			32,999		
Invalid votes		89			74		
Turnout		33,075	56.2	▲7.5	33,073	56.2	▲7.4
SNP hold		Swing		▼10.4			

=== 2010s ===
2016 Scottish Parliament election: Banffshire and Buchan Coast
Party	Candidate	Constituency			Regional		
Party	Candidate	Votes	%	±%	Votes	%	±%
SNP	Stewart Stevenson (Note: Incumbent member for this constituency)	15,802	55.1	▼12.1	14,809	51.4	▼13.3
Conservative	Peter Chapman	9,219	32.1	▲13.8	8,419	29.2	▲15.3
Labour	Nathan Morrison	2,372	8.3	▼2.3	2,052	7.1	▼1.4
UKIP					1,070	3.7	▲2.4
Liberal Democrats	David Evans	1,290	4.5	▲0.7	868	3.0	▲0.6
Green					858	3.0	▲1.0
Scottish Christian					429	1.5	▼0.2
Solidarity					113	0.4	▲0.3
National Front					57	0.2	▼0.1
Scottish Libertarian					52	0.2	New
Communist					50	0.2	New
RISE					31	0.1	New
Majority		6,583	23.0	▼29.8			
Valid votes		28,683			28,808		
Invalid votes		135			42		
Turnout		28,818	48.7	▲2.5	28,850	48.8	▲2.1
SNP hold		Swing		▼13.0			
Notes

2011 Scottish Parliament election: Banffshire and Buchan Coast
Party	Candidate	Constituency			Region		
Party	Candidate	Votes	%	±%	Votes	%	±%
SNP	Stewart Stevenson (Note: Incumbent member on the party list, or for another constituency)	16,812	67.2	N/A	16,185	64.7	N/A
Conservative	Michael Watt	4,592	18.4	N/A	3,482	13.9	N/A
Labour	Alan Duffill	2,642	10.6	N/A	2,115	8.5	N/A
Liberal Democrats	Galen Milne	958	3.8	N/A	606	2.4	N/A
Green					509	2.0	N/A
Scottish Christian					435	1.7	N/A
All-Scotland Pensioners Party					431	1.7	N/A
UKIP					331	1.3	N/A
BNP					269	1.1	N/A
Socialist Labour					116	0.5	N/A
Scottish Socialist					80	0.3	N/A
National Front					68	0.3	N/A
Solidarity					18	0.1	N/A
Angus Independents					6	0.0	N/A
Others					363	1.5	N/A
Majority		12,220	48.8	N/A			
Valid votes		25,004			25,014		
Invalid votes		95			83		
Turnout		25,099	46.17	N/A	25,097	46.7	N/A
SNP win (new seat)							
