= Michael Kidson =

British schoolmaster (1929–2015)

Michael George MacDonald Kidson (24 August 1929 – 20 June 2015) was a British schoolmaster who taught history at Eton College. Among Kidson's pupils was former Prime Minister David Cameron.

Kidson was born in Belgravia, London. His parents separated when he was an infant and his father died a few years later. He was brought up in Shropshire by his grandfather until the age of seven. Following his grandfather's death he was placed into the care of the Royal Wolverhampton School, which at that time was a charitable institution for children who had lost one or both parents.

After five months' training at the Mons Officer Cadet School, Kidson served in the King's Shropshire Light Infantry as a national service officer, then went up to Gonville and Caius College, Cambridge, where he read economics and history. In 1956, he joined Shell as a graduate trainee, but soon moved into teaching, initially at Papplewick, a private school in Ascot, and then at Eton. He retired in 1994.

Commenting on Kidson, David Cameron said: "If he caught you napping, he’d throw this block of wood at your head .... Health and safety means you can’t do this anymore."

Kidson's life is portrayed in the 2017 book by Jamie Blackett, The Enigma of Kidson: The Portrait of an Eton Schoolmaster, published by Quiller (ISBN 9781846892509).
