= Mid-Formartine (ward) =

- Aberdeenshire Council
- Boundary of Mid-Formartine in Aberdeenshire from 2017.
- Electorate: 11,612

Current ward
- Created: 2007
- Councillor: Jenny Nicol (SNP)
- Councillor: Paul Johnston (Independent)
- Councillor: Andrew Hassan (Liberal Democrats)
- Councillor: Derek Ritchie (Conservative)

Mid-Formartine is one of the nineteen wards used to elect members of the Aberdeenshire Council. It elects four Councillors. The ward's name refers to the region of Formartine, north of Aberdeen.

== Councillors ==
Election	Councillors			
2007	Allan Hendry (SNP)	Paul Johnston (Liberal Democrats; Independent)	John Kevin Loveday (Liberal Democrats) Cryle Shand (SNP)	Jim Gifford (Conservative)
2009	Allan Hendry (SNP)	Paul Johnston (Liberal Democrats; Independent)	John Kevin Loveday (Liberal Democrats) Cryle Shand (SNP)	Jim Gifford (Conservative)
2012	Allan Hendry (SNP)	Paul Johnston (Liberal Democrats; Independent)	John Kevin Loveday (Liberal Democrats) Cryle Shand (SNP)	Jim Gifford (Conservative)
2017	Karen Adam (SNP)	Paul Johnston (Liberal Democrats; Independent)	Andrew Hassan (Liberal Democrats)	Jim Gifford (Conservative)
2021	Sheila Powell (Conservative)	Paul Johnston (Liberal Democrats; Independent)	Andrew Hassan (Liberal Democrats)	Jim Gifford (Conservative)
2022	Jenny Nicol (SNP)	Paul Johnston (Liberal Democrats; Independent)	Andrew Hassan (Liberal Democrats)	Derek Ritchie (Conservative)

== Election results ==
=== 2022 election ===
Mid-Formartine − 4 seats
Party	Candidate	FPv%	Count				
Party	Candidate	FPv%	1	2	3	4	5
SNP	Jenny Nicol	19.2	971	1,597			
Independent	Paul Johnston (incumbent)	18.2	916	959	1,131		
Conservative	Derek Ritchie	17.4	876	879	897	910	1,648
Conservative	Sheila Powell (incumbent)	15.9	803	809	827	837	
Liberal Democrats	Andrew Hassan (incumbent)	14.9	752	782	934	1,000	1,048
SNP	Kenny Hutchison	14.4	728				
Electorate: 11,612 Valid: 5,046 Spoilt: 85 Quota: 1,010 Turnout: 44.2%

=== 2021 By-election ===
Mid-Formantine By-election (19 August 2021) - 1 Seat
Party	Candidate	FPv%	Count
Party	Candidate	FPv%	1
Conservative	Sheila Powell	45.7	1,480
SNP	Jenny Nicol	37.2	1,205
Liberal Democrats	Jeff Goodhall	12.7	412
Green	Peter Kennedy	4.4	144

=== 2017 Election ===
2017 Aberdeenshire Council election

Mid-Formartine - 4 seats
Party	Candidate	FPv%	Count						
Party	Candidate	FPv%	1	2	3	4	5	6	7
Conservative	Jim Gifford (incumbent)	34.61%	1,797						
Independent	Paul Johnston (incumbent)	20.61%	1,070						
SNP	Karen Adam	19.99%	1,038	1,057					
Liberal Democrats	Andrew Hassan	9.46%	491	724	731	731	860	930	1,227
Independent	Jeff Goodhall	4.79%	249	456	467	468	534	627	
SNP	Cryle Shand (incumbent)	5.82%	302	310	314	329	358		
Labour	Kirsten Muat	4.72%	245	301	303	303			
Electorate: TBC Valid: 5,192 Spoilt: 43 Quota: 1,039 Turnout: 46.1%

=== 2012 Election ===
2012 Aberdeenshire Council election

Mid-Formartine - 4 seats
Party	Candidate	FPv%	Count						
Party	Candidate	FPv%	1	2	3	4	5	6	7
SNP	Allan Hendry (incumbent)	29.12	1,293						
Independent	Paul Johnston (incumbent)	21.12	938						
Conservative	Jim Gifford (incumbent)	16.24	721	735.1	740.8	825.9	895.3		
Liberal Democrats	John Kevin Loveday (incumbent)	9.89	439	458.7	467.4	542.6	658.7	661.1	
Labour	Braden Davy	8.92	396	411.9	416.9	463.8			
Independent	Jeff Goodhall	8.11	360	371.6	387.1				
SNP	Cryle Shand	6.62	294	606.5	612.4	679.6	753.0	753.6	938.0
Electorate: 11,843 Valid: 4,441 Spoilt: 39 Quota: 889 Turnout: 4,480 (37.50%)

=== 2007 Election ===
2007 Aberdeenshire Council election

Mid-Formartine
Party	Candidate	FPv%	Count				
Party	Candidate	FPv%	1	2	3	4	5
SNP	Allan Hendry	33.6	2,035				
Liberal Democrats	Paul Johnston†††††	27.4	1,661				
Conservative	Jim Gifford	17.1	1,034	1,141	1,182	1,261	
Liberal Democrats	John Kevin Loveday	11.2	677	855	1,134	1,210	1,227
Labour	Steve Thomson	7.7	469	558	586	613	618
Independent	Howard Kershaw	3.1	188	290	306		
Electorate: - Valid: 6,064 Spoilt: 59 Quota: 1,213 Turnout: 55.91%

== By-election ==
Following the election of Karen Adam (SNP) to Holyrood at the 2021 Scottish Parliament election on 6 May and her subsequent resignation as Councillor for Mid-Formartine ward a by-election was called on Thursday, 19 August 2021.

=== 2021 By-election ===
Mid Formartine By-election 2021 - Aberdeenshire Council

Mid-Formartine - 1 seat
Party	Candidate	FPv%	Count		
Party	Candidate	FPv%	1	2	3
Conservative	Sheila Powell	45.66%	1,480	1,484	1,645
SNP	Jenny Nicol	37.18%	1,205	1,281	1,409
Liberal Democrats	Jeff Goodhall	12.71%	412	451	
Green	Peter Kennedy	4.44%	144		
Electorate: 11,670 Valid: 3,241 Spoilt: 16 Quota: 1,621 Turnout: 27.9%
