= 2021 Scottish Parliament election =

- 6 May 2021

All 129 seats to the Scottish Parliament 65 seats needed for a majority
- Opinion polls
- Registered: 4,280,785
- Turnout: Constituency – 63.5% ▲7.7pp Regional – 63.5% ▲7.7pp
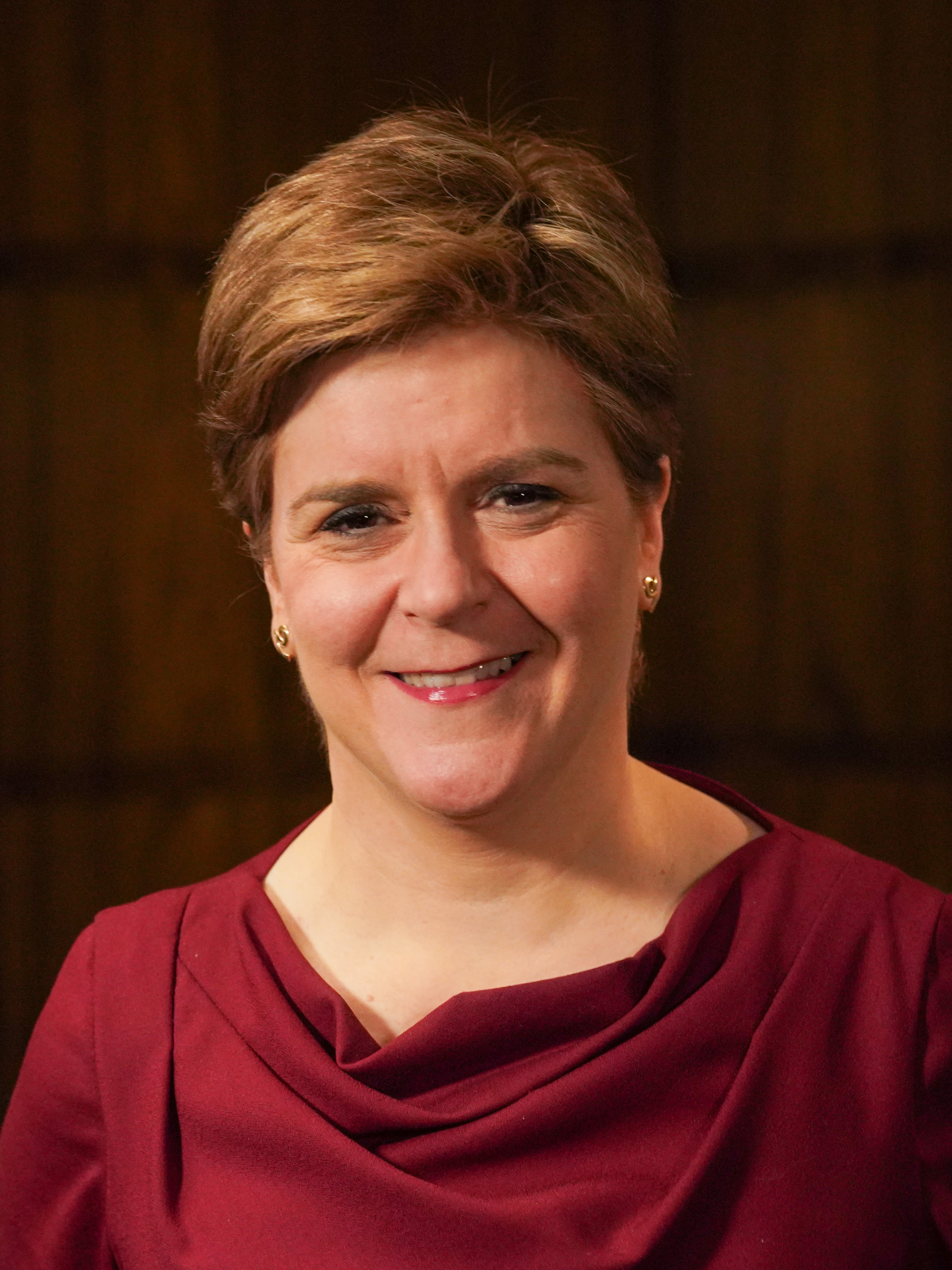

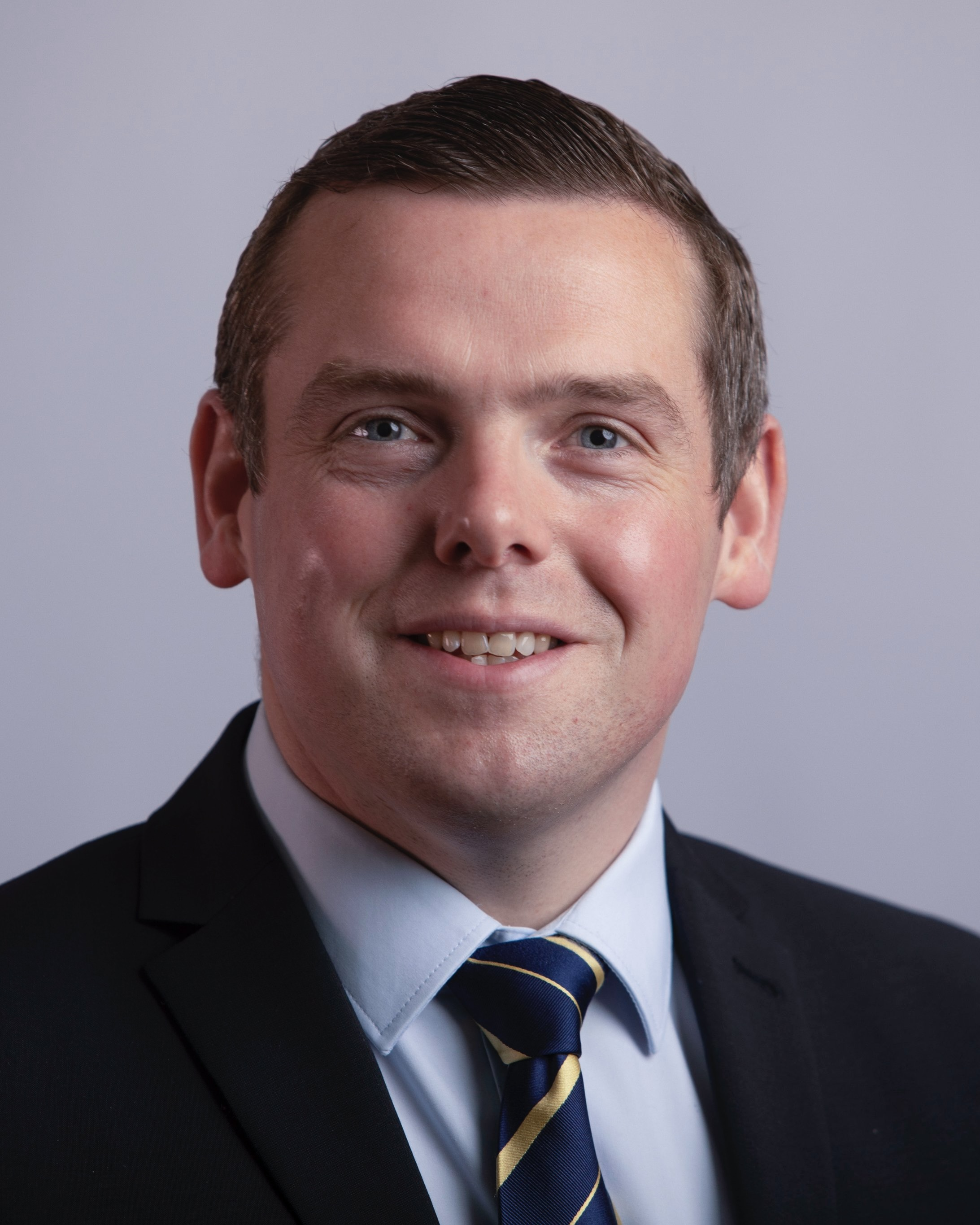

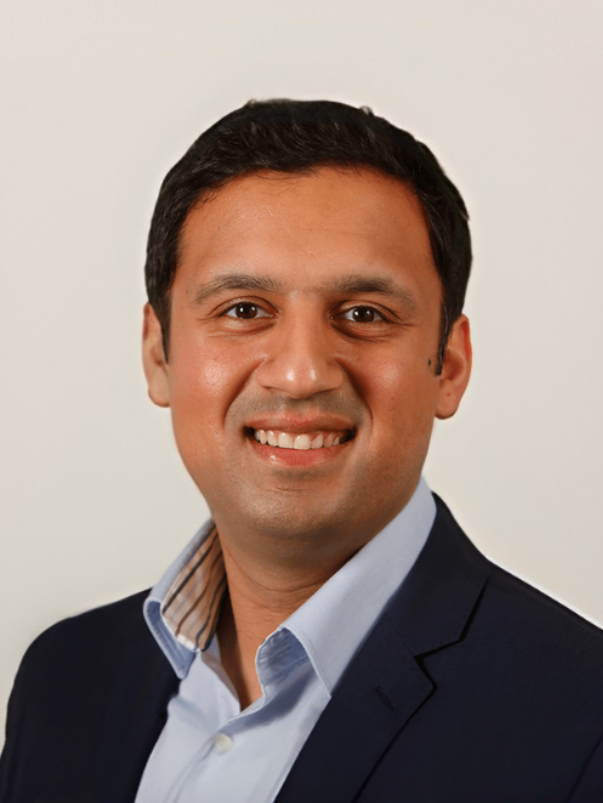

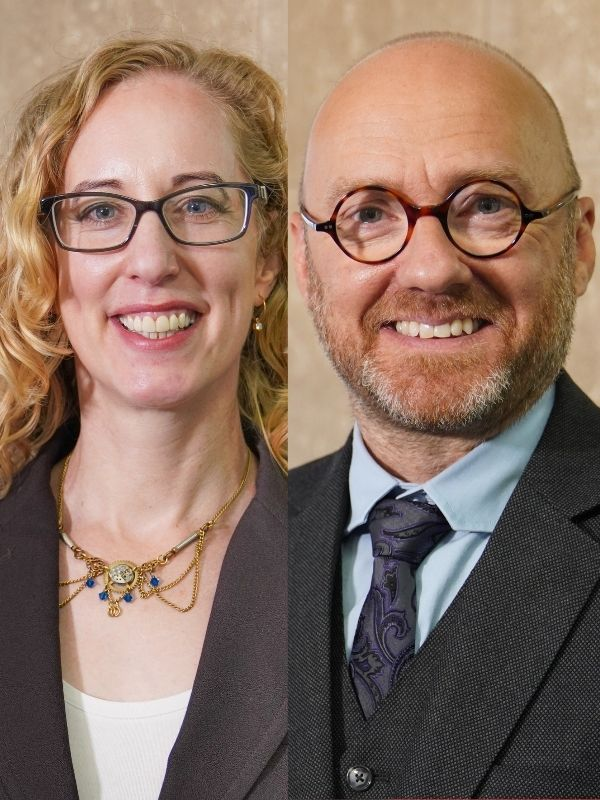

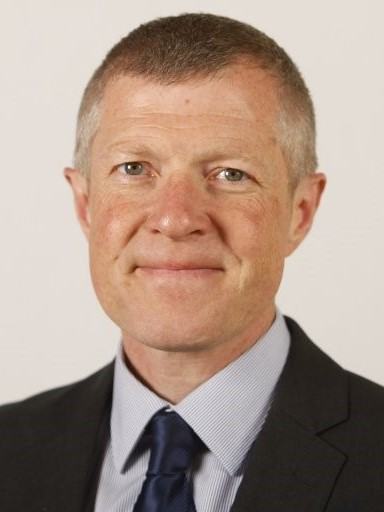
	First party	Second party	Third party
Leader	Nicola Sturgeon	Douglas Ross	Anas Sarwar
Party	SNP	Conservative	Labour
Leader since	14 November 2014	5 August 2020	27 February 2021
Leader's seat	Glasgow Southside	Highlands and Islands (Note: Not an incumbent but elected on the Highlands and Islands regional list while concurrently sitting as a Westminster MP for Moray. Ruth Davidson, the Conservative leader at Holyrood before the leader, stood down at the election to take a seat in the House of Lords.)	Glasgow
Last election	63 seats	31 seats	24 (Note: Includes 13 MSPs sponsored by the Co-operative Party, who are designated Labour and Co-operative.) seats
Seats before	61	30	23 (Note: Includes 12 MSPs sponsored by the Co-operative Party, who are designated Labour and Co-operative.)
Seats won	64	31	22 (Note: Includes 11 MSPs sponsored by the Co-operative Party, who are designated Labour and Co-operative.)
Seat change	▲1	Steady	▼2
Constituency vote	1,291,204	592,526	584,392
% and swing	47.7% ▲1.2%	21.9% ▼0.1%	21.6% ▼1.0%
Regional vote	1,094,374	637,131	485,819
% and swing	40.3% ▼1.4%	23.5% ▲0.6%	17.9% ▼1.2%
	Fourth party	Fifth party
Leader	Lorna Slater / Patrick Harvie	Willie Rennie
Party	Green	Liberal Democrats
Leader since	1 August 2019 / 22 November 2008	17 May 2011
Leader's seat	Lothian (Note: Not an incumbent but stood for this region and won) / Glasgow	North East Fife
Last election	6 seats	5 seats
Seats before	5	5
Seats won	8	4
Seat change	▲2	▼1
Constituency vote	34,990	187,816
% and swing	1.3% ▲0.7%	6.9% ▼0.9%
Regional vote	220,324	137,151
% and swing	8.1% ▲1.5%	5.1% ▼0.1%
- The map shows the election results in single-member constituencies. The additional member MSPs in the 8 regions are shown around the map.
First Minister before election
Nicola Sturgeon
SNP
First Minister after election
Nicola Sturgeon
SNP

An election for the Scottish Parliament was held on 6 May 2021 under the provisions of the Scotland Act 1998. It was the sixth Scottish Parliament election since the devolved parliament was established in 1999. 129 Members of the Scottish Parliament were elected. The election was held alongside the Senedd election in Wales, English local elections, London Assembly and mayoral election and the Hartlepool by-election.

The election campaign started on 25 March 2021, during the COVID-19 pandemic in Scotland. As a result, Parliament went into recess on 5 May, the day before the election. The main parties fielding candidates were: the Scottish National Party (SNP), led by First Minister Nicola Sturgeon; the Scottish Conservatives, led by Douglas Ross; Scottish Labour, led by Anas Sarwar; the Scottish Liberal Democrats, led by Willie Rennie, and the Scottish Greens, jointly led by Patrick Harvie and Lorna Slater. Of those five parties, three had changed their leader since the 2016 election.

Newer parties set up since the 2016 election included: Reform UK Scotland, led by Michelle Ballantyne; the Alba Party, led by former First Minister and SNP leader Alex Salmond; and All for Unity, led by George Galloway. These parties only competed for seats on the regional lists. They all failed to win any seats.

The election resulted in the SNP winning a fourth consecutive term in government. They won 64 seats, a net increase of one from the 2016 election. The SNP gained Edinburgh Central, Ayr, and East Lothian, as well as winning the largest share of the popular vote and the largest number of constituency seats in any Scottish Parliament election (62). The Greens won eight seats, their best result to date at a Scottish Parliament election, while the Conservatives retained second place with 31 seats. Labour had its worst-ever result with 22 seats, and the lowest share of the vote in both constituency and list votes for either Westminster or Holyrood since 1910. The Liberal Democrats also had their worst showing at a Holyrood election to date, winning only four seats.

The SNP and the Greens, both of which support Scottish independence, won 72 of the 129 seats in the parliament. Unionist parties (that is, those against independence) achieved a small majority of votes in constituency contests, whilst pro-independence parties achieved a small majority in the regional lists. The turnout was 63.5%, which is the highest ever at a Scottish Parliament election. Following the election, the third Sturgeon government was formed. It initially consisted of just the SNP, but later included Slater and Harvie of the Scottish Greens as junior ministers after the two parties negotiated a power-sharing agreement.

== Background ==
=== Electoral events ===
==== 2016 Scottish Parliament election ====
At the 2016 election, the ruling Scottish National Party (SNP) lost its parliamentary majority but was able to continue governing under Nicola Sturgeon as a minority administration. At the same election, the Conservatives overtook Labour to place second, whilst the Greens overtook the Liberal Democrats to place fourth. No representatives of minor parties were elected to the Parliament.

==== Other elections ====
Four further elections affecting Scotland took place between the 2016 and 2021 Scottish Parliament elections:

- May 2017: Scottish local government elections. The SNP retained its position as the largest party in terms of votes and councillors. The Conservatives displaced Labour as the second largest party, while the Liberal Democrats suffered a net loss of councillors despite increasing their share of the vote.
- June 2017: United Kingdom general election. The SNP lost 21 of its MPs, winning 35 seats. The Conservatives won 13 seats, with their highest vote share in any election in Scotland since 1979. Labour won seven seats, while the Liberal Democrats won four.
- May 2019: European Parliament election. This was dominated by the impending Brexit-deadline. The SNP won three of the six seats in Scotland, with the Brexit Party, Conservatives and Liberal Democrats each winning one seat.
- December 2019: United Kingdom general election. The SNP increased its share of the vote, reclaiming thirteen of the seats they lost in 2017. The Conservatives won six Scottish seats with a net lost of seven. The Liberal Democrats won four seats with no net losses, but their leader, Jo Swinson, lost her own seat to the SNP. Labour was reduced to a single Scottish seat, a net loss of six.

=== Leadership changes ===
Three parties had undergone leadership changes since the 2016 election. In August 2017, Kezia Dugdale resigned as leader of Scottish Labour and was replaced by Richard Leonard. In January 2021, less than four months before the election, Leonard resigned. Anas Sarwar won the subsequent leadership election.

In August 2019, Lorna Slater and Patrick Harvie became co-leaders of the Scottish Greens.

Also in August 2019, Ruth Davidson resigned as leader of the Scottish Conservatives and was succeeded by Jackson Carlaw. Carlaw resigned as leader in July 2020, with Douglas Ross winning the subsequent leadership election unopposed.

=== Expansion of the electorate ===
The 2021 election was the first to come after the passage of the Scottish Elections (Franchise and Representation) Act, which extended the franchise to those serving prison sentences of 12 months or less. In 2005, the United Kingdom was found in breach of Protocol 1, Article 3 of the European Convention on Human Rights in regards to prisoner voting rights in the European Court of Human Rights as a result of Hirst v United Kingdom (No 2); the Act brings Scotland in line with the court ruling.

This act also allows all foreign nationals resident in Scotland to vote and all those with indefinite leave to remain or equivalent status, including pre–settled status in the United Kingdom, to stand as candidates. A BBC News report in April 2021 said that there were around 55,000 foreign nationals who had been given the right to vote as a result of these changes, including 20,000 refugees.

== Date ==
Under the Scotland Act 1998, an ordinary general election to the Scottish Parliament would normally have been held on the first Thursday in May four years after the 2016 election, i.e. in May 2020. This would have clashed with the proposed date of a UK general election, although this became a moot point when a snap UK general election was held in June 2017 (a further UK general election was held in December 2019). In November 2015, the Scottish Government published a Scottish Elections (Dates) Bill, which proposed to extend the term of the Parliament to five years. This was passed by the Scottish Parliament on 25 February 2016 and received Royal Assent on 30 March 2016, setting the new date for the election as 6 May 2021.

The Scottish Elections (Dates) Act did not affect the legal possibilities for the Parliament to be dissolved earlier, those being;

- That the date of the poll may be varied by up to one month either way by the monarch, on the proposal of the Presiding Officer.
- If Parliament itself resolves that it should be dissolved, with at least two-thirds of the Members (i.e. 86 Members) voting in favour, the Presiding Officer proposes a date for an extraordinary general election and the Parliament is dissolved by the monarch by royal proclamation.
- If Parliament fails to nominate one of its members to be First Minister within 28 days, irrespective of whether at the beginning or in the middle of a parliamentary term. Therefore, if the First Minister resigned, Parliament would then have 28 days to elect a successor and if no new First Minister was elected then the Presiding Officer would ask for Parliament to be dissolved. This process could also be triggered if the First Minister lost a vote of confidence by a simple majority, as they must then resign.

Nevertheless, no extraordinary general elections have been held to date. Any extraordinary general election would be in addition to the ordinary general elections, unless held less than six months before the due date of an ordinary general election, in which case it would supplant it. This would not affect the year in which the subsequent ordinary general election would be held.

On 16 November 2020, the Scottish General Election (Coronavirus) Bill was introduced. This draft legislation stated that while the next election was intended to be held on 6 May 2021, the Presiding Officer would gain the power to postpone the election by up to six months if the spread of COVID-19 made that date impractical. The bill also proposed to change the date of dissolution to the day before the election, meaning that the Parliament could be recalled during the election period. The bill was enacted and received Royal Assent on 29 January 2021. Parliament was in fact recalled on 12 April, to allow MSPs to mark the death of Prince Philip, Duke of Edinburgh.

== Retiring MSPs ==
MSP	Constituency/Region	First elected	Party	Date announced
Neil Findlay	Lothian	2011	Labour	28 May 2019
Mary Fee	West Scotland	2011	Labour	7 August 2019
John Finnie	Highlands and Islands	2011	Green	27 August 2019
Elaine Smith	Central Scotland	1999	Labour	3 September 2019
Ruth Davidson	Edinburgh Central	2011	Conservative	6 October 2019
Bruce Crawford	Stirling	1999	SNP	18 February 2020
Richard Lyle	Uddingston and Bellshill	2011	SNP	20 February 2020
Gail Ross	Caithness, Sutherland and Ross	2016	SNP	27 February 2020
Michael Russell	Argyll and Bute	1999	SNP	1 March 2020
Stewart Stevenson	Banffshire and Buchan Coast	2001	SNP	1 March 2020
Mark McDonald	Aberdeen Donside	2011	Independent (Note: Originally elected as SNP)	5 March 2020
Aileen Campbell	Clydesdale	2007	SNP	8 March 2020
Margaret Mitchell	Central Scotland	2003	Conservative	18 April 2020
David Stewart	Highlands and Islands	2007	Labour	9 June 2020
Angus MacDonald	Falkirk East	2011	SNP	11 June 2020
Iain Gray	East Lothian	1999	Labour	18 June 2020
Adam Tomkins	Glasgow	2016	Conservative	17 July 2020
Gil Paterson	Clydebank and Milngavie	1999	SNP	31 July 2020
Linda Fabiani	East Kilbride	1999	SNP	11 August 2020
Derek Mackay	Renfrewshire North and West	2011	Independent (Note: Originally elected as SNP)	14 August 2020
Roseanna Cunningham	Perthshire South and Kinross-shire	1999	SNP	22 August 2020
Alex Neil	Airdrie and Shotts	1999	SNP	23 August 2020
Jeane Freeman	Carrick, Cumnock and Doon Valley	2016	SNP	24 August 2020
Sandra White	Glasgow Kelvin	1999	SNP	27 August 2020
Maureen Watt	Aberdeen South and North Kincardine	2006 (Note: Co-opted to replace Richard Lochhead, who became a constituency MSP in the 2006 Moray by-election)	SNP	7 September 2020
Peter Chapman	North East Scotland	2016	Conservative	September 2020
Mike Rumbles	North East Scotland	1999	Liberal Democrats	September 2020
Ken Macintosh	West Scotland	1999	Presiding Officer (Note: Originally elected as Labour)	22 September 2020
Jenny Marra	North East Scotland	2011	Labour	28 November 2020
Lewis Macdonald	North East Scotland	1999	Labour	30 November 2020
Johann Lamont	Glasgow	1999	Labour	4 March 2021
Alison Harris	Central Scotland	2016	Conservative	7 March 2021
Bill Bowman	North East Scotland	2016	Conservative	9 March 2021
Tom Mason	North East Scotland	2017	Conservative	9 March 2021

James Dornan announced in February 2020 his intention to retire at the next Holyrood election, but reversed this decision some months later.

== Parties ==
The SNP, Conservatives, Labour and Liberal Democrats fielded candidates in all 73 constituencies and all eight of the regional ballots. Five other parties contested both all eight regions and at least one constituency: the Scottish Greens (12 constituencies) the Scottish Libertarian Party (9), the Scottish Family Party (7), UKIP (5) and the Freedom Alliance (4). Four parties – Abolish the Scottish Parliament Party, Alba Party, All for Unity, and Reform UK – stood in all eight electoral regions, but did not contest any constituencies.

Six other parties contested some of the regions and at least one constituency: TUSC (3 regions and 3 constituencies), Restore Scotland (2 regions, 4 constituencies), Scotia Future (2 of each), the Communist Party of Britain (2 regions and 1 constituency), the Reclaim Party (1 of each) and the Vanguard Party (also 1 of each). Five other parties – Independent Green Voice (5 regions), Renew (5), the Social Democratic Party (2), Women's Equality (2) and Animal Welfare (1) – contested some of the regions, but not any constituencies.

The Scottish Socialist Party, which participated in the last election as part of the electoral alliance RISE – Scotland's Left Alliance, opted not to participate in this election, for the first time since its inception.

=== List of parties contesting all regional ballots ===
Name	Ideology	Leader(s)	2016 Scottish Parliament election result			Seats at dissolution
Name	Ideology	Leader(s)	Votes (%)		Seats	Seats at dissolution
Name	Ideology	Leader(s)	Constituency	Regional	Seats	Seats at dissolution
Scottish National Party	Social democracy Scottish independence	Nicola Sturgeon; MSP for Glasgow Southside	46.5	41.7	63 / 129	61 / 129
Scottish Conservatives	Conservatism; Unionism	Douglas Ross; Not an MSP	22.0	22.9	31 / 129	30 / 129
Scottish Labour	Social democracy Unionism	Anas Sarwar; MSP for Glasgow region	22.6	19.1	24 / 129	23 / 129
Scottish Greens	Green politics Scottish independence	Patrick Harvie (co-leader); MSP for Glasgow region	0.6	6.6	6 / 129	5 / 129
Scottish Greens	Green politics Scottish independence	Lorna Slater (co-leader); Not an MSP	0.6	6.6	6 / 129	5 / 129
Scottish Liberal Democrats	Liberalism; Federalism	Willie Rennie; MSP for North East Fife	7.8	5.2	5 / 129	5 / 129
Reform UK Scotland	Right-wing populism Euroscepticism	Michelle Ballantyne; MSP for South Scotland region	–	–	0 / 129	1 / 129
UKIP Scotland	Right-wing populism Anti-devolution	Donald Mackay; Not an MSP	–	2.0	0 / 129	0 / 129
Scottish Libertarian Party	Libertarianism; Scottish independence	Tam Laird; Not an MSP	0.0	0.1	0 / 129	0 / 129
Scottish Family Party	Anti-abortion; Social conservatism	Richard Lucas; Not an MSP	–	–	Did not exist	0 / 129
Alba Party	Scottish nationalism Scottish independence	Alex Salmond; Not an MSP	–	–	Did not exist	0 / 129
All for Unity	Anti-nationalism; Unionism	Jamie Blackett; Not an MSP	–	–	Did not exist	0 / 129
Abolish the Scottish Parliament	Anti-devolution; Unionism	John Mortimer; Not an MSP	–	–	Did not exist	0 / 129
Freedom Alliance	Anti-lockdown	Carol Dobson; Not an MSP	–	–	Did not exist	0 / 129

== Election system, seats and regions ==
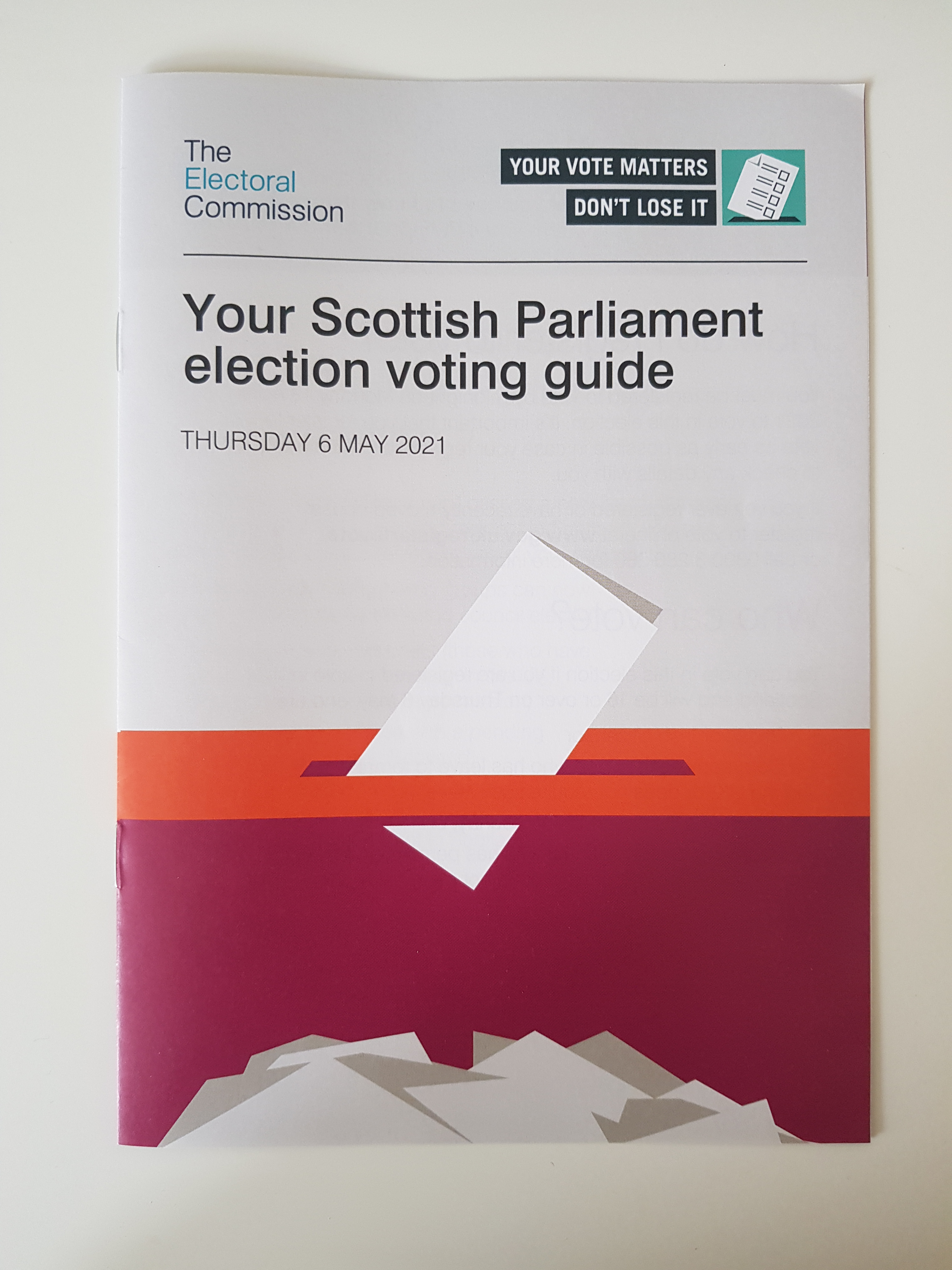
An Electoral Commission voter guide booklet sent to Scottish households ahead of the election.

The total number of Members of the Scottish Parliament (MSPs) elected to the Parliament was 129.

The Scottish Parliament uses an additional member system (AMS), designed to produce approximate proportional representation for each region. There are 8 regions, each sub-divided into 8 to 10 single-member constituencies. There is a total of 73 constituencies. Each constituency elects one MSP by the plurality (first past the post) system of election. Each region elects 7 additional MSPs using an additional member system. A modified D'Hondt method using the constituency results is used to elect these additional MSPs.

The boundaries of the 73 constituencies last changed as of the 2011 Scottish Parliament election, as did the configuration of the electoral regions used to elect "list" members of the Scottish Parliament. These revisions were the outcome of the First Periodical Review of the Scottish Parliament's constituencies and regions conducted by the Boundary Commission for Scotland; the Review was announced on 3 July 2007 and the Commission published its final report on 26 May 2010.

The Scottish Parliament constituencies have not been coterminous with Scottish Westminster constituencies since the 2005 general election, when the 72 former UK Parliament constituencies were replaced with a new set of 59, generally larger, constituencies (see Scottish Parliament (Constituencies) Act 2004). The size difference between Westminster and Holyrood boundaries was due to diverge further upon the implementation of the Sixth Periodic Review of Westminster constituencies, which has not been voted upon by Parliament. The 2023 Periodic Review of Westminster constituencies for a UK total of 650 MPs commenced in England in 2021 and will complete for the UK by 2023.

== Campaign ==
The election campaign started on 25 March 2021. The Scottish Conservatives launched their campaign the same day, with a focus on promoting Scotland's recovery from the COVID-19 pandemic.

On 26 March 2021, the Alba Party was publicly launched by former First Minister of Scotland and SNP leader, Alex Salmond. The party announced plans to stand list-only candidates. Two sitting SNP MPs later defected to the Alba party. The Action for Independence party, which had intended to pursue a similar list-only strategy, announced they would stand down their candidates in favour of Alba. Sturgeon said she would refuse to have any dealings with Salmond unless he apologises to the women who had accused him of harassment. Salmond was ultimately acquitted of all charges.

BBC Scotland announced that it would broadcast two debates between the main parties' leaders; the first was aired on 30 March 2021 and was moderated by the corporation's Scotland editor Sarah Smith. The debate included key questions from the audience on the COVID-19 recovery, climate change, and a second referendum on Scottish independence. The second BBC debate was held on 4 May 2021 and was moderated by BBC Scotland's political editor Glenn Campbell.

Commercial broadcaster STV held their leaders' debate on 13 April, moderated by their political editor Colin Mackay. NUS Scotland held a debate, specifically on student issues, on 20 April; it was moderated by NUS Scotland president Matt Crilly and featured the three main party leaders.

On 1 April, Planet Radio announced that their Clyde 2 station would be hosting a Leaders Phone-In with the main party leaders every Sunday before the election. Douglas Ross was the first to be interviewed on 4 April, with Willie Rennie following on 18 April. Whilst Nicola Sturgeon was set to be interviewed on 11 April, campaigning was delayed following the death of Prince Philip and her phone-in was instead held on 22 April. Patrick Harvie followed on 25 April; and Anas Sarwar had the final phone-in on 2 May.

Following Prince Philip's death on 9 April, the SNP, Conservatives, Labour, Greens and Liberal Democrats said they would suspend election campaigning until further notice. After discussion between the parties, they agreed to resume campaigning after a special parliamentary session on 12 April to make tributes and to pause activities again on the day of the funeral (17 April).

=== Election debates ===
2021 Scottish Parliament election debates
Date	Organisers	Moderator(s)	P Present (Note: Denotes a main invitee attending the event.) S Surrogate (Note: Denotes a main invitee not attending the event, sending a surrogate in their place.) NI Not invited A Absent invitee INV Invited						
Date	Organisers	Moderator(s)	SNP	Conservatives	Labour	Greens	Lib Dems	Audience	Ref.
30 March	BBC Scotland	Sarah Smith	P Sturgeon	P Ross	P Sarwar	P Slater	P Rennie	Virtual	
13 April	STV	Colin Mackay	P Sturgeon	P Ross	P Sarwar	P Harvie	P Rennie		
20 April	NUS Scotland	Matt Crilly	P Sturgeon	P Ross	P Sarwar	S Greer (Note: Ross Greer, Scottish Green spokesperson on International Development and External Affairs, Education and Skills, and Culture and Media.)	S Ford (Note: Carole Ford, Liberal Democrat spokesperson on Children and Young People.)	Virtual	
22 April	BBC (Question Time Special)	Fiona Bruce	S Brown (Note: Keith Brown, SNP Depute Leader.)	P Ross	P Sarwar	P Slater	P Rennie	Virtual	
27 April	Channel 4 News	Krishnan Guru-Murthy	P Sturgeon	P Ross	P Sarwar	P Harvie	P Rennie		
4 May	BBC Scotland	Glenn Campbell	P Sturgeon	P Ross	P Sarwar	P Harvie	P Rennie		

== Opinion polling ==
Graph of opinion poll results prior to the 2021 Scottish Parliament election. Trendlines are 30-day moving averages.

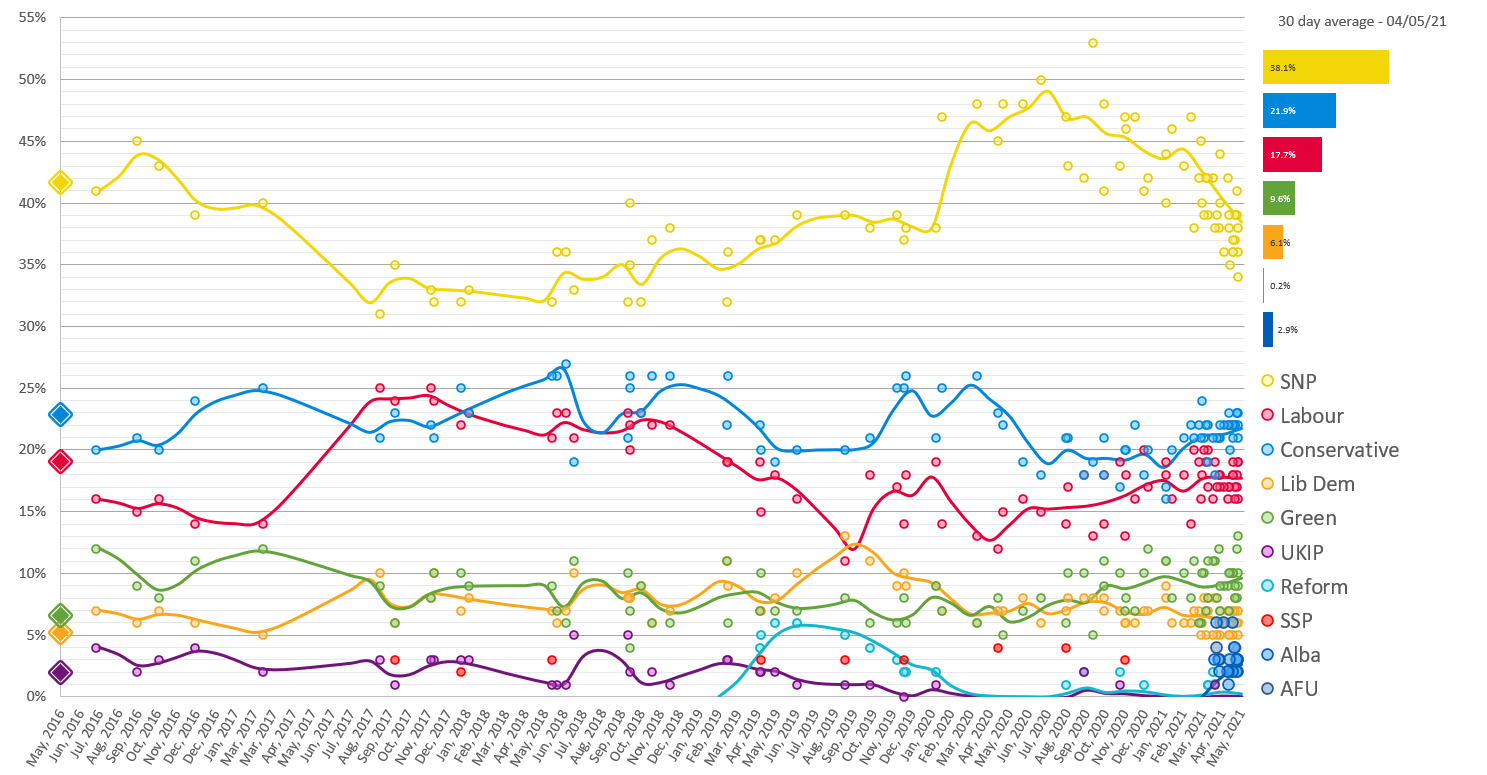

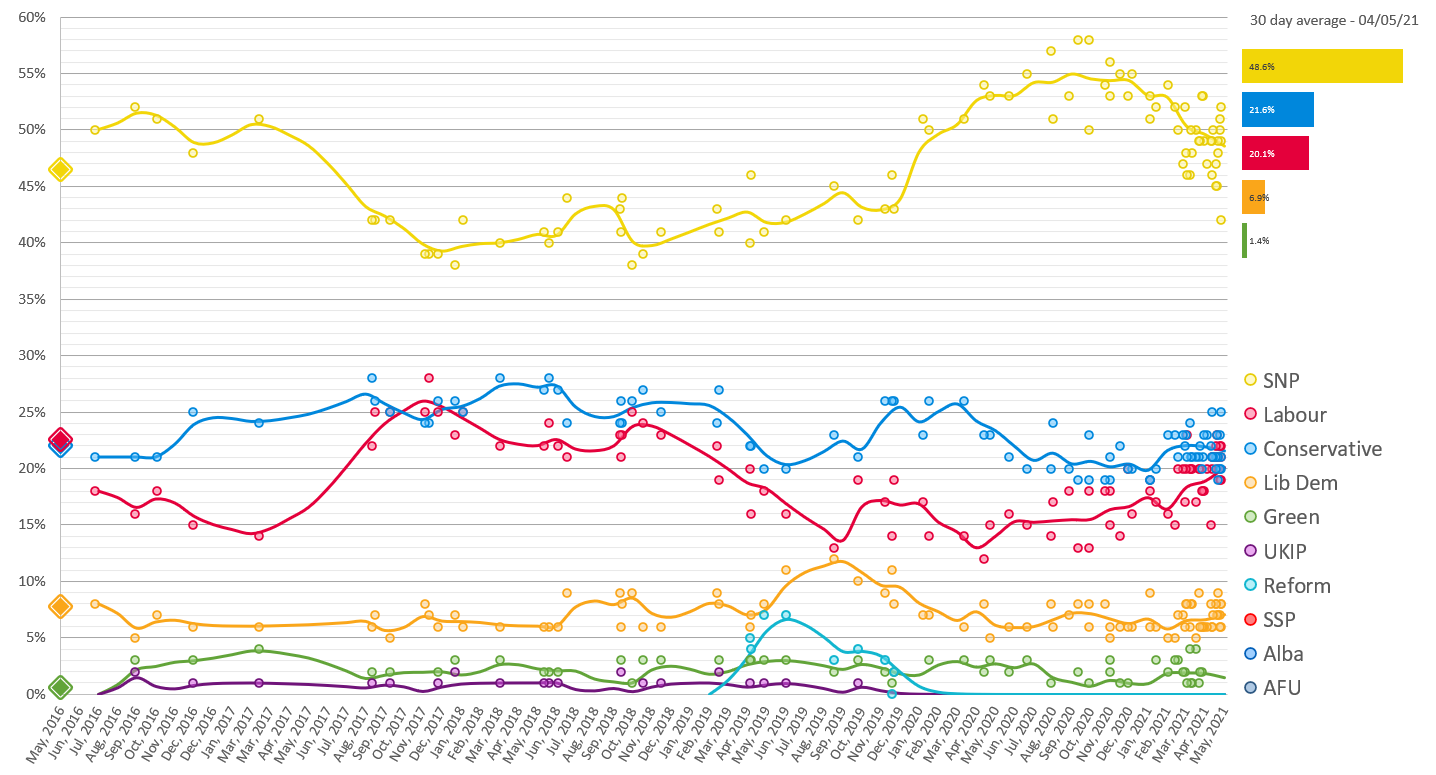

Key

SNP – Scottish National Party
Conservative – Scottish Conservatives
Labour – Scottish Labour
Lib Dem – Scottish Liberal Democrats
Green – Scottish Greens
UKIP – UK Independence Party
Reform – Reform UK
SSP – Scottish Socialist Party
Alba – Alba Party
AFU – All for Unity

== Target seats ==
Below are listed all the constituencies which required a swing of less than 5% from the 2016 result to change hands. The most marginal opportunity for the Greens was in Glasgow Kelvin, which they needed a 7.1% swing to gain. The Liberal Democrats' best bet was Caithness, Sutherland and Ross, which required a 6.1% swing. The SNP ended up holding both of these constituencies.

=== SNP targets ===
Rank	Constituency	Winning party in 2016	Swing to gain %	SNP's place in 2016	Result
1	Dumbarton	Labour	0.17	2nd	Labour hold
2	Edinburgh Central	Conservative	0.90	2nd	SNP gain
3	Ayr	Conservative	1.00	2nd	SNP gain
4	Aberdeenshire West	Conservative	1.28	2nd	Conservative hold
5	East Lothian	Labour	1.45	2nd	SNP gain
6	Edinburgh Southern	Labour	1.47	2nd	Labour hold
7	Dumfriesshire	Conservative	1.70	2nd	Conservative hold
8	Eastwood	Conservative	2.22	2nd	Conservative hold
9	Galloway and West Dumfries	Conservative	2.27	2nd	Conservative hold
10	Edinburgh Western	Liberal Democrats	3.73	2nd	Lib Dems hold

=== Conservative targets ===
Rank	Constituency	Winning party in 2016	Swing to gain %	Cons' place in 2016	Result
1	Perthshire South and Kinross-shire	SNP	1.97	2nd	SNP hold
2	Edinburgh Pentlands	SNP	3.68	2nd	SNP hold
3	Angus North and Mearns	SNP	4.21	2nd	SNP hold
4	Aberdeen South and North Kincardine	SNP	4.26	2nd	SNP hold
5	Moray	SNP	4.30	2nd	SNP hold
6	Edinburgh Southern	Labour	4.74	3rd	Labour hold
7	Perthshire North	SNP	4.90	2nd	SNP hold

=== Labour targets ===
Rank	Constituency	Winning party in 2016	Swing to gain %	Labour's place in 2016	Result
1	Eastwood	Conservative	2.56	3rd	Conservative hold
2	Edinburgh Central	Conservative	4.19	3rd	SNP gain

== Results ==

Election result with constituency names labeled

=== Overall ===
Party	Constituency			Regional			Total seats	+/–
Party	Votes	%	Seats	Votes	%	Seats	Total seats	+/–
Scottish National Party	1,291,204	47.70	62	1,094,374	40.34	2	64	+1
Conservative	592,526	21.89	5	637,131	23.49	26	31	0
Labour (Note: Includes 11 MSPs sponsored by the Co-operative Party, who are designated Labour and Co-operative.)	584,392	21.59	2	485,819	17.91	20	22	–2
Greens	34,990	1.29	0	220,324	8.12	8	8	+2
Liberal Democrats	187,816	6.94	4	137,151	5.06	0	4	–1
Alba				44,913	1.66	0	0	New
All for Unity				23,299	0.86	0	0	New
Scottish Family Party	2,734	0.10	0	16,085	0.59	0	0	New
Independent Green Voice				9,756	0.36	0	0	New
Abolish the Scottish Parliament				7,262	0.27	0	0	New
Freedom Alliance	1,154	0.04	0	6,271	0.23	0	0	New
Reform UK				5,793	0.21	0	0	New
Libertarian	1,913	0.07	0	4,987	0.18	0	0	0
UKIP	699	0.03	0	3,898	0.14	0	0	0
Animal Welfare				2,392	0.09	0	0	0
Women's Equality				1,896	0.07	0	0	0
TUSC	959	0.04	0	1,404	0.05	0	0	0
Restore Scotland	1,192	0.04	0	1,149	0.04	0	0	New
Communist Party of Britain	194	0.01	0	1,142	0.04	0	0	0
Renew				493	0.02	0	0	New
Scotia Future	1,032	0.04	0	451	0.02	0	0	New
Social Democratic				405	0.01	0	0	New
Reclaim	114	0.00	0	174	0.01	0	0	New
Vanguard	67	0.00	0	92	0.00	0	0	New
Liberal	102	0.00	0				0	New
Independents	5,673	0.21	0	6,122	0.23	0	0	0
Total	2,706,761	100.00	73	2,712,783	100.00	56	129	0
Valid votes	2,706,761	99.63		2,712,783	99.81			
Invalid/blank votes	10,024	0.37		5,282	0.19			
Total votes	2,716,785	100.00		2,718,065	100.00			
Registered voters/turnout	4,280,785	63.46		4,280,785	63.49			
Source: Electoral Management Board for Scotland

(Note: no mechanism is used to have the overall seat counts for each party reflect the party share of the overall vote. Each region is taken independently and seats in each region are allocated just as per the region's vote.)

=== Votes summary ===
↓
64	8	31	22	4
SNP	Green	Conservative	Labour	LD

Popular Vote (Constituency)
SNP	47.70%
Conservative	21.89%
Labour	21.59%
Liberal Democrats	6.94%
Green	1.29%
Other	0.59%

Popular Vote (Regional)
SNP	40.34%
Conservative	23.49%
Labour	17.91%
Green	8.12%
Liberal Democrats	5.06%
Alba	1.66%
Other	3.42%

Parliament seats
SNP	49.61%
Conservative	24.00%
Labour	17.05%
Green	6.20%
Liberal Democrats	3.10%

=== Central Scotland ===
2021 Scottish Parliament election: Central Scotland constituencies
Constituency	Elected member	Result
Airdrie and Shotts	Neil Gray	SNP hold
Coatbridge and Chryston	Fulton MacGregor	SNP hold
Cumbernauld and Kilsyth	Jamie Hepburn	SNP hold
East Kilbride	Collette Stevenson	SNP hold
Falkirk East	Michelle Thomson	SNP hold
Falkirk West	Michael Matheson	SNP hold
Hamilton, Larkhall and Stonehouse	Christina McKelvie	SNP hold
Motherwell and Wishaw	Clare Adamson	SNP hold
Uddingston and Bellshill	Stephanie Callaghan	SNP hold

2021 Scottish Parliament election: Central Scotland regional list
Party	Elected candidates	Seats	+/−	Votes	%	+/−%
SNP		0	Steady	148,399	45.3	▼2.4
Labour	Richard Leonard; Monica Lennon; Mark Griffin	3	▼1	77,623	23.7	▼1.1
Conservative	Stephen Kerr; Graham Simpson; Meghan Gallacher	3	Steady	59,896	18.3	▲2.2
Green	Gillian Mackay	1	▲1	19,512	6.0	▲1.3

=== Glasgow ===
2021 Scottish Parliament election: Glasgow constituencies
Constituency	Elected member	Result
Glasgow Anniesland	Bill Kidd	SNP hold
Glasgow Cathcart	James Dornan	SNP hold
Glasgow Kelvin	Kaukab Stewart	SNP hold
Glasgow Maryhill and Springburn	Bob Doris	SNP hold
Glasgow Pollok	Humza Yousaf	SNP hold
Glasgow Provan	Ivan McKee	SNP hold
Glasgow Shettleston	John Mason	SNP hold
Glasgow Southside	Nicola Sturgeon	SNP hold
Rutherglen	Clare Haughey	SNP hold

2021 Scottish Parliament election: Glasgow regional list
Party	Elected candidates	Seats	+/−	Votes	%	+/−%
SNP		0	Steady	133,917	43.9	▼0.9
Labour	Pauline McNeill; Anas Sarwar; Paul Sweeney; Pam Duncan-Glancy	4	Steady	74,088	24.3	▲0.5
Conservative	Annie Wells; Sandesh Gulhane	2	Steady	37,027	12.1	▲0.2
Green	Patrick Harvie	1	Steady	36,114	11.8	▲2.4

=== Highlands and Islands ===
2021 Scottish Parliament election: Highlands and Islands constituencies
Constituency	Elected member	Result
Argyll and Bute	Jenni Minto	SNP hold
Caithness, Sutherland and Ross	Maree Todd	SNP hold
Inverness and Nairn	Fergus Ewing	SNP hold
Moray	Richard Lochhead	SNP hold
Na h-Eileanan an Iar	Alasdair Allan	SNP hold
Orkney	Liam McArthur	Liberal Democrat hold
Shetland	Beatrice Wishart	Liberal Democrat hold
Skye, Lochaber and Badenoch	Kate Forbes	SNP hold

2021 Scottish Parliament election: Highlands and Islands regional list
Party	Elected candidates	Seats	+/−	Votes	%	+/−%
SNP	Emma Roddick	1	Steady	96,433	40.4	▲0.7
Conservative	Douglas Ross; Donald Cameron; Edward Mountain; Jamie Halcro Johnston	4	▲1	60,779	25.4	▲3.6
Liberal Democrats		0	Steady	26,771	11.2	▲2.1
Labour	Rhoda Grant	1	▼1	22,713	9.5	▼1.7
Green	Ariane Burgess	1	Steady	17,729	7.4	▲0.2

=== Lothian ===
2021 Scottish Parliament election: Lothian constituencies
Constituency	Elected member	Result
Almond Valley	Angela Constance	SNP hold
Edinburgh Central	Angus Robertson	SNP gain from Conservative
Edinburgh Eastern	Ash Denham	SNP hold
Edinburgh Northern and Leith	Ben Macpherson	SNP hold
Edinburgh Pentlands	Gordon MacDonald	SNP hold
Edinburgh Southern	Daniel Johnson	Labour hold
Edinburgh Western	Alex Cole-Hamilton	Liberal Democrat hold
Linlithgow	Fiona Hyslop	SNP hold
Midlothian North and Musselburgh	Colin Beattie	SNP hold

2021 Scottish Parliament election: Lothian regional list
Party	Elected candidates	Seats	+/−	Votes	%	+/−%
SNP		0	Steady	141,478	35.9	▼0.3
Conservative	Miles Briggs; Sue Webber; Jeremy Balfour	3	Steady	78,595	19.9	▼3.0
Labour	Sarah Boyack; Foysol Choudhury	2	Steady	76,689	19.4	▼1.4
Green	Alison Johnstone; Lorna Slater	2	Steady	49,984	12.7	▲2.1
Liberal Democrats		0	Steady	28,433	7.2	▲1.6

=== Mid Scotland and Fife ===
2021 Scottish Parliament election: Mid Scotland and Fife constituencies
Constituency	Elected member	Result
Clackmannanshire and Dunblane	Keith Brown	SNP hold
Cowdenbeath	Annabelle Ewing	SNP hold
Dunfermline	Shirley-Anne Somerville	SNP hold
Kirkcaldy	David Torrance	SNP hold
Mid Fife and Glenrothes	Jenny Gilruth	SNP hold
North East Fife	Willie Rennie	Liberal Democrat hold
Perthshire North	John Swinney	SNP hold
Perthshire South and Kinross-shire	Jim Fairlie	SNP hold
Stirling	Evelyn Tweed	SNP hold

2021 Scottish Parliament election: Mid Scotland and Fife regional list
Party	Elected candidates	Seats	+/−	Votes	%	+/−%
SNP		0	Steady	136,825	39.8	▼1.5
Conservative	Murdo Fraser; Liz Smith; Dean Lockhart; Alexander Stewart	4	Steady	85,909	25.0	▼0.2
Labour	Claire Baker; Alex Rowley	2	Steady	52,626	15.3	▼2.3
Green	Mark Ruskell	1	Steady	28,654	8.3	▲2.2
Liberal Democrats		0	Steady	25,489	7.4	▲0.4

=== North East Scotland ===
2021 Scottish Parliament election: North East Scotland constituencies
Constituency	Elected member	Result
Aberdeen Central	Kevin Stewart	SNP hold
Aberdeen Donside	Jackie Dunbar	SNP hold
Aberdeen South and North Kincardine	Audrey Nicoll	SNP hold
Aberdeenshire East	Gillian Martin	SNP hold
Aberdeenshire West	Alexander Burnett	Conservative hold
Angus North & Mearns	Mairi Gougeon	SNP hold
Angus South	Graeme Dey	SNP hold
Banffshire & Buchan Coast	Karen Adam	SNP hold
Dundee City East	Shona Robison	SNP hold
Dundee City West	Joe FitzPatrick	SNP hold

2021 Scottish Parliament election: North East Scotland regional list
Party	Elected candidates	Seats	+/−	Votes	%	+/−%
SNP		0	Steady	147,910	40.9	▼3.8
Conservative	Liam Kerr; Douglas Lumsden; Maurice Golden; Tess White	4	Steady	110,555	30.6	▲2.6
Labour	Michael Marra; Mercedes Villalba	2	Steady	41,062	11.4	▼1.2
Green	Maggie Chapman	1	▲1	22,735	6.3	▲1.4
Liberal Democrats		0	▼1	18,051	5.0	▼1.0

=== South Scotland ===
2021 Scottish Parliament election: South Scotland constituencies
Constituency	Elected member	Result
Ayr	Siobhian Brown	SNP gain from Conservative
Carrick, Cumnock and Doon Valley	Elena Whitham	SNP hold
Clydesdale	Màiri McAllan	SNP hold
Dumfriesshire	Oliver Mundell	Conservative hold
East Lothian	Paul McLennan	SNP gain from Labour
Ettrick, Roxburgh and Berwickshire	Rachael Hamilton	Conservative hold
Galloway and West Dumfries	Finlay Carson	Conservative hold
Kilmarnock and Irvine Valley	Willie Coffey	SNP hold
Midlothian South, Tweeddale and Lauderdale	Christine Grahame	SNP hold

2021 Scottish Parliament election: South Scotland regional list
Party	Elected candidates	Seats	+/−	Votes	%	+/−%
SNP	Emma Harper	1	▼2	136,741	37.6	▼0.7
Conservative	Craig Hoy; Brian Whittle; Sharon Dowey	3	▲1	121,730	33.5	▲1.4
Labour	Colin Smyth; Carol Mochan; Martin Whitfield	3	▲1	57,236	15.7	▼2.1

=== West Scotland ===
2021 Scottish Parliament election: West Scotland constituencies
Constituency	Elected member	Result
Clydebank and Milngavie	Marie McNair	SNP hold
Cunninghame North	Kenneth Gibson	SNP hold
Cunninghame South	Ruth Maguire	SNP hold
Dumbarton	Jackie Baillie	Labour hold
Eastwood	Jackson Carlaw	Conservative hold
Greenock and Inverclyde	Stuart McMillan	SNP hold
Paisley	George Adam	SNP hold
Renfrewshire North and West	Natalie Don	SNP hold
Renfrewshire South	Tom Arthur	SNP hold
Strathkelvin and Bearsden	Rona Mackay	SNP hold

2021 Scottish Parliament election: West Scotland regional list
Party	Elected candidates	Seats	+/−	Votes	%	+/−%
SNP		0	Steady	152,671	40.4	▼1.8
Labour	Neil Bibby; Katy Clark; Paul O'Kane	3	Steady	83,782	22.2	▼0.3
Conservative	Russell Findlay; Jamie Greene; Pam Gosal	3	Steady	82,640	21.9	▼0.3
Green	Ross Greer	1	Steady	26,632	7.1	▲1.8

=== Constituency seat changes compared to 2016 ===
Constituency	Gain	Loss
Ayr	SNP	Conservative
East Lothian	SNP	Labour
Edinburgh Central	SNP	Conservative

=== MSPs who lost their seats ===
MSP	Constituency/Region	Party
Michelle Ballantyne	South Scotland	Reform
Claudia Beamish	South Scotland	Labour
Maurice Corry	West Scotland	Conservative
James Kelly	Glasgow	Labour
Gordon Lindhurst	Lothian	Conservative
Joan McAlpine	South Scotland	SNP
John Scott	Ayr	Conservative
Paul Wheelhouse	South Scotland	SNP
Andy Wightman	Lothian (contested Highlands and Islands)	Scottish Greens (contested as independent)

=== Analysis ===
The SNP won 64 seats, falling one seat short of an overall majority. Some commentators put this down to unionists voting tactically for Conservative, Labour and Liberal Democrat candidates. According to psephologist John Curtice, "Denying the SNP an overall majority was, indeed, a collective effort – at least on the part of Unionist voters, who on the constituency ballot demonstrated a remarkable willingness to back whichever pro-Union party appeared to be best placed locally to defeat the SNP. [...] These patterns had a decisive impact on the outcome." This was apparent in seats like Dumbarton, where incumbent Labour MSP Jackie Baillie saw her 0.3% majority increased to 3.9%, whilst both the Conservative and Lib Dem vote share decreased.

In The National, Emer O'Toole questioned whether social media adverts with "a lack of transparency over funding" may have cost the SNP key seats as well. The day before the election, The Guardian reported that anti-independence groups and campaigners had "spent tens of thousands of pounds in the past week", including on Facebook adverts, calling for tactical voting to prevent the SNP getting a majority. One of these groups was Scotland Matters, whose founder, Professor Hugh Pennington said, "Across the country as a whole, tactical voting is obviously one of the ways forward to basically harm the SNP, not to put too fine a point on it."

Additionally, the Greens claimed that they may have been deprived of two seats because of Independent Green Voice (IGV), a far-right party which has nothing to do with the Scottish Greens (who support Scottish independence). IGV received nearly 10,000 votes, including 2,210 in Glasgow (where the Greens were 1,000 short of gaining a seat) and 1,690 in South Scotland (where the Greens fell 100 short). This potentially prevented pro-independence parties from having a 19-seat majority instead of 15 seats.

The Scottish and Welsh Election Studies 2021, revealed on 13 June, found that around a third of Scottish voters who decided to vote differently in the run-up to the election did so to stop another party, and that 90% of those who did this did so in a bid to prevent the SNP winning the seat. Rob Johns, Professor in Politics at the University of Essex, said: "[W]e found a lot more switching than we had expected. The polls had suggested that not much was changing and obviously the overall election result was almost eerily similar to 2016. That can mean that nobody has changed their mind or it can mean lots of people have changed their mind – but these have cancelled out as people have moved in opposing directions. We found there was quite a lot more of that than we had expected."

=== Voter demographics ===
Data from Savanta ComRes:

The 2021 Scottish Parliament constituency vote
Social group	SNP	Con	Lab	Lib Dem	Others
Total vote	48	22	18	5	7
Gender
Male	43	26	24	7	0
Female	52	16	24	5	3
Age
16–34	58	10	24	3	5
35–54	51	16	25	5	3
55+	38	31	22	9	0

== Campaign spending ==
Party	Expenses
SNP	£1,468,343
Conservative	£1,359,435
Labour	£1,176,410
Liberal Democrats	£434,354
Green	£231,902
Alba	£214,371
Reform	£54,504
Scottish Family	£32,908
All for Unity	£29,620
TUSC	£13,753
Reclaim	£10,199
UKIP	£8,230
Freedom Alliance	£7,387
Communist	£6,420

== Aftermath ==
Election of the First Minister
Ballot →	18 May 2021	
Required majority →	50 out of 99 valid votes	
Nicola Sturgeon (SNP): • Scottish National Party (64)	64 / 129	check
Douglas Ross (Conservative): • Scottish Conservatives (31)	31 / 129	X mark
Willie Rennie (Lib Dem): • Scottish Liberal Democrats (4)	4 / 129	X mark
Abstentions: • Scottish Labour (21); • Scottish Greens (7)	28 / 129	
Not voting: • Scottish Labour (1); • Presiding Officer (1)	2 / 129	

Nicola Sturgeon was nominated as First Minister by a vote held on 18 May 2021. Her cabinet was approved by the parliament two days later and thus the Third Sturgeon government, a minority government, was formed.

On 3 August 2021, it was reported that a co-operation agreement between the SNP and the Greens was "on the brink of being finalised" and could see Green MSPs take ministerial positions in government. On 19 August, the power-sharing agreement between the two parties was announced. Under the terms of the agreement, the Greens have two MSPs appointed as junior ministers in the government who are invited to attend cabinet meetings when their portfolios are being discussed. The Greens signed up to the bulk of the SNP's policies, but in areas of disagreement such as international relations and fee-paying schools the two parties are free to publicly disagree. The agreement states that the Greens support the government on votes of confidence and supply.

A deal that would see Patrick Harvie and Lorna Slater made ministers was revealed on 26 August, subject to being voted upon by Green Party members. Two days later, members of both parties overwhelmingly voted in favour of the deal.

== See also ==
Other elections in the UK which were held on the same day:

- 2021 London Assembly election
- 2021 London mayoral election
- 2021 Senedd election
- 2021 United Kingdom local elections
