= Jamie Blackett =

21st-century British landowner and writer

- Born: James William Beauchamp Blackett; 17 October 1964 (age 61)
- Education: Eton College
- Occupations: Writer, retired Army Officer
- Spouse: Sheralyn
- Children: 2
- Writing career
- Notable works: The Enigma of Kidson; Red Rag to a Bull; Rural Life in an Urban Age

James William Beauchamp Blackett (born 17 October 1964) is a British author, playwright, columnist, landowner and farmer, and political activist, who served as leader of the All for Unity party from 2021, until the party's dissolution in 2022. He has written articles appearing in The Daily Telegraph, The Spectator and other publications. He writes regularly for Country Life and wrote a monthly column, "Farming Life", for Country Life from 2019 to 2023. He was a founder contributor of the online countryside magazine Scribehound for which he writes a monthly column. He is also a regular commentator on GB News and a regular guest on BBC Radio 2 Jeremy Vine Show.

== Early life and career ==
Educated at Ludgrove School and Eton College, Blackett enlisted as a private soldier at The Guards Depot before training at The Royal Military Academy Sandhurst and served as an officer in the Coldstream Guards from 1984 to 2002, including service in Northern Ireland during The Troubles and the first Gulf War. In addition, he served as a Deputy Lieutenant for Dumfriesshire from 2013 to 2020. Blackett has been a member of the Royal Company of Archers since 2012.

Blackett is a direct descendant of Christopher Blackett of Wylam Hall, Northumberland, founder of The Globe newspaper, and entrepreneur behind the world's oldest surviving steam engine Puffing Billy.

== Literary career ==
Although he writes mainly about rural matters, Blackett's first book The Enigma of Kidson is a partly autobiographical portrait of teacher Michael Kidson, whose pupils at Eton College included former Prime Minister David Cameron. In the book, Blackett describes being beaten by the Headmaster, Michael McCrum, one of the last acts of corporal punishment at the school. Blackett has been commissioned by theatre producers, The Anthology Group to adapt the work for the stage and a production is planned for 2027..

His books, Red Rag to a Bull (2018) and its sequel Land of Milk and Honey (2022) tell how he arrived home from military service to take over Arbigland, an agricultural estate on the Solway Firth in Dumfries and Galloway to find a rapidly changing countryside. Set over 20 years through the Scottish independence referendum, hunting ban, Brexit, Coronavirus and the 2021 Scottish Parliamentary Elections, the books cover challenges threatening a way of life and an emerging rural philosophy in which farmers have greater freedom to manage the countryside.

== Political career ==
In 2020, Blackett became the Deputy Leader of the Alliance for Unity, a party which was founded by George Galloway to contest the 2021 Scottish Parliament election. The registered name of the party became All for Unity, with Blackett as the Leader and Galloway as the Nominating Officer and Lead Spokesperson. In the election, Galloway stood as the lead candidate, with Blackett as second, in the South Scotland electoral region. He and Galloway spoke out against what they saw as the increasingly corrupt and extreme nationalism of the Scottish National Party and the ‘Ulsterisation’ of Scotland, Blackett linking it to his first-hand experience as a soldier in Northern Ireland. Blackett later broke with Galloway and All for Unity was de-registered as a political party.

Blackett has become increasingly active as a countryside campaigner. He is an ambassador for Love British Food In July 2026 he founded Ground Cry, the campaign to save meadow birds, waders and other ground nesting birds.
