= Karen Adam =

Scottish National Party politician

Karen Adam MSP
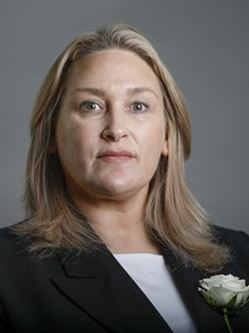
- Official portrait, 2026

Member of the Scottish Parliament for Banffshire and Buchan Coast
- Incumbent
- Assumed office 6 May 2021
- Preceded by: Stewart Stevenson
- Majority: 364 (1.2%)

Convener of the Education and Gaelic Committee
- Incumbent
- Assumed office 10 June 2026

Personal details
- Born: Karen Adam; 7 June 1975 (age 51) Aberdeen, Scotland
- Party: Scottish National Party
- Children: 6

Karen Adam (born 7 June 1975) is a Scottish politician who has been the Member of the Scottish Parliament (MSP) for Banffshire and Buchan Coast since 2021, and is currently the convener of the Education and Gaelic Committee. A member of the Scottish National Party (SNP), she was previously a councillor for the Mid-Formartine ward of Aberdeenshire from 2017 until her election as an MSP in May 2021.

== Early life ==
Karen Adam was born on 7 June 1975 in Aberdeen. She was raised in a same-sex household, with her mother and her partner. As a child, she learned British Sign Language as a way to communicate with her deaf father. Adam became a mother as a teenager and she volunteered in her community.

== Political career ==
=== Early career ===
Adam joined the Scottish National Party in 2014, with her parents who have been members of the party since the 1960s. She was elected as councillor for the Mid-Formartine ward in the Aberdeenshire Council in the 2017 Scottish local elections. As a councillor, she worked to update the council's plans for the disabled, such as the sign language plan and autism strategy.

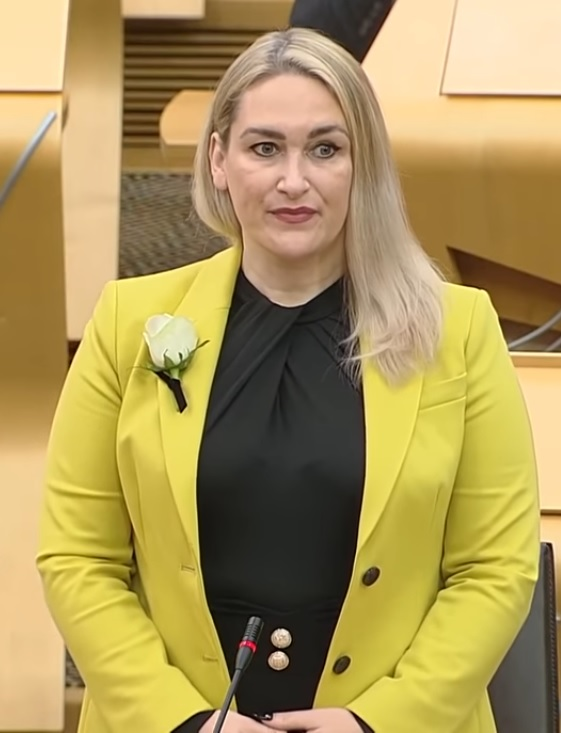
Adam preparing to swear in as an MSP, May 2021

=== Election to Holyrood ===
In November 2020, she was announced as the SNP's candidate for the Banffshire and Buchan Coast constituency for the 2021 Scottish election, succeeding five-term holder Stewart Stevenson. She was elected to serve as the MSP for the constituency, though the SNP's lead dropped from 23% to 2.3% (772 votes). On the day she was sworn in, Adam was the first ever MSP to take the oath of affirmation in British Sign Language.

==== Death threat ====
In November 2020, Adam became subject to a death threat on social media. On Twitter, she posted an upcoming event that was happening in Aberdeenshire, when she received a reply which said "I want to shoot you in the head. You are not serious." Adam originally thought the reply was made by a bot account, until she found out it was a real person.

Police made a visit to her property and they insisted she installed CCTV in her home. Adam's phone number was placed on the police's log list, meaning if she calls them, she will receive an answer urgently. The account was reported to the police and has been suspended by Twitter.

==== Backbencher ====
Adam has been a member of the Scottish Parliament's Equalities, Human Rights and Civil Justice Committee and the Rural Affairs, Islands and Natural Environment Committee.

In January 2022, Adam responded to Ghislaine Maxwell's conviction for sexual abuse by tweeting: "Paedophiles and predators are people. Not bogey men under the bed. Not Mac wearing flashers in the street, faceless and nameless. They are our family, friends and colleagues. They are not scary monsters. They are people who abuse. It's uncomfortable to humanise them because we then have to face the horrors in plain sight." Alba Party general secretary Christopher McEleny interpreted this as an attempt to humanise child abusers, which Adam firmly rejected. She was sent death threats and Police Scotland later launched an investigation. She later told The Guardian: "It started to dawn on me that this was not accidental, that people were perhaps purposely misrepresenting my words. [They were] purposely misrepresenting my words for political gain and to support political movements. I've seen this before. The more open I am about my progressive views, the more I am called a pervert, or a predator enabler, for supporting trans rights, for supporting LGBT rights overall."

Adam condemned what she called a "malcious, creepy attempt" to silence her in December 2022 during a GRA reform debate. In April 2023 a police probe found that the incident was the result of an innocent mix-up at an Edinburgh salon. A woman with a similar name to Adam had tried to make a genuine appointment and the MSP got the confirmation email, in what police sources confirmed was an “administrative error".

In February 2025, Adam was reported to be on an all-female "hit list" of SNP MSPs that were to be asked to stand down from the Scottish Parliament to make room for ex-MPs who had lost their seats in the 2024 general election. The alleged list was reported to have been drawn up at Stephen Flynn's direction by Aberdeenshire North and Moray East MP Seamus Logan.

== Personal life ==
Adam lives in Aberdeenshire with her five sons. She is grandmother to her oldest and only daughter's children. She is a carer to her deaf father and has six children, some with special needs. She had her first child as a teenager and married the child's father, but later divorced him due to spousal abuse. After the divorce, she became a Mormon for 20 years, but left the church after divorcing her second husband and father of the rest of her children, who was having an affair.

Scottish Parliament
Preceded by Stewart Stevenson	Member of the Scottish Parliament for Banffshire and Buchan Coast; 2021–present	Incumbent
