= Planet Radio =

Australian radio station

Coordinates: 27°33′40.67″S 153°03′55.92″E

Planet Radio is a community radio station based in Brisbane, Australia dedicated to promoting environmental issues and independent music. It narrowcasts on 88 FM to many locations in Brisbane, though some of its programmes are podcast to reach a wider audience via the Internet. Its web site claims Planet Radio is the "world's first environmental radio service".

== Programmes ==
Some of the weekly programmes on Planet Radio include:

- A Climate Affair – critical discussion of current environmental and societal issues
- Acoustic Harvest – acoustic music programme
- Agreeable Distortion – "cutting edge" indie music
- The Peanut Gallery – a "twisted and obtuse" comedy show
