= All for Unity =

Scottish unionist political and electoral alliance

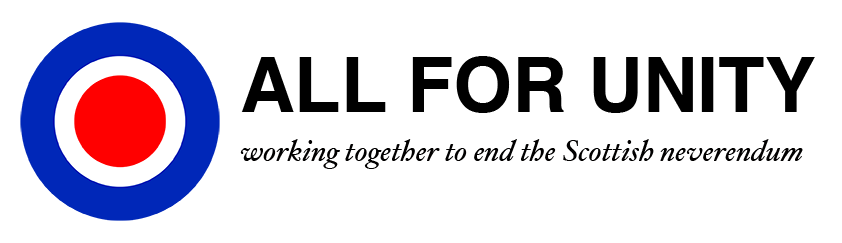
- Founder and Lead Spokesperson: George Galloway
- Leader: Jamie Blackett
- Founded: July 2020
- Registered: PP12579
- Dissolved: May 2022
- Headquarters: 4 Fullarton Street; Ayr; KA7 1UB
- Ideology: Scottish unionism; British unionism
- Political position: Catch-all
- Colours: Red, white and blue

Website
- www.alliance4unity.uk

All for Unity (formerly Alliance 4 Unity) was a political and electoral alliance in Scotland. Founded in July 2020 by George Galloway, it was a British unionist party which opposed Scottish independence. It fielded candidates at the 2021 Scottish Parliament election but won no seats.

The party voluntarily deregistered with the Electoral Commission in May 2022.

== History ==
=== Founding ===
All for Unity was founded as Alliance 4 Unity in July 2020 by George Galloway, a former Member of Parliament for the Labour Party (1987–2003) and Respect Party (2005–2010, 2012–2015), and a staunch opponent of Scottish independence. In the run up to the 2014 Scottish independence referendum, Galloway said, "I have always hated nationalism. My flag is red. I care nothing for either the Scottish or the British flags. I'm not interested in the commemoration of the 1314 Battle of Bannockburn—which this referendum is being timed to coincide with. The only valid grounds for nationalism is when there is national oppression by one nation over another—that is manifestly not true in Scotland. It is not an occupied country. It has never been an occupied country. It is complete hysterical nonsense to pretend otherwise." Galloway later campaigned for a "Leave" vote in the 2016 referendum on the United Kingdom's membership of the European Union and endorsed Nigel Farage as an MEP candidate for the 2019 European Parliament election.

=== Policies ===
Regarding the policies of the alliance, Galloway said, "We've got only one goal – to get the SNP out. If we don't get off this hamster wheel, this neverendum, we'll never have normal politics in Scotland. Everything will be down to grudge and division. We want a national unity government that will begin this task of returning normality to Scottish politics. I'm against the SNP more than I'm against anyone else. That doesn't mean I'm for anyone else." Whilst Galloway has generally been against the holding of a further independence referendum, he stated that one should only happen if pro-independence parties (e.g. the SNP and the Greens) obtained more than 50% of the popular vote at the 2021 Scottish Parliament election. At the election, the SNP, Greens and Alba Party achieved over 50% of the Regional vote (but not the Constituency vote).

In August 2020, one of the party's candidates, Jean Mathieson, was criticised for her vocal support for Tommy Robinson and her comments relating to the Black Lives Matter Movement. This led Green MSP Ross Greer to comment that "George Galloway and his band of racist misfits are an embarrassment to unionism." Galloway did not condemn the comments made, but emphasised the broad-based nature of his movement, and has always been clear that his express agreement with any policy/candidate begins and ends with opposition to Scottish independence.

=== Scottish Parliament election ===
Some, such as pro-union blogger Effie Deans, saw the new party as an important part of a strategy to combat the SNP at the 2021 election. Others also suggested that Galloway was the only person (apart from Ruth Davidson) who would be capable up against Nicola Sturgeon in a debate. In August 2020, the major pro-union parties (Labour, the Conservatives and the Liberal Democrats) all rejected the idea of an electoral pact led by Galloway, reluctant to even engage with the Alliance ahead of the election.

On 27 January 2021, an application for the party to be called "All for Unity" was rejected by the Electoral Commission due to incomplete paperwork. Nine days later; however, the party and its new name were both approved.

All for Unity's electoral candidates included UK Independence Party (UKIP) founder Alan Sked, independent Fife Councillor Linda Holt and writer Jamie Blackett, who was also the party's leader. At the election, All for Unity failed to win a single seat. On 2 November 2021, the Electoral Commission revealed that All for Unity's campaign spending totalled nearly £30,000.

=== Collapse and dissolution ===
On 1 March 2022, an internal party dispute emerged as Blackett disagreed with Galloway's decision to continue presenting The Mother of All Talk Shows on RT UK-linked channel Sputnik, following the Russian invasion of Ukraine. In a statement, Galloway said that the invasion was not "what I wanted to see", but blamed it on "pumping Ukraine full of NATO weapons".

In a series of tweets, Blackett wrote:

There have been questions about my and [All for Unity's] reaction to events in Ukraine. Personally I condemn Putin's illegal invasion and stand squarely behind the Prime Minister's efforts to support Ukraine. A4U does not have and never has had a foreign policy/defence view.

A4U was set up as a v broad alliance of people from across the political spectrum to counter separatism in Scotland. I do not speak for [George Galloway] and [he] does not speak for me on issues unrelated to Scottish domestic politics.

But I am aware that his view of events is very different from mine. I believe some of his comments have been wrong and counter-productive. And therefore, in order to make it absolutely clear that I disagree, our alliance is at an end.

In May 2022, All for Unity voluntarily deregistered with the Electoral Commission.

== Electoral history ==
=== Scottish Parliament ===
Election	Regional			Total seats	+/–	Rank	Government
Election	Votes	%	Seats	Total seats	+/–	Rank	Government
2021	23,299	0.9	0 / 56	0 / 129		7th	Not in parliament
