= Alick Buchanan-Smith =

Alick Buchanan-Smith may refer to:

- Alick Buchanan-Smith, Baron Balerno (1898–1984), British Army officer and scientist
- Alick Buchanan-Smith (politician) (1932–1991), his son, British Conservative Member of Parliament
