= Kincardine and Deeside (constituency) =

UK Parliament constituency (1983–1997)

- Former county constituency for the House of Commons

1983–1997
- Seats: one
- Created from: Angus North & Mearns, Aberdeen South and West Aberdeenshire
- Replaced by: West Aberdeenshire & Kincardine; Aberdeen South

Kincardine and Deeside was a county constituency represented in the House of Commons of the Parliament of the United Kingdom from 1983 until 1997. It was mainly replaced by West Aberdeenshire and Kincardine, apart from the parts of the seat within the borders of the City of Aberdeen district, which joined Aberdeen South.

== Boundaries ==
Kincardine and Deeside District, and the City of Aberdeen District electoral divisions of Auchinyell, Craigton, Kincorth, and Peterculter.

== Members of Parliament ==
Election	Member	Party	Notes
1983	Alick Buchanan-Smith	Conservative	Previously MP for Angus North and Mearns from 1964. Died August 1991
1991 by-election	Nicol Stephen	Liberal Democrats	
1992	George Kynoch	Conservative	
1997	constituency abolished		

== Elections ==
=== Elections of the 1980s ===
General election 1983: Kincardine and Deeside
Party	Candidate	Votes	%	±%
Conservative	Alick Buchanan-Smith	20,293	47.7	+3.6
Liberal	Alexander Waugh	12,497	29.4	+15.6
Labour	Morag Morell	6,472	15.2	−7.6
SNP	Austin Tuttle	3,297	7.7	−11.6
Majority		7,796	18.3	
Turnout		45,559	71.5	
Conservative win (new seat)				

General election 1987: Kincardine and Deeside
Party	Candidate	Votes	%	±%
Conservative	Alick Buchanan-Smith	19,438	40.7	−7.0
Liberal	Nicol Stephen	17,375	36.3	+6.9
Labour	Jurgen Thomaneck	7,624	15.9	+0.7
SNP	Frances Duncan	3,082	6.5	−1.2
Green	Louise Perica	299	0.6	New
Majority		2,063	4.4	−13.9
Turnout		47,818	75.2	+3.7
Conservative hold		Swing	−3.3	

=== Elections of the 1990s ===
By-election 1991: Kincardine and Deeside
Party	Candidate	Votes	%	±%
Liberal Democrats	Nicol Stephen	20,779	49.0	+12.7
Conservative	Marcus Humphrey	12,955	30.6	−10.1
SNP	Allan Macartney	4,705	11.1	+4.6
Labour	Malcolm Savidge	3,271	7.7	−8.2
Green	Stephen Campbell	683	1.6	+1.0
Majority		7,824	18.4	N/A
Turnout		43,587	67.0	−8.2
Liberal Democrats gain from Conservative		Swing	+11.4	

General election 1992: Kincardine and Deeside
Party	Candidate	Votes	%	±%
Conservative	George Kynoch	22,924	43.7	+3.0
Liberal Democrats	Nicol Stephen	18,429	35.1	−1.2
SNP	Allan Macartney	5,927	11.3	+4.8
Labour	Malcolm Savidge	4,795	9.1	−6.8
Green	Stephen Campbell	381	0.7	+0.1
Majority		4,495	8.6	+4.2
Turnout		52,456	79.3	+4.1
Conservative hold		Swing	+2.1	
