= Mary Drummond Corsar =

Scottish activist and philanthropist (1927–2020)

The Honorable Dame Mary Drummond Corsar DBE
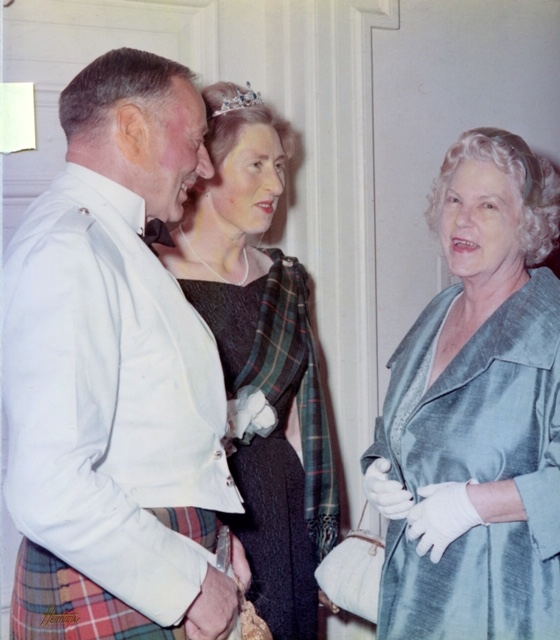
- Mary Drummond Corsar (centre)

Chairwoman of the Women's Royal Voluntary Service
- In office 1988–1993
- Monarch: Elizabeth II

Personal details
- Born: Mary Drummond Buchanan-Smith; 8 July 1927 Midlothian, Scotland
- Died: 6 August 2020 (aged 93)
- Citizenship: United Kingdom
- Spouse: Charles Corsar (m. 1953; died 2012)
- Education: Edinburgh University

Dame Mary Drummond Corsar, DBE (née Buchanan-Smith; 8 July 1927 – 12 August 2020), was a Scottish activist and philanthropist. She was chairperson of the Women’s Royal Voluntary Service from 1988 to 1993 and noted for modernising the organisation. She is also noted for the role she played in coordinating the emergency response to the Lockerbie bombing. Corsar was appointed Dame Commander of the Order of the British Empire (DBE) in 1993.

She was born 8 July 1927, as Mary Drummond Buchanan-Smith, daughter of the Life-Peer Lord Balerno, soldier and geneticist, who was Deputy Chairman of the Unionist Party in Scotland 1960-63. Her mother was the former Mary Kathleen Smith. She died in 1947. The Scottish Conservative politician, Alick Buchanan-Smith, was her brother.

She married 25 April 1953, Colonel Charles Herbert Kenneth Corsar, LVO, OBE, TD (1926-2012), Vice Lord-Lieutenant of the District of Midlothian 1993-97, by whom she had issue, two sons and three daughters. She lived at Ulva Ferry near Torloisk House, Isle of Mull.
