= Angus North and Mearns =

Angus North and Mearns may refer to:

- Angus North and Mearns (Scottish Parliament constituency), 2011–present
- North Angus and Mearns (UK Parliament constituency), 1950–1983
