= George Kynoch (Kincardine and Deeside MP) =

British politician (born 1946)

George Alexander Bryson Kynoch OBE (born 7 October 1946), is a Scottish Conservative politician.

At the 1992 general election, he was elected as MP for Kincardine and Deeside, defeating the Liberal Democrat Nicol Stephen, who had gained the seat at a by-election in 1991. From 1995 to 1997, he was a junior Scottish Office minister.

Kynoch's seat was abolished in boundary changes for the 1997 general election; he contested the new seat of Aberdeenshire West and Kincardine but lost to the Liberal Democrat Sir Robert Smith.

Since 1997, Kynoch has held several non-executive director positions in AIM-listed and private companies.

In May 2008, Kynoch was elected as Deputy Chairman of the Scottish Conservatives. He was re-elected in 2010 and held office till 2012.

Kynoch was appointed Officer of the Order of the British Empire (OBE) in the 2013 New Year Honours, for public and political service.

== Footnotes ==
Parliament of the United Kingdom
Preceded by Nicol Stephen	Member of Parliament for Kincardine and Deeside; 1992 – 1997	Constituency abolished
Political offices
Preceded by James Douglas-Hamilton; Allan Stewart; Hector Monro	Under-Secretary of State for Scotland; 1995 – 1997; With: Lord Lindsay; Raymond Robertson	Succeeded by Sam Galbraith; Lord Sewel; Malcolm Chisholm
