= Nicol Stephen =

British politician (born 1960)

The Right Honourable The Lord Stephen
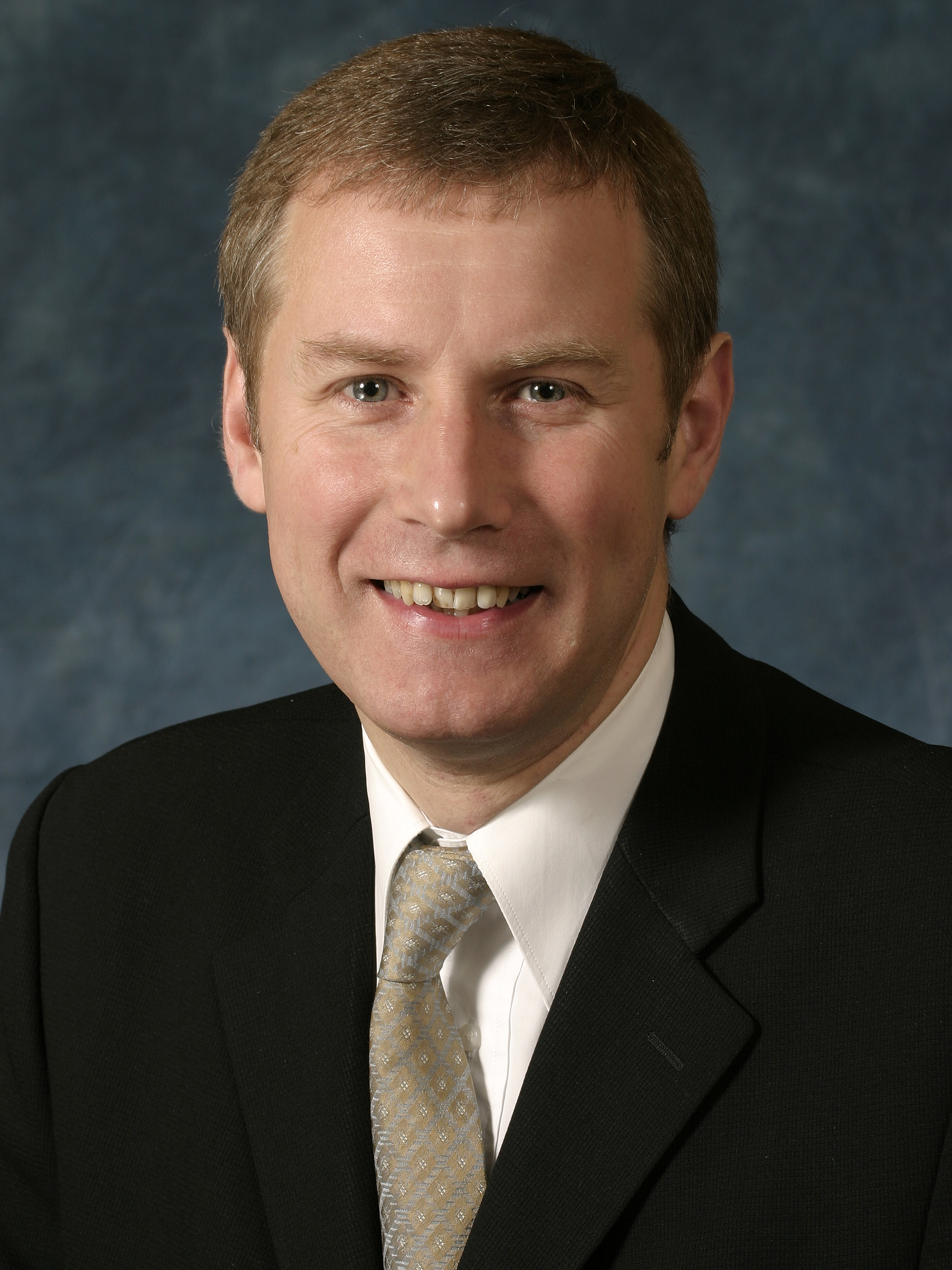
- Official portrait, 2003

Deputy First Minister of Scotland
- In office 27 June 2005 – 17 May 2007
- First Minister: Jack McConnell
- Preceded by: Jim Wallace
- Succeeded by: Nicola Sturgeon
Ministerial offices
Minister for Enterprise and Lifelong Learning
In office 27 June 2005 – 17 May 2007
First Minister	Jack McConnell
Preceded by	Jim Wallace
Succeeded by	Office abolished
Minister for Transport and Telecommunications
In office 21 May 2003 – 27 June 2005
First Minister	Jack McConnell
Preceded by	Office established
Succeeded by	Tavish Scott
Parliamentary offices
Member of the House of Lords
Lord Temporal
Life peerage 2 February 2011
Member of the Scottish Parliament for Aberdeen South
In office 6 May 1999 – 22 March 2011
Preceded by	Constituency established
Succeeded by	Constituency abolished
Member of Parliament for Kincardine and Deeside
In office 7 November 1991 – 16 March 1992
Preceded by	Alick Buchanan-Smith
Succeeded by	George Kynoch

Leader of Scottish Liberal Democrats
- In office 23 June 2005 – 2 July 2008
- Deputy: Michael Moore
- Leader: Charles Kennedy; Menzies Campbell; Vince Cable (Acting); Nick Clegg
- President: Malcolm Bruce
- Preceded by: Jim Wallace
- Succeeded by: Tavish Scott (Note: Michael Moore acted from 2 July to 26 August 2008.)

Personal details
- Born: Nicol Ross Stephen; 23 March 1960 (age 66) Aberdeen, Scotland
- Party: Scottish Liberal Democrats
- Spouse: Caris Doig (Lady Stephen)
- Children: 4
- Education: University of Aberdeen, University of Edinburgh

Nicol Ross Stephen, Baron Stephen (born 23 March 1960) is a Scottish politician who served as Deputy First Minister of Scotland and Minister for Enterprise and Lifelong Learning from 2005 to 2007. A member of the Scottish Liberal Democrats, he was the Member of the Scottish Parliament (MSP) for Aberdeen South from 1999 to 2011, and was leader of the Scottish Liberal Democrats from 2005 to 2008.

Stephen was elected to the Scottish Parliament in 1999. Following the coalition agreement between the Scottish Liberal Democrats and Scottish Labour, he became Deputy Minister for Enterprise and Lifelong Learning. Later in the same parliamentary term he became Deputy Minister for Education, Europe and External Affairs, and then for Education and Young People. Following the 2003 Scottish Parliament election, he joined the Scottish Executive cabinet as Minister for Transport.

In 2005, following the resignation of his predecessor Jim Wallace, Stephen was elected leader of the party and also became deputy first minister and Minister for Enterprise and Lifelong Learning. He led his party into the 2007 election, where it won 16 seats (down one on 2003). He resigned as party leader on 2 July 2008, triggering a leadership election. In 2011 he joined the House of Lords. He became a patron of The Aberdeen Law Project in 2011.

== Background and family life ==
Born in Aberdeen, he was educated at Robert Gordon's College in Aberdeen and at the University of Aberdeen, where he obtained an LLB in 1980. He then took his Diploma in Legal Practice at the University of Edinburgh School of Law and worked for a number of years as a solicitor before moving into corporate finance as a senior manager with Deloitte & Touche.

He was a former Chair of CREATE (a group campaigning for rail electrification between Aberdeen and Edinburgh); a chairperson of STAR (Save Tor-na-Dee Hospital and Roxburghe House); and the founder and director of Grampian Enterprise.

He is married with 4 children.

== Early political career ==
He was elected to Grampian Regional Council in 1982 (as Scotland's youngest councillor) and was Chair of Grampian's Economic Development and Planning Committee from 1986 to 1991.

He was briefly a Member of Parliament for the Kincardine and Deeside constituency, elected in the November 1991 by-election following the death of Conservative and Unionist Alick Buchanan-Smith. He was a member of the Liberal Democrat treasury team and spokesperson on small business during his time in the House of Commons. The seat returned to the Conservative and Unionist party at the 1992 general election, when it was won by George Kynoch.

He later stood for the Aberdeen South constituency in the 1997 election for Aberdeen South, but was defeated by the Scottish Labour candidate.

== Scottish Parliament ==
=== Minister and Deputy Minister roles ===
Nicol Stephen was elected as MSP for Aberdeen South in the first elections to the Scottish Parliament. He later helped negotiate the Partnership Agreement for the coalition government with the Labour Party.

He later served in the Scottish Executive as Deputy Minister for Enterprise and Lifelong Learning (1999 to 2000), then as Deputy Minister for Education, Europe and External Affairs (2000 to 2001), and as Deputy Minister for Education and Young People (2001 to 2003).

Following the 2003 election, he was appointed Minister for Transport. During his time in this post, he was responsible for approving the controversial M74 extension.

=== Deputy First Minister ===
Following the resignation of Jim Wallace in May 2005 as leader of the Scottish Liberal Democrats, Nicol Stephen announced his intention to stand for the leadership. He defeated rival candidate, Mike Rumbles, who advocated ending the coalition agreement with the Scottish Labour Party, winning 76.6%, becoming party leader on 23 June 2005. Four days later on 27 June 2005, he was appointed Deputy First Minister of Scotland. Following his leadership victory, a mini-reshuffle of the Scottish Cabinet, saw him take on the role of Minister for Enterprise and Lifelong Learning.

=== Opposition ===
Following the 2007 general election, the SNP emerged as the largest party by one seat but short of an overall majority, they held discussions with the Scottish Green Party and also intimated that it would be open to discussions with the Liberal Democrats. However, since the Liberal Democrats had indicated that they would not enter discussions with parties which continued to favour a referendum on independence, no formal talks were held. The SNP became a minority administration and officially entered government on 17 May 2007; Nicol Stephen ceased to be Deputy First Minister and began led his party to the opposition benches.

Despite being out of government, his party worked with the SNP Government on certain issues where they broadly agreed, including replacing the Council Tax with a local income tax to fund a proportion of local government revenue. He developed a reputation among some journalists as an effective and forceful critic of some aspects of the Scottish Government's policy and performance, especially at First Minister's Question Time.

Along with Wendy Alexander and Annabel Goldie, he took his party into the Commission on Scottish Devolution chaired by Sir Kenneth Calman, but was opposed to any suggestion that this would result in powers of the Parliament being returned to Westminster.

=== Resignation as party leader ===
On 2 July 2008, Nicol Stephen announced he was stepping down as party leader with immediate effect because of the pressures of leading a political party while having a young family based in Aberdeen, some distance from Parliament in Edinburgh. Nicol Stephen's resignation took many in Scottish politics by surprise, and came only four days after the resignation of the former leader of Labour in the Scottish Parliament, Wendy Alexander. He was succeeded by Tavish Scott.

On 24 September 2010, Nicol Stephen announced he would not be standing again at the Scottish elections in May 2011.

== House of Lords ==
On 2 February 2011, he was created a life peer as Baron Stephen, of Lower Deeside in the City of Aberdeen, and was introduced in the House of Lords on 7 February 2011, where he sits on the Liberal Democrat benches. He said he would use his new position to help reform the House of Lords.

== Career outside politics ==
Following his resignation as leader of the Scottish Liberal Democrats, Nicol Stephen co-founded Scottish renewable energy company Renewable Energy Ventures Ltd, and he was responsible for the development of several onshore wind projects.

In 2013, Nicol Stephen started work to develop the Kincardine Offshore Windfarm, located 15 km off the coast of Aberdeenshire, which became the world’s largest floating windfarm when completed in 2021. Construction began on the 50 MW windfarm in 2017, and the project started generating power in 2018. He remains a director of Kincardine Offshore Windfarm.

In 2018, Nicol Stephen founded Flotation Energy, building on the previous experience of the team that developed the Kincardine Offshore Windfarm and other renewables projects. Flotation Energy currently employs more than 150 staff, developing major offshore projects in the UK, Europe and Asia-Pacific.

In November 2022, Flotation Energy was acquired by TEPCO Renewable Power, part of the Tokyo Electric Power Company, with Nicol Stephen remaining at the company as Chief Executive Officer.

== See also ==
- List of United Kingdom MPs with the shortest service

== Notes ==
Parliament of the United Kingdom
Preceded by Alick Buchanan-Smith	Member of Parliament for Kincardine and Deeside; 1991–1992	Succeeded by George Kynoch
Scottish Parliament
New constituency	Member of the Scottish Parliament for Aberdeen South; 1999–2011	Constituency Abolished
Political offices
Preceded by Jim Wallace	Deputy First Minister of Scotland; 2005–2007	Succeeded by Nicola Sturgeon
Preceded by Jim Wallace	Minister for Enterprise and Lifelong Learning; 2005–2007	Office Abolished
New office	Minister for Transport; 2003–2005	Succeeded by Tavish Scott
New office	Deputy Minister for Education and Young People; 2001–2003	Succeeded by Euan Robson
Preceded by Peter Peacock	Deputy Minister for Education, Europe and External Affairs; 2000–2001	Office Abolished
New office	Deputy Minister for Enterprise and Lifelong Learning; 1999–2000	Succeeded by Alasdair Morrison
Party political offices
Preceded by Jim Wallace	Leader of the Scottish Liberal Democrats; 2005–2008	Succeeded by Tavish Scott
Orders of precedence in the United Kingdom
Preceded by The Lord Storey	Gentlemen; Baron Stephen	Followed by The Lord Glasman
