= James Scott (Liberal politician) =

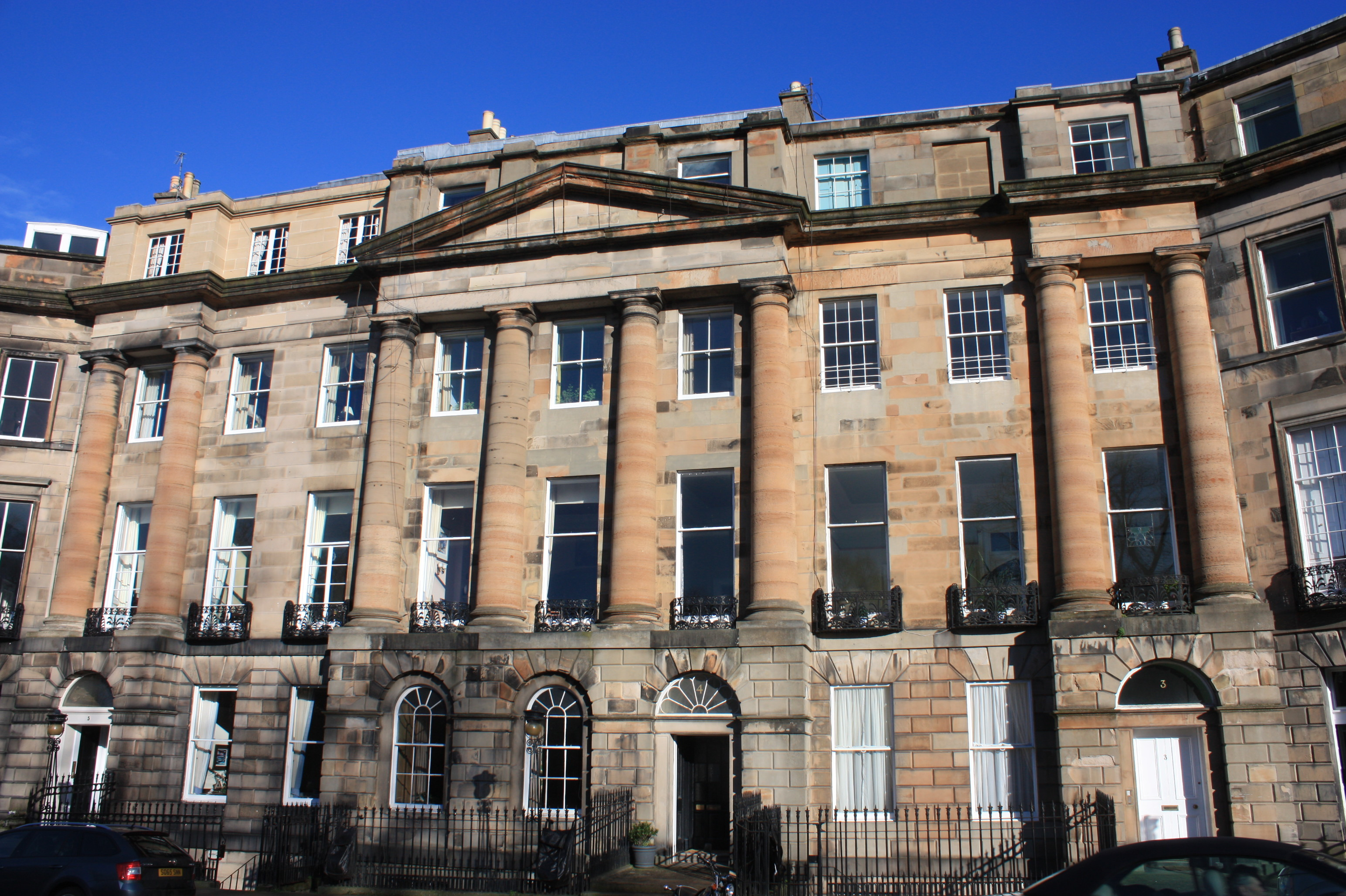
Scott's house (left) at 5 Moray Place, Edinburgh

James Scott (8 March 1876 – 30 October 1939) was a Scottish lawyer and Liberal Party politician.

== Family and education ==
James Scott was the son of a railway superintendent from Forres, also named James Scott. He was educated at Forres Academy and at the University of Edinburgh and the University of London. In 1910 he married Georgina Bowman Geddes from Buckhaven in Fife and they had two sons.

== Career ==
Scott was a solicitor to the Supreme Courts of Scotland and a notary public and was a partner in the firm of Mssrs. Robert Stewart and Scott of Edinburgh. He also served on a number of important Scottish public bodies. He was a member of the Game and Heather Burning Committee in 1921; a deputy chairman for Trade Boards for Jute, Flax, and Made-up Textiles, 1921–24; Vice-president and Trustee of the Scottish Rural Workers Approved Society and founder of the Scottish National Union of Allotment-holders.

== Politics ==
Scott contested Moray and Nairn as a Liberal at the 1922 general election and West Renfrewshire in 1923. In October 1924 he unsuccessfully fought Kincardine and West Aberdeen but was eventually elected to the House of Commons at the 1929 general election when he gained Kincardine and West Aberdeen by the narrow majority of 668 votes beating the sitting Unionist MP C M Barclay-Harvey. In 1931 he served as Parliamentary Private Secretary to the Secretary of State for Scotland, Sir Archie Sinclair in the National Government. At the 1931 general election Barclay-Harvey won the seat back in a straight fight with Scott. Although the Liberal Party had agreed to support the National Government of Ramsay MacDonald at the 1931 general election, with some reservations over the traditional Liberal policy of Free Trade, neither Scott nor Barclay-Harvey contested the election using the label National. Barclay-Harvey presumably did not feel he needed to stand aside for Scott, even though he was the sitting member of a party supporting the coalition – probably as the seat was closely contested and he knew he had a good chance of re-election and perhaps because Scott was known as a strong supporter of Free Trade.

== Putative by-election candidate ==
In 1934, Scott was selected as Liberal candidate for Perth. A by-election arose there in 1935 when Lord Scone, the sitting Tory MP, succeeded his father as Earl of Mansfield and Mansfield and went to the House of Lords. However at the eleventh hour, the local Liberal Association decided to select the then 76-year-old Francis Norie-Miller, (who had been the Liberal candidate at Perth at the 1931 general election) as they had been told that the Conservatives would be willing to support him as the National government candidate. The decision angered Liberal Party headquarters and they sent the Scottish Liberal Whip, Sir Robert Hamilton, to speak to a meeting of the local Association. The Association ungallantly refused to hear him however and Hamilton issued a statement saying how the decision struck at the very heart of Liberalism in Perth and throughout Scotland. Scott was also understandably unhappy. He said he would have been willing to step aside for Norie-Miller if he had been standing as a Liberal but he was trying to be loyal to a free and independent Liberal Party. In the end, supported in his decision by the party in London whose object was damage-limitation in clashes with the Simonite Liberal Nationals, Scott opted not to fight a hopeless cause and Norie-Miller, was elected as the Liberal National MP for Perth in the by-election of 16 April 1935. Perhaps significantly, Norie-Miller did not stand for re-election at the 1935 general election a few months later when the contest was a straight fight between Unionist and Labour candidates, resulting in a large Conservative majority.

Scott was next approached to stand at the Combined Scottish Universities by-election in January 1936 as an Independent Liberal. He declared he was willing to do so if sufficient support was forthcoming but clearly he felt this was not the case as he later announced he would not be standing. In the event, the election was won comfortably by former prime minister Ramsay MacDonald, the National Labour candidate.

== Death ==
Scott died suddenly at his home 5, Moray Place, Edinburgh on 30 October 1939.

== Publications ==
- Agriculture and Land Value Taxation: Three Papers (with F C R Douglas & A R McDougal), London 1930
- The Land Value Tax (notes on the application of the Act to Scotland) with H Samuels and P Fores, London 1931
- The Law of Smallholdings in Scotland, Edinburgh 1933

Parliament of the United Kingdom
Preceded by Malcolm Barclay-Harvey	Member of Parliament for Kincardine and Aberdeenshire West; 1929–1931	Succeeded by Malcolm Barclay-Harvey
