= Stuart Donaldson (Scottish politician) =

Scottish politician (born 1991)

Member of Parliament for West Aberdeenshire and Kincardine
- In office 7 May 2015 – 3 May 2017
- Preceded by: Robert Smith
- Succeeded by: Andrew Bowie

Personal details
- Born: Stuart Blair Donaldson; 5 September 1991 (age 35) Aberdeen, Scotland
- Party: Scottish National Party
- Education: University of Glasgow

Stuart Blair Donaldson (born 5 September 1991) is a Scottish National Party (SNP) former politician. He served as the Member of Parliament (MP) for West Aberdeenshire and Kincardine from the 2015 general election until being unseated at the general election on 8 June 2017, by Andrew Bowie of the Conservative Party.

== Early life ==
Donaldson was born in the north east of Scotland. He is the son of the former Scottish National Party Member of the Scottish Parliament (MSP) and Scottish Public Health Minister Maureen Watt. His grandfather Hamish Watt was also an SNP MP from 1974 to 1979. Donaldson was educated at Durris Primary School and Banchory Academy. He attended the University of Glasgow and graduated with an undergraduate Master of Arts (MA) degree in 2013.

== Political career ==
Following graduation, Donaldson worked as a parliamentary assistant for MSP Christian Allard.

At the 2015 general election, he was elected the Member of Parliament (MP) for West Aberdeenshire and Kincardine. He was 23 years, eight months and three days old at the time of his election, making him the second youngest Member of Parliament, behind fellow SNP MP Mhairi Black, who was 21. He was one of eight Scottish National Party MPs under 30.

Donaldson opposed austerity. In the 2016 United Kingdom European Union membership referendum, he backed the remain campaign. In Parliament, he argued Brexit would affect "lads holidays" in Europe. Donaldson voted against the triggering of Article 50.

He stood for re-election in the 2017 United Kingdom general election, but lost his seat to the Scottish Conservative candidate Andrew Bowie. Donaldson thus became a former MP at the age of only 25.

== Post-Parliament ==
In 2018, Donaldson joined the public affairs team of the Campaign for Real Ale, based at its head office in St Albans.

Parliament of the United Kingdom
Preceded by Robert Smith	Member of Parliament for West Aberdeenshire and Kincardine; 2015–2017	Succeeded by Andrew Bowie
