= 1939 Kincardineshire and Western Aberdeenshire by-election =

UK parliamentary by-election

A 1939 parliamentary by-election was held on 30 March 1939 for the British House of Commons constituency of Kincardine and Western Aberdeenshire.

== Vacancy ==
The Unionist MP for the constituency, Sir Malcolm Barclay-Harvey was appointed by the Prime Minister as Governor of South Australia, whereupon he resigned from the House of Commons on 8 March.

== Electoral history ==
The seat was created in 1918 and thereafter became a Unionist/Liberal marginal. The Labour Party had never fielded a candidate. Barclay-Harvey gained it from the Liberals in 1923, lost it to the Liberals in 1929 and won it back again in 1931. The seat was held at the last election with a reduced majority;

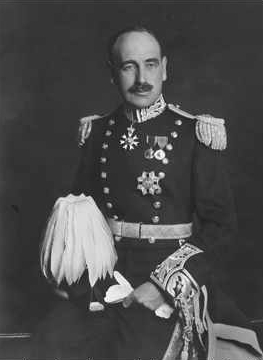
Sir Malcolm Barclay-Harvey

General election 1935: Kincardine & Western Aberdeenshire Electorate 29,528
| Party | Candidate | Votes | % | ±% |
|---|---|---|---|---|
| Unionist | Malcolm Barclay-Harvey | 12,477 | 55.9 | −5.7 |
| Liberal | Arthur Irvine | 9,841 | 44.1 | +5.7 |
| Majority | | 2,636 | 11.8 | −11.4 |
| Turnout | | 22,318 | 75.6 | −5.0 |
| Unionist hold | | Swing | | |

== Candidates ==
- Thirty-six-year-old Colin Thornton-Kemsley was chosen as the Unionist candidate to defend the seat. He was the Honorary Treasurer of Essex and Middlesex Provincial Area, National Union of Conservative and Unionist Associations. He was educated at Chigwell School, and Wadham College, Oxford. He was a party member in Epping constituency and had made a name for himself in Conservative Party circles as a Neville Chamberlain loyalist who was central to bringing about a censure of Winston Churchill by the Epping Conservative Association. He had no previous links with Scotland.
- The Liberal Party challenger was 30-year-old Arthur Irvine, who had fought this seat at the last election. Irvine was educated at Edinburgh Academy and Oriel College, Oxford, where he was president of the Oxford Union in 1932. He became a barrister in 1935, when he was called by Middle Temple, and became secretary to the Lord Chief Justice in 1935.

== Campaign ==
According to the return of election expenses, the Unionists spent £835 10s 7d on their campaign and the Liberals £652 5s 8d.

== Result ==
Thornton-Kemsley held the seat for the Unionist Party with a further reduced majority.

1939 Kincardineshire and West Aberdeenshire by-election Electorate
| Party | Candidate | Votes | % | ±% |
|---|---|---|---|---|
| Unionist | Colin Thornton-Kemsley | 11,111 | 52.7 | −3.2 |
| Liberal | Arthur Irvine | 9,990 | 47.3 | +3.2 |
| Majority | | 121 | 5.4 | −6.4 |
| Turnout | | 21,101 | 71.4 | −4.2 |
| Unionist hold | | Swing | -3.2 | |

== Aftermath ==
In the 1945 general election, there was a further small swing to the Liberals but Thornton-Kemsley hung on again against a new Liberal challenger;

General election 1945: Kincardineshire & Western Aberdeenshire Electorate 30,901
| Party | Candidate | Votes | % | ±% |
|---|---|---|---|---|
| Unionist | Colin Thornton-Kemsley | 10,932 | 51.5 | −1.2 |
| Liberal | John Junor | 10,290 | 48.5 | +1.2 |
| Majority | | 642 | 3.0 | −2.4 |
| Turnout | | 21,222 | 68.7 | −2.7 |
| Unionist hold | | Swing | -1.2 | |

Irvine left the Liberal Party and joined the Labour Party, being defeated in 1945 at Twickenham. Junor became a well-known journalist, and after standing for the Liberals on a further two occasions he left the party and quickly gravitated towards the reactionary right wing of the Conservative Party.
