= 1991 Kincardine and Deeside by-election =

1991 UK Parliamentary by-election

- 7 November 1991

Constituency of Kincardine and Deeside
- Turnout: 67.0% (▼8.2%)
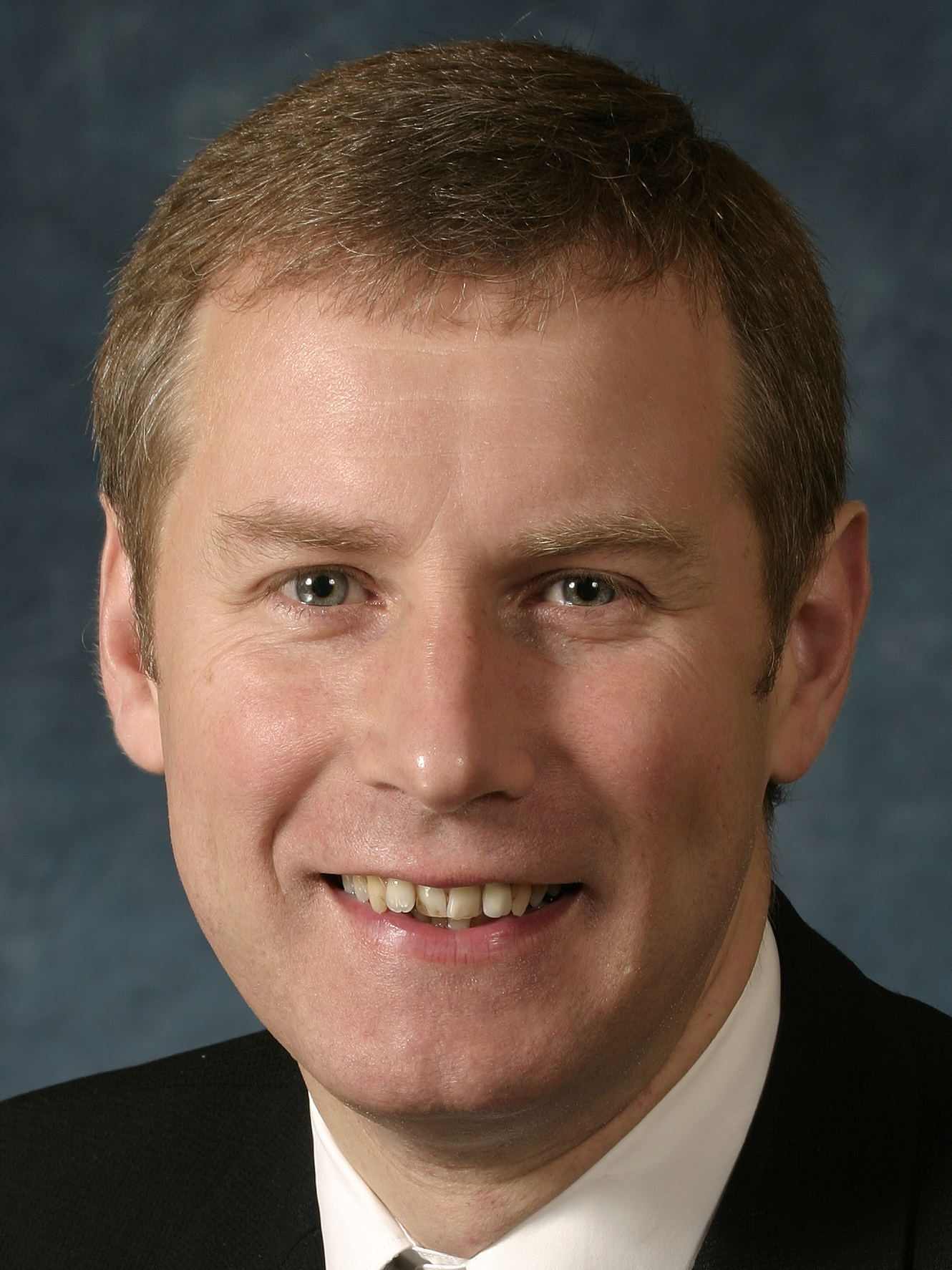

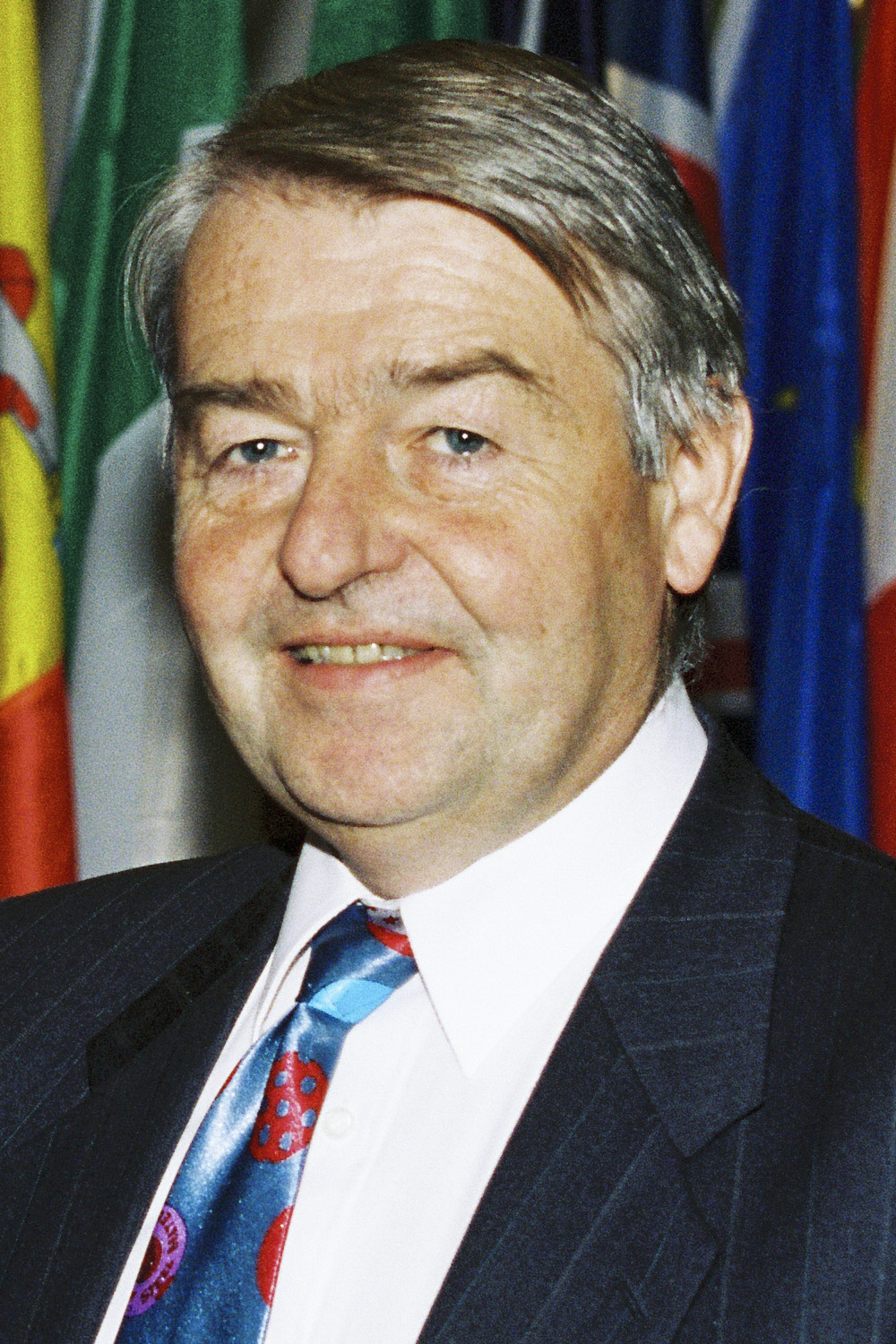
	First party	Second party
Candidate	Nicol Stephen	J. M. Marcus Humphrey
Party	Liberal Democrats	Conservative
Popular vote	20,779	12,955
Percentage	49.0%	30.6%
Swing	▲12.7%	▼10.1%
	Third party	Fourth party
Candidate	Allan Macartney	Malcolm Savidge
Party	SNP	Labour
Popular vote	4,705	3,271
Percentage	11.1%	7.7%
Swing	▲4.7%	▼8.2%
MP before election
Alick Buchanan-Smith
Conservative
Elected MP
Nicol Stephen
Liberal Democrats

The 1991 Kincardine and Deeside by-election was a UK parliamentary by-election held in Kincardine and Deeside, Scotland, on 7 November 1991, caused by the death of the Conservative member of parliament, Alick Buchanan-Smith on 29 August 1991.

The result was a gain for the Lib Dems from the Scottish Conservatives, with future party leader Nicol Stephen elected as the new Liberal Democrat Member of Parliament. Stephen held the seat until the 1992 general election, when it was regained by the Conservative Party. The SNP candidate Allan Macartney went on to be elected as the MEP for North East Scotland (European Parliament constituency) at the 1994 European Parliament election; a position he retained until his death in 1998. The Scottish Labour candidate, Malcolm Savidge, who finished in fourth place at this by-election, went on to be elected as the MP for Aberdeen North at the 1997 general election. Nicol Stephen was elected as Member of the Scottish Parliament for Aberdeen South in 1999 and became Leader of the Scottish Liberal Democrats in 2005.

It was held on the same day as the by-election in Langbaurgh, which saw another Conservative defeat.

== Result ==
1991 Kincardine and Deeside by-election
Party	Candidate	Votes	%	±%
Liberal Democrats	Nicol Stephen	20,779	49.0	+12.7
Conservative	Marcus Humphrey	12,955	30.6	−10.1
SNP	Allan Macartney	4,705	11.1	+4.7
Labour	Malcolm Savidge	3,271	7.7	−8.2
Green	Stephen Campbell	683	1.6	+1.0
Majority		7,824	18.4	N/A
Turnout		43,587	67.0	−8.2
Liberal Democrats gain from Conservative		Swing	+11.4	

== Previous result ==
General election 1987: Kincardine and Deeside
Party	Candidate	Votes	%	±%
Conservative	Alick Buchanan-Smith	19,438	40.7	−7.0
Liberal	Nicol Stephen	17,375	36.3	+6.9
Labour	Jurgen Thomaneck	7,624	15.9	+0.7
SNP	Frances Duncan	3,082	6.5	−1.2
Green	Louise Perica	299	0.6	New
Majority		2,063	4.4	−13.9
Turnout		47,818	75.2	+3.7
Conservative hold		Swing	−3.3	
