= West Aberdeenshire and Kincardine (UK Parliament constituency) =

UK Parliament constituency (since 1997)

Coordinates: 57.250°N 3.290°W

- County constituency for the House of Commons
- Boundary of West Aberdeenshire and Kincardine in Scotland
- Electorate: 73,364 (March 2020)
- Major settlements: Laurencekirk, Portlethen, Stonehaven, Banchory, Braemar

Current constituency
- Created: 1997
- Member of Parliament: Andrew Bowie (Conservative)
- Created from: Kincardine and Deeside

1918–1950
- Created from: Aberdeenshire Western and Kincardineshire
- Replaced by: West Aberdeenshire and North Angus and Mearns

West Aberdeenshire and Kincardine is a county constituency of the House of Commons of the Parliament of the United Kingdom of Great Britain and Northern Ireland (Westminster), which elects one Member of Parliament (MP) by the first past the post system of election. It was first used in the 1997 general election, but has undergone boundary changes since that date. The constituency was re-established in 1997, having previously existed as Kincardine and Western Aberdeenshire from 1918 to 1950.

The seat has been held since 2017 by Andrew Bowie of the Conservative Party.

There was also a Holyrood constituency of West Aberdeenshire and Kincardine in the Scottish Parliament from 1999 to 2011 with the same boundaries as the Westminster constituency at that time.

== Boundaries ==
Map of current boundaries

=== 1918–1950 ===
In 1868, the constituency of Aberdeenshire was divided into Aberdeenshire Eastern and Aberdeenshire Western divisions. These continued as constituencies until 1918, when the county of Aberdeenshire and the county of Kincardineshire were treated as if a single county for parliamentary representation purposes, with the area of the former Kincardineshire and Aberdeenshire constituencies being divided into three new constituencies, Aberdeen and Kincardine East, Aberdeen and Kincardine Central and Kincardine and Aberdeenshire West. In 1950 the Kincardineshire and Aberdeenshire counties were separated again, and a new boundary divided the Aberdeenshire area into East Aberdeenshire and West Aberdeenshire.

=== 1997–2005 ===
Kincardine and Deeside District, and the Gordon District electoral divisions of Donside and South Gordon.

=== 2005–present ===
Under the Fifth Review of UK Parliament constituencies of the Boundary Commission for Scotland, the constituency was defined as comprising the area of the Aberdeenshire Council other than those parts in the Banff and Buchan County Constituency and the Gordon County Constituency. Under the 2023 review of Westminster constituencies, which came into effect for the 2024 general election, the boundaries were unchanged.

Further to reviews of local government ward boundaries which came into effect in 2007 and 2017, but did not affect the parliamentary boundaries, the contents of the constituency are now defined as comprising the following Aberdeenshire Council wards and part wards:

- In full: Westhill and District, Aboyne, Upper Deeside and Donside, Banchory and Mid Deeside, North Kincardine, Stonehaven and Lower Deeside, Mearns.
- In part: West Garioch^{1} (minority, including Kemnay), East Garioch^{1} (minority, including Blackburn), Huntly, Strathbogie and Howe of Alford^{1} (minority, including Alford).

^{1} The boundary within these wards is equivalent to the boundary between the former Gordon constituency and the unchanged West Aberdeenshire and Kincardine constituency.

The constituency covers a southern portion of the Aberdeenshire council area and includes the towns of Stonehaven, Portlethen and Banchory, and stretches along the Dee river valley from Westhill to Braemar, and north to Kemnay in the Don river valley, which were part of the Gordon constituency until 2005.

To the northeast of West Aberdeenshire and Kincardine there are the constituencies of Aberdeen North and Aberdeen South, which are both entirely within the Aberdeen City area; to the north there is the new Gordon and Buchan constituency, which is entirely within the Aberdeenshire area; to the northeast lies the new Moray West, Nairn and Strathspey constituency; and to the south, the new Angus and Perthshire Glens constituency.

== Members of Parliament ==
=== 1918–1950 ===
Election	Member	Party
1918	Arthur Murray	Liberal
1923	Malcolm Barclay-Harvey	Unionist
1929	James Scott	Liberal
1931	Sir Malcolm Barclay-Harvey	Unionist
1939 by-election	Colin Thornton-Kemsley	Unionist
1950	constituency abolished	

=== 1997–present ===
Election	Member	Party
1997	Sir Robert Smith	Liberal Democrats
2015	Stuart Donaldson	SNP
2017	Andrew Bowie	Conservative

== Election results ==
=== Elections in the 2020s ===
General election 2024: West Aberdeenshire and Kincardine
Party	Candidate	Votes	%	±%
Conservative	Andrew Bowie	17,428	35.6	−7.1
SNP	Glen Reynolds	13,987	28.6	−12.5
Labour	Kate Blake	6,397	13.1	+8.5
Liberal Democrats	Michael Turvey	6,342	13.0	+1.3
Reform	Brandon Innes	3,497	7.1	N/A
Green	William Linegar	1,032	2.1	N/A
Independent	Iris Leask	219	0.4	N/A
Independent	David Neill	56	0.1	N/A
Majority		3,441	7.0	+5.4
Turnout		48,958	67.3	−6.1
Registered electors		72,994		
Conservative hold		Swing	+2.7	

=== Elections in the 2010s ===
General election 2019: West Aberdeenshire and Kincardine
Party	Candidate	Votes	%	±%
Conservative	Andrew Bowie	22,752	42.7	−5.2
SNP	Fergus Mutch	21,909	41.1	+8.6
Liberal Democrats	John Waddell	6,253	11.7	+3.1
Labour	Patrick Coffield	2,431	4.6	−6.5
Majority		843	1.6	−13.8
Turnout		53,345	73.4	+2.2
Conservative hold		Swing	−6.9	

General election 2017: West Aberdeenshire and Kincardine
Party	Candidate	Votes	%	±%
Conservative	Andrew Bowie	24,704	47.9	+19.1
SNP	Stuart Donaldson	16,754	32.5	−9.1
Labour	Barry Black	5,706	11.1	+6.6
Liberal Democrats	John Waddell	4,461	8.6	−12.8
Majority		7,950	15.4	N/A
Turnout		51,625	71.2	−4.0
Conservative gain from SNP		Swing	+14.1	

General election 2015: West Aberdeenshire and Kincardine
Party	Candidate	Votes	%	±%
SNP	Stuart Donaldson	22,949	41.6	+25.9
Conservative	Alexander Burnett	15,916	28.8	−1.5
Liberal Democrats	Robert Smith	11,812	21.4	−17.0
Labour	Barry Black	2,487	4.5	−9.1
UKIP	David Lansdell	1,006	1.8	+0.9
Green	Richard Openshaw	885	1.6	N/A
Independent	Graham Reid	141	0.3	N/A
Majority		7,033	12.8	N/A
Turnout		55,196	75.2	+6.8
SNP gain from Liberal Democrats		Swing	+21.5	

General election 2010: West Aberdeenshire and Kincardine
Party	Candidate	Votes	%	±%
Liberal Democrats	Robert Smith	17,362	38.4	−7.9
Conservative	Alex Johnstone	13,678	30.3	+1.9
SNP	Dennis Robertson	7,086	15.7	+4.4
Labour	Greg Williams	6,159	13.6	+0.5
BNP	Gary Raikes	513	1.1	N/A
UKIP	Anthony Atkinson	397	0.9	N/A
Majority		3,684	8.1	−9.8
Turnout		45,195	68.4	+4.9
Liberal Democrats hold		Swing	−4.9	

=== Elections in the 2000s ===
General election 2005: West Aberdeenshire and Kincardine
Party	Candidate	Votes	%	±%
Liberal Democrats	Robert Smith	19,285	46.3	+2.8
Conservative	Alex Johnstone	11,814	28.4	−2.4
Labour	James Barrowman	5,470	13.1	+0.8
SNP	Caroline Little	4,700	11.3	−0.9
Scottish Socialist	Lorna Grant	379	0.9	−0.2
Majority		7,471	17.9	+5.2
Turnout		41,648	63.5	+1.5
Liberal Democrats hold		Swing		

General election 2001: West Aberdeenshire and Kincardine
Party	Candidate	Votes	%	±%
Liberal Democrats	Robert Smith	16,507	43.5	+2.4
Conservative	Thomas Kerr	11,686	30.8	−4.1
Labour	Kevin Hutchens	4,669	12.3	+3.2
SNP	John Green	4,634	12.2	−0.9
Scottish Socialist	Alan Manley	418	1.1	N/A
Majority		4,821	12.7	+6.5
Turnout		37,914	62.0	−11.1
Liberal Democrats hold		Swing	+3.3	

=== Elections in the 1990s ===
General election 1997: West Aberdeenshire and Kincardine
Party	Candidate	Votes	%	±%
Liberal Democrats	Robert Smith	17,742	41.1	+6.4
Conservative	George Kynoch	15,080	34.9	−10.2
SNP	Joy Mowatt	5,649	13.1	+0.6
Labour	Qaisra Khan	3,923	9.1	+2.3
Referendum	Steve Ball	808	1.9	N/A
Majority		2,662	6.2	N/A
Turnout		43,202	73.1	N/A
Liberal Democrats win (new seat)				

=== Elections in the 1940s ===
General election 1945: Kincardine & Western Aberdeenshire
Party	Candidate	Votes	%	±%
Unionist	Colin Thornton-Kemsley	10,932	51.5	−4.4
Liberal	John Junor	10,290	48.5	+4.4
Majority		642	3.0	−8.8
Turnout		21,222	68.7	−6.9
Unionist hold		Swing	-4.4	

=== Elections in the 1930s ===
1939 Kincardineshire and Western Aberdeenshire by-election
Party	Candidate	Votes	%	±%
Unionist	Colin Thornton-Kemsley	11,111	52.7	−3.2
Liberal	Arthur Irvine	9,990	47.3	+3.2
Majority		1,121	5.4	−6.4
Turnout		21,101	71.4	−4.2
Unionist hold		Swing	-3.2	

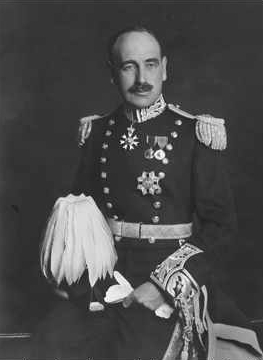
Barclay-Harvey

General election 1935: Kincardine & Western Aberdeenshire
Party	Candidate	Votes	%	±%
Unionist	Malcolm Barclay-Harvey	12,477	55.9	−5.7
Liberal	Arthur Irvine	9,841	44.1	+5.7
Majority		2,636	11.8	−11.4
Turnout		22,318	75.6	−5.0
Unionist hold		Swing		

General election 1931: Kincardine & Western Aberdeenshire
Party	Candidate	Votes	%	±%
Unionist	Malcolm Barclay-Harvey	14,266	61.6	+13.4
Liberal	James Scott	8,890	38.4	−13.4
Majority		5,376	23.2	N/A
Turnout		23,156	80.6	+14.3
Unionist gain from Liberal		Swing		

=== Elections in the 1920s ===
General election 1929: Kincardine & Western Aberdeenshire
Party	Candidate	Votes	%	±%
Liberal	James Scott	9,839	51.8	+6.3
Unionist	Malcolm Barclay-Harvey	9,171	48.2	−6.3
Majority		668	3.6	N/A
Turnout		19,010	66.3	−1.0
Liberal gain from Unionist		Swing	+6.3	

General election 1924: Kincardine & Western Aberdeenshire
Party	Candidate	Votes	%	±%
Unionist	Malcolm Barclay-Harvey	8,260	54.5	+3.5
Liberal	James Scott	6,889	45.5	−3.5
Majority		1,371	9.0	+7.0
Turnout		15,149	67.3	+5.5
Unionist hold		Swing		

General election 1923: Aberdeenshire West & Kincardine
Party	Candidate	Votes	%	±%
Unionist	Malcolm Barclay-Harvey	6,639	51.0	New
Liberal	Hon. Arthur Murray	6,369	49.0	−12.3
Majority		270	2.0	N/A
Turnout		13,008	57.8	+13.2
Unionist gain from Liberal		Swing		

Arthur Murray

General election 1922: Kincardine & Western Aberdeenshire
Party	Candidate	Votes	%	±%
Liberal	Hon. Arthur Murray	6,224	62.3	N/A
National Liberal	William Mitchell	3,767	37.7	N/A
Majority		2,457	24.6	N/A
Turnout		9,991	44.6	N/A
Liberal hold		Swing	N/A	

=== Elections in the 1910s ===
Arthur Murray

General election 1918: Kincardine & Western Aberdeenshire
Party		Candidate	Votes	%
C	Liberal	Arthur Murray	Unopposed	
	Liberal win (new seat)			
C indicates candidate endorsed by the coalition government.

== See also ==
- West Aberdeenshire and Kincardine (Scottish Parliament constituency)
