= Malcolm Barclay-Harvey =

British politician and Governor of South Australia

Sir Malcolm Barclay-Harvey KCMG
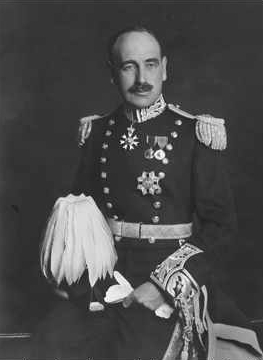
- Barclay-Harvey in 1939

22nd Governor of South Australia
- In office 12 August 1939 – 26 April 1944
- Monarch: George VI
- Premier: Sir Thomas Playford
- Preceded by: Lord Dugan
- Succeeded by: Sir Willoughby Norrie

Member of Parliament for Kincardine and Aberdeenshire West
- In office 27 October 1931 – 8 March 1939
- Preceded by: James Scott
- Succeeded by: Colin Thornton-Kemsley
- In office 6 December 1923 – 10 May 1929
- Preceded by: Arthur Murray
- Succeeded by: James Scott

Personal details
- Born: 2 March 1890 London, England
- Died: 17 November 1969 (aged 79) London, England

Sir Charles Malcolm Barclay-Harvey, KCMG (2 March 1890 – 17 November 1969) was a British politician and Governor of South Australia from 12 August 1939 until 26 April 1944.

== Biography ==
The only child of James Charles Barclay-Harvey, of Dinnet House, Aberdeenshire, he was educated at Eton and at Christ Church, Oxford, and served in the 7th (Deeside Highland) Battalion of the Gordon Highlanders from 1909 to 1915, with the Home Staff from 1915 to 1916, with the Ministry of Munitions in London from 1916 to 1918 and in Paris from 1918 to 1919.

Barclay-Harvey was adopted as prospective Unionist candidate for East Aberdeenshire in 1914 and was Member of Parliament (MP) for Kincardine and Aberdeenshire West from 1923 to 1929 and from 1931 to 1939. He was Parliamentary Private Secretary to Sir John Gilmour from 1924 to 1929 and to Sir Godfrey Collins from 1932 to 1936, and was knighted in the 1936 Birthday Honours, for "political and public services".

He was married firstly, in 1912, to Margaret Joan, daughter of Henry de la Poer Beresford Heywood, of Wrentnall House, Shrewsbury, by whom he had a daughter. He married secondly, in 1938, to a widow, Lady Muriel Felicia Vere Liddell-Grainger, daughter of the 12th Earl of Lindsey, becoming stepfather of David Liddell-Grainger.

He was Honorary Colonel of the 4th Battalion of the Gordon Highlanders from 1939 to 1945, and was a Member of Aberdeen County Council from 1945 to 1955. He was a member of the Royal Company of Archers.

He was appointed the Governor of South Australia in March 1939, whereupon he resigned from the House of Commons on 8 March and was appointed KCMG. He, his wife and two stepchildren then moved to Adelaide. He took office on 12 August, shortly before the outbreak of World War II. His principal focus during his tenure was the war effort. His wife, Lady Muriel, founded the Lady Muriel Nurses' Club for servicewomen, and made a habit of visiting numerous Red Cross branches. She also opened the Pioneer Women's Memorial Gardens in Adelaide on 19 April 1941 and launched the corvette HMAS Whyalla, the first ship from the World War II shipyard at Whyalla on 12 May 1941. He was also a Freemason. During his term as Governor (1939–1944), he was also Grand Master of the Grand Lodge of South Australia.

The Vice-Regal couple spent as much time as they could at the Vice Regal Summer Residence at Marble Hill, where they restored the gardens. An avid railway enthusiast, he also had a large-scale outdoor model railway installed there, and in 1943 the South Australian Railways new steam locomotive class South Australian Railways 520 class number 520 was named after him.

He retired from the Vice-Regal post for health reasons on 26 April 1944, whereupon he returned to his 14,000-acre (57 km^{2}) Scottish estate which he had inherited in 1924. He served as deputy lieutenant of Aberdeenshire (1945), a member of the Aberdeenshire City Council (1945–55) and Grand Master of the Grand Lodge of Scotland (1949–53). He wrote A History of the Great North of Scotland Railway, which was published in 1940 by Locomotive Publishing Company with a second edition in 1949, and a subsequent reprint by Ian Allan Publishing in 1998. He was a Knight of the Order of St John.

== Death ==
Sir Charles Malcolm Barclay-Harvey died in London on 17 November 1969, aged 79.

Parliament of the United Kingdom
Preceded by Arthur Murray	Member of Parliament for Kincardine and Aberdeenshire West; 1923–1929	Succeeded by James Scott
Preceded by James Scott	Member of Parliament for Kincardine and Aberdeenshire West; 1931–1939	Succeeded by Colin Thornton-Kemsley
Government offices
Preceded by Sir Winston Dugan	Governor of South Australia; 1939–1944	Succeeded by Sir Willoughby Norrie
Masonic offices
Preceded by The Earl of Galloway	Grand Master of the Grand Lodge of Scotland; 1949–1953	Succeeded by The Lord Macdonald of Slate
