= Andrew Bowie =

Scottish politician (born 1987)

Andrew Bowie MP
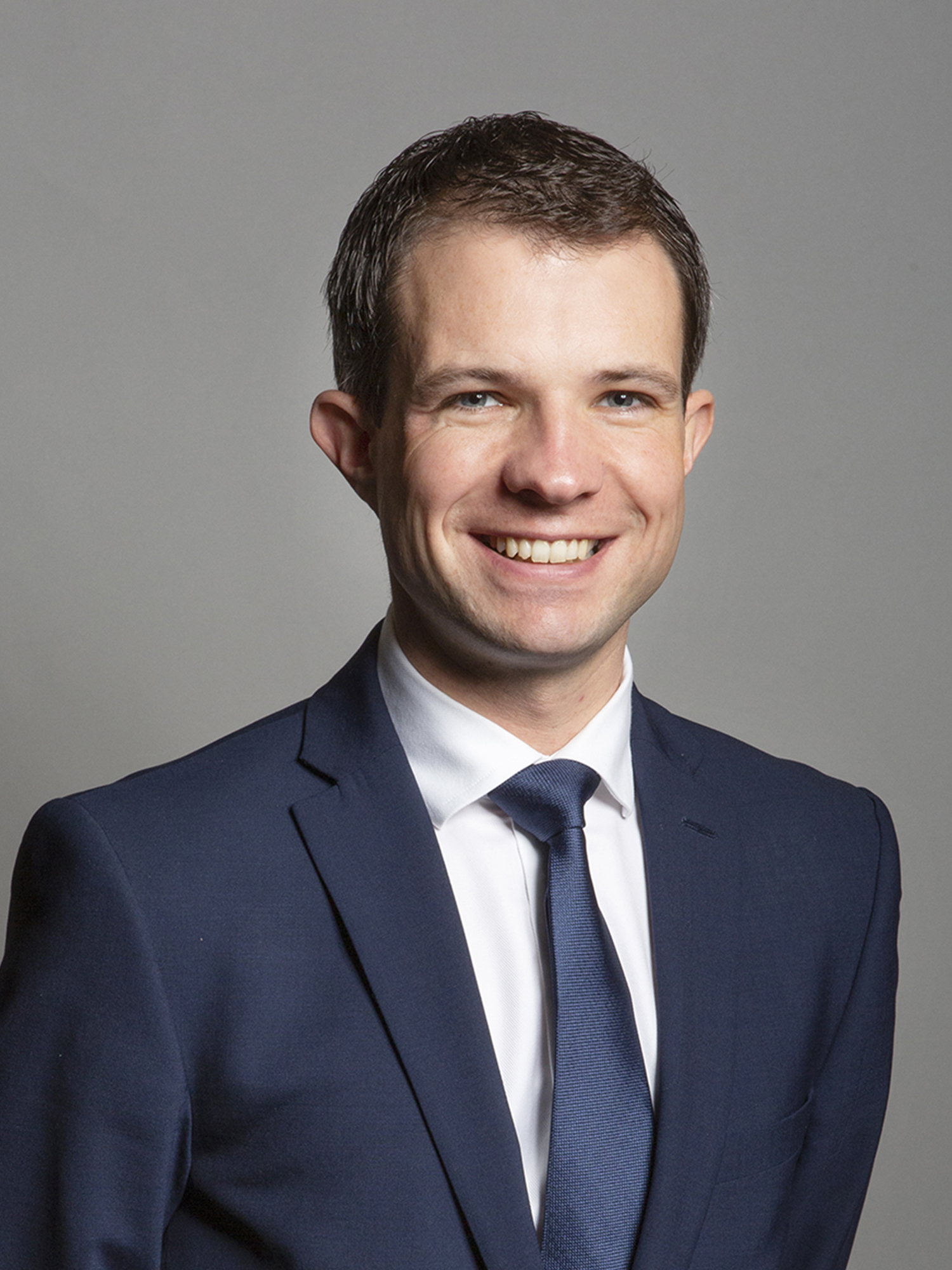
- Official portrait, 2019

Shadow Secretary of State for Energy Security and Net Zero
- Incumbent
- Assumed office 31 August 2026
- Leader: Kemi Badenoch
- Preceded by: Claire Coutinho

Shadow Secretary of State for Scotland
- In office 5 November 2024 – 31 August 2026
- Leader: Kemi Badenoch
- Preceded by: John Lamont
- Succeeded by: Harriet Cross

Shadow Minister for Energy Security and Net Zero
- In office 19 July 2024 – 31 August 2026
- Leader: Rishi Sunak; Kemi Badenoch
- Preceded by: Alan Whitehead
- Succeeded by: Harriet Cross

Shadow Minister for Veterans
- In office 8 July 2024 – 5 November 2024
- Leader: Rishi Sunak
- Preceded by: Steve McCabe
Junior ministerial and party offices
Parliamentary Under-Secretary of State for Nuclear and Renewables (Note: As Parliamentary Under-Secretary of State for Nuclear and Networks until January 2024)
In office 7 February 2023 – 5 July 2024
Prime Minister	Rishi Sunak
Preceded by	Office established
Succeeded by	Michael Shanks
Parliamentary Under-Secretary of State for Exports
In office 28 October 2022 – 7 February 2023
Prime Minister	Rishi Sunak
Preceded by	Marcus Fysh
Succeeded by	The Lord Offord of Garvel
Vice Chairman of the Conservative Party
In office 24 July 2019 – November 2021
Leader	Boris Johnson
Chair	James Cleverly; Ben Elliot; Amanda Milling; Oliver Dowden
Preceded by	Position established
Succeeded by	Bim Afolami
Parliamentary Private Secretary to the Prime Minister
In office 29 December 2018 – 24 July 2019
Prime Minister	Theresa May
Preceded by	Seema Kennedy
Succeeded by	Alex Burghart; Trudy Harrison

Member of Parliament for West Aberdeenshire and Kincardine
- Incumbent
- Assumed office 8 June 2017
- Preceded by: Stuart Donaldson
- Majority: 3,441 (7.0%)

Personal details
- Born: Andrew Campbell Bowie; 28 May 1987 (age 39) Arbroath, Scotland
- Party: Scottish Conservatives
- Spouse: Madeleine Clarke
- Children: 1
- Education: Britannia Royal Naval College; University of Aberdeen (MA)
- Website: www.andrewbowie.org.uk

Military service
- Allegiance: United Kingdom
- Branch/service: Royal Navy; Royal Naval Reserve
- Years of service: 2007–10; 2022–
- Rank: Sub-Lieutenant; Midshipman

Andrew Campbell Bowie (born 28 May 1987) is a Scottish Conservative politician who has been the Member of Parliament (MP) for West Aberdeenshire and Kincardine since 2017. He previously served as Parliamentary Under-Secretary of State for Nuclear and Networks from 2023 to 2024. He served as Shadow Secretary of State for Scotland from 2024 to August 2026, when he was appointed Shadow Secretary of State for Energy Security and Net Zero in the 2026 British shadow cabinet reshuffle.

== Early life and education ==
Andrew Bowie was born on 28 May 1987 in Arbroath. He spent his early childhood in Alford, before moving to Inverurie, and was educated at Market Place School and Inverurie Academy in Aberdeenshire. While studying at Inverurie Academy, Bowie was chosen to join the National Youth Orchestra of Scotland, playing the violin. After leaving school, he joined the Royal Navy and attended Britannia Royal Naval College before serving as an officer, remaining on the rank of Sub-Lieutenant.

After leaving the navy, Bowie studied History and Politics at the University of Aberdeen, where he was a member of the Aberdeen University Royal Naval Unit and where he was elected Chairman of the University of Aberdeen Conservative and Unionist Association for the 2012/13 academic year.

== Political career ==
After graduating from the University of Aberdeen, Bowie was employed as a Military Projects Coordinator for the Westhill-based diving equipment supplier Divex. Bowie left Divex in January 2014 to assume a post as the North Scotland Campaign Manager for the Scottish Conservatives, and was seconded to the Better Together campaign for the duration of the 2014 Scottish independence referendum.

Following the referendum, Bowie transitioned to parliamentary politics by serving as a senior advisor to the Conservative MEP Ian Duncan. Following the 2016 Scottish Parliament election, Bowie was hired as office manager to Liam Kerr, who was elected as the Scottish Conservative and Unionist MSP for the North East Scotland region. In 2016, while working for Kerr, he was forced to apologise to a female SNP councillor to whom he accidentally sent an offensive email.

== Parliamentary career ==
At the snap 2017 general election, Bowie was elected to Parliament as MP for West Aberdeenshire and Kincardine with 47.9% of the vote and a majority of 7,950.

From October 2017 until June 2018, he was a member of the Work and Pensions Select Committee.

In February 2018, Bowie was appointed Parliamentary Private Secretary (PPS) to the Department for Digital, Culture, Media and Sport under Matt Hancock, and later under Jeremy Wright.

In December 2018, he was promoted to Parliamentary Private Secretary to the Prime Minister by Theresa May until her resignation in July 2019.

In July 2019, Bowie was appointed as one of six vice-chairmen of the Conservative Party and was responsible for the Young Conservatives.

Bowie was re-elected as MP for West Aberdeenshire & Kincardine at the 2019 general election with a decreased vote share of 42.7% and a decreased majority of 843 votes.

In November 2021, Bowie announced he would resign as a vice-chairman of the Conservative Party once a replacement was selected, soon after the forced resignation of Owen Paterson from the party, giving the reason "to focus on representing my constituents in West Aberdeenshire and Kincardine".

From October 2022 to February 2023, Bowie was Parliamentary Under Secretary of State (Minister for Exports) at the Department for International Trade working for Kemi Badenoch.

In 2023, he campaigned against energy pylons in his constituency, describing it as a "priority of mine."

Bowie was again re-elected at the 2024 general election, with a decreased vote share of 35.6% and an increased majority of 3,441 votes.

== Personal life ==
Bowie married his wife Madeleine Clarke, who is originally from Sweden, in 2015. They have one daughter.

Parliament of the United Kingdom
Preceded by Stuart Donaldson	Member of Parliament for West Aberdeenshire and Kincardine; 2017–present	Incumbent
