= George Buchanan-Smith =

Scotland international rugby union player

- Born: George Adam Edward Buchanan-Smith; 20 July 1964 (age 62) Edinburgh, Scotland
- University: Loughborough University

Rugby union career
- Position: Flanker
Amateur team(s)
Years	Team	Apps	(Points)
- Loughborough Students
- London Scottish
Provincial / State sides
Years	Team	Apps	(Points)
- Scottish Exiles
International career
Years	Team	Apps	(Points)
1989	Scotland 'B'	1	(4)
1989-90	Scotland	2	(0)

George Buchanan-Smith (born 20 July 1964) is a former Scotland international rugby union player. He represented Scotland from 1989 to 1990.

== Early life ==
George Buchanan-Smith was born in July 1964 in Edinburgh. He attended Fettes College and later studied at Loughborough University.

His grandfather was Alick Buchanan-Smith, Baron Balerno, a British soldier and prominent geneticist.

== Rugby union career ==
=== Amateur career ===
He played for Loughborough Students before playing for London Scottish.

=== Provincial career ===
He played for the Scottish Exiles district side as a Flanker.

=== International career ===
He was capped by Scotland 'B' to play France 'B' in 1989.

Buchanan-Smith made his international debut on 28 October 1989 at Murrayfield in the Scotland vs Fiji match. Of the 2 matches he played for his national side he was never on the losing side. He played his final match for Scotland on 10 November 1990 at Murrayfield in the Scotland vs Argentina match.

== Later life ==
George Buchanan-Smith went on to become franchisee and operator of three McDonald's restaurants in Dunfermline, Scotland.
