= Colin Thornton-Kemsley =

British politician (1903–1977)

Sir Colin Thornton-Kemsley OBE TD
- 1950 portrait by Bassano Ltd.

Chairman of the National Liberal Party
- In office 1961–1964
- Preceded by: James Henderson-Stewart
- Succeeded by: David Renton

Member of Parliament for North Angus and Mearns (1950-1964) Kincardine and Western Aberdeenshire (1939–1950)
- In office 30 March 1939 – 25 September 1964
- Preceded by: Malcolm Barclay-Harvey
- Succeeded by: Alick Buchanan-Smith

Personal details
- Born: 2 September 1903
- Died: 17 July 1977 (aged 73)
- Party: National Liberal; Conservative

Sir Colin Norman Thornton-Kemsley, OBE, TD (2 September 1903 – 17 July 1977) was a Conservative and National Liberal politician in the United Kingdom. He was the member of parliament (MP) for Kincardine and Western Aberdeenshire from 1939 to 1950, and for North Angus and Mearns from 1950 until his retirement at the 1964 general election.

== Political career ==
Thornton-Kemsley was an active member of the Conservative constituency association for the London suburb of Epping, where he lived. He also served as the Honorary Treasurer of Essex and Middlesex Provincial Area, National Union of Conservative and Unionist Associations.

As a member of the Epping constituency party he made a name for himself in Conservative Party circles as a Neville Chamberlain loyalist who was central to bringing about a censure of Winston Churchill by the Epping Conservative Association.

In 1939 Malcolm Barclay-Harvey, the incumbent Unionist Member of Parliament for Kincardine and Western Aberdeenshire, was offered the position of Governor of South Australia. Thornton-Kemsley, due to his previous role in trying to bringing about a deselection of Churchill by the Epping Conservative Association, was offered the candidacy.

At the outbreak of the Second World War in 1939, Kemsley apologized. Churchill's reply was characteristic: "I certainly think that Englishmen ought to start fair with one another from the outset in so grievous a struggle, and so far as I am concerned the past is dead." (See Thornton-Kemsley, "Winston Secures his Base" in Through Winds and Tides, 1974, pp. 26–36.)

Having joined the Territorial Army (TA) before the war on 31 July 1925, where he was commissioned into the 85th (East Anglian) Field Artillery Brigade of the Royal Artillery, Thornton-Kemsley served during the war. His unit, now the 85th (East Anglian) Field Artillery Regiment, Royal Artillery, was mobilised but went to attend the British Army Staff College at Camberley, from where he graduated and then served as a staff officer with Scottish Command and later Eastern Command.

Party political offices
| Preceded by James Henderson-Stewart | Chairman of the National Liberal Party; 1961–1964 | Succeeded by David Renton |
Parliament of the United Kingdom
| Preceded by Malcolm Barclay-Harvey | Member of Parliament for Kincardine & Western Aberdeenshire; 1939 – 1950 | Constituency abolished |
| New constituency | Member of Parliament for North Angus & Mearns; 1950 – 1964 | Succeeded by Alick Buchanan-Smith |
