= North Angus and Mearns (UK Parliament constituency) =

Parliamentary constituency in the United Kingdom, 1950–1983

Angus North and Mearns
- Former county constituency for the House of Commons
- Subdivisions of Scotland: Kincardineshire, Angus

1950–1983
- Seats: One
- Created from: Forfarshire, Kincardine and Western Aberdeenshire and Montrose Burghs
- Replaced by: East Angus, Kincardine and Deeside and Aberdeen South

Angus North and Mearns was a county constituency represented in the House of Commons of the Parliament of the United Kingdom from 1950 to 1983. It elected one Member of Parliament (MP) by the first past the post voting system.

It was unsuccessfully contested in 1950 by the actor James Robertson Justice.

== Boundaries ==
The constituency was created by the Representation of the People Act 1948, and was defined as consisting of:

- The county of Kincardine inclusive of all the burghs situated therein;
- In the county of Angus
  - The burghs of Brechin and Montrose;
  - The districts of Brechin and Montrose.

=== Redistribution ===
The boundaries of the constituency were unaltered at the next redistribution of seats, which came into effect in 1974. Counties and burghs were abolished for local government purposes in 1975, but parliamentary boundaries were unaffected until 1983. In that year the constituency was abolished. A new Kincardine and Deeside constituency was formed with similar boundaries.

== Members of Parliament ==
Election	Member	Party
1950	Colin Thornton-Kemsley	Conservative and National Liberal
1964	Alick Buchanan-Smith	Conservative
1983	constituency abolished	

== Election results ==
=== Elections of the 1950s ===
1950 general election: North Angus and Mearns
Party	Candidate	Votes	%	±%
National Liberal	Colin Thornton-Kemsley	15,485	51.6	
Labour	James Robertson Justice	8,304	27.7	
Liberal	Tom Adam	6,233	20.8	
Majority		7,181	23.9	
Turnout		30,022	81.4	
National Liberal win (new seat)				

1951 general election: North Angus and Mearns
Party	Candidate	Votes	%	±%
National Liberal	Colin Thornton-Kemsley	18,515	64.1	+12.5
Labour	John Mackie	10,356	35.9	+8.2
Majority		8,159	28.2	+4.3
Turnout		28,871	76.3	−5.1
National Liberal hold		Swing	+2.2	

1955 general election: North Angus and Mearns
Party	Candidate	Votes	%	±%
National Liberal	Colin Thornton-Kemsley	18,516	69.0	+4.9
Labour	Charles Buick	8,323	31.0	−4.9
Majority		10,193	38.0	+9.8
Turnout		26,839	72.3	−4.0
National Liberal hold		Swing	+4.9	

1959 general election: North Angus and Mearns
Party	Candidate	Votes	%	±%
National Liberal	Colin Thornton-Kemsley	17,536	67.4	−1.6
Labour	Robert Hughes	8,486	32.6	+1.6
Majority		9,050	34.8	−3.2
Turnout		26,022	71.3	−1.0
National Liberal hold		Swing	−1.6	

=== Elections of the 1960s ===
1964 general election: North Angus and Mearns
Party	Candidate	Votes	%	±%
Unionist	Alick Buchanan-Smith	13,401	49.3	−18.1
Liberal	Kenneth Alfred John Barton	9,268	34.1	New
Labour	Mary Klopper	4,513	16.6	−16.0
Majority		4,133	15.2	−19.6
Turnout		27,182	77.0	+5.7
Unionist hold		Swing		

1966 general election: North Angus and Mearns
Party	Candidate	Votes	%	±%
Conservative	Alick Buchanan-Smith	13,286	50.4	+1.1
Liberal	Kenneth Alfred John Barton	7,756	29.4	−4.7
Labour	Christopher Thomas Walker	5,318	20.2	+3.6
Majority		5,530	21.0	+5.8
Turnout		26,360	76.2	−0.8
Conservative hold		Swing	+2.9	

=== Elections of the 1970s ===
1970 general election: North Angus and Mearns
Party	Candidate	Votes	%	±%
Conservative	Alick Buchanan-Smith	14,687	53.1	+2.7
Labour	James Gourlay	5,092	18.4	−1.8
SNP	James A. McGugan	4,677	16.9	New
Liberal	John J. Grimond	3,312	11.6	−17.8
Majority		9,595	34.7	+13.7
Turnout		27,768	74.6	−1.6
Conservative hold		Swing		

February 1974 general election: North Angus and Mearns
Party	Candidate	Votes	%	±%
Conservative	Alick Buchanan-Smith	14,288	48.8	−4.3
SNP	Harry Rankin	6,837	23.4	+6.5
Liberal	John Hall	4,412	15.1	+3.5
Labour	Alexander Arnold Charles Stanley	3,745	12.8	−5.6
Majority		7,451	25.4	−9.3
Turnout		29,282	72.7	−1.9
Conservative hold		Swing		

October 1974 general election: North Angus and Mearns
Party	Candidate	Votes	%	±%
Conservative	Alick Buchanan-Smith	11,835	43.6	−5.2
SNP	Iain McDonald Murray	9,284	34.2	+10.8
Labour	James Norman Stewart McEwan	3,344	12.3	−0.5
Liberal	Malcolm Bruce	2,700	9.9	−5.2
Majority		2,551	9.4	−16.0
Turnout		27,163	78.7	+6.0
Conservative hold		Swing	−8.0	

1979 general election: North Angus and Mearns
Party	Candidate	Votes	%	±%
Conservative	Alick Buchanan-Smith	18,302	57.5	+11.9
SNP	Iain McDonald Murray	7,387	23.2	−11.0
Labour	Hugh McMahon	6,132	19.3	+7.0
Majority		10,915	34.3	+24.9
Turnout		31,821	73.8	−4.9
Conservative hold		Swing	+11.5	

== See also ==
- Angus North and Mearns (Scottish Parliament constituency)
