= Malcolm Savidge =

British politician

Member of Parliament for Aberdeen North
- In office 1 May 1997 – 11 April 2005
- Preceded by: Robert Hughes
- Succeeded by: Frank Doran

Personal details
- Born: 9 May 1946 (age 80) Surrey, England
- Party: Labour
- Education: Aberdeen University

Malcolm Kemp Savidge (born 9 May 1946 in Surrey, England) is a politician in the United Kingdom. He was Labour Party Member of Parliament (MP) for Aberdeen North, in Scotland, from the 1997 general election until he stood down in the 2005 general election.

== Early life ==
Educated at Wallington County Grammar School and then Aberdeen University, he was previously a maths teacher for 24 years and was a member of Aberdeen District Council. In 1991, he unsuccessfully contested the Kincardine and Deeside by-election, where he finished in fourth place, and he was defeated again fighting the same seat at the general election the following year.

== Parliamentary career ==
He was elected for Aberdeen North in 1997, with a 47.9% share of the vote and a majority of 10,010 votes over Brian Adam of the SNP.

The Sunday Working (Scotland) Act 2003 was the result of a Private Member's Bill raised by Savidge during 2003. The Act extended to Scotland the rights enjoyed by shopworkers in England and Wales to refuse to work on a Sunday.

When the number of Parliamentary constituencies in Scotland was reduced for the 2005 general election, the former Aberdeen Central constituency was mostly absorbed into an expanded Aberdeen North. The Aberdeen Central MP Frank Doran was selected as the Labour candidate for Aberdeen North, and Savidge did not contest the 2005 general election.

== After Parliament ==
Since leaving Westminster he has been a member of the British American Security Information Council , and has been a consultant to the Oxford Research Group.

Parliament of the United Kingdom
| Preceded by Robert Hughes | Member of Parliament for Aberdeen North; 1997–2005 | Succeeded by Frank Doran |
