= Alick Buchanan-Smith, Baron Balerno =

England politician and geneticist (1898–1984)

Lord Balerno, 1967.

Brigadier Alick Drummond Buchanan-Smith, Baron Balerno, CBE, TD, JP, DL, FRSE, FRSGS (9 October 1898 – 28 July 1984) was a British soldier and prominent geneticist.

== Life ==
He was born in Glasgow, the son of the Very Rev. George Adam Smith and Alice Lillian (née Buchanan), daughter of Sir George Buchanan.

The family lived at 22 Sardinia Terrace (now demolished). He was educated at Glasgow Academy and Glenalmond College.

He was commissioned as a 2nd Lieutenant in World War I, 1916–18 with the Gordon Highlanders but was too young for active service.

After the war he studied sciences at the University of Aberdeen where he graduated MA BSc. In 1925 he began lecturing at the Institute of Animal Genetics in Edinburgh where he remained for most of his career. He was awarded a DSc from the University there in 1938, on inbreeding in Jersey cattle. In 1928 he was elected a Fellow of the Royal Society of Edinburgh. His proposers were Robert Blyth Greig, John Bartholomew, D'Arcy Wentworth Thompson and Francis Albert Eley Crew. He served as the Royal Society's vice-president twice: 1966/67 and 1977/80. He was awarded the Society's bicentenary medal in 1983.

He served in the Second World War, 1939–45 with both the 5th and 9th Battalion, Gordon Highlanders on active service in France, and later was Director of the Selection of Personnel, for the War Office. He was appointed an Officer of the Order of the British Empire (OBE) in 1939, promoted to Commander (CBE) in 1945 and he retired in 1956 with the rank of Brigadier. In the 1956 Birthday Honours he was awarded a knighthood, having the honour conferred by HM The Queen on 10 July 1956. He had held many positions in military education. He served from 1953 to 1959 as Chairman of the Central Organisation of Military Education Committees of the Universities and University Colleges, what is now the Council of Military Education Committees of the Universities of the United Kingdom (COMEC).

Originally an agriculturalist, his genetics research earned him the degree of Doctor of Science from the University of Aberdeen, and he lectured in this subject at the University of Edinburgh.

He was created a life peer as Baron Balerno, of Currie in the County of Midlothian on 9 July 1963, having been Deputy Chairman of the Unionist Party in Scotland (1960–1963).

From 1966 to 1970 he was Chairman of Heriot-Watt College. In 1976 he was made an Honorary Member of the British Veterinary Association.

He is buried with his wife, Mary Kathleen Smith of Pittodrie, and eldest son, Rev George Adam Buchanan-Smith (1929–1983) in the north-east corner of Currie Cemetery, next to their second son, Alick Laidlaw Buchanan-Smith.

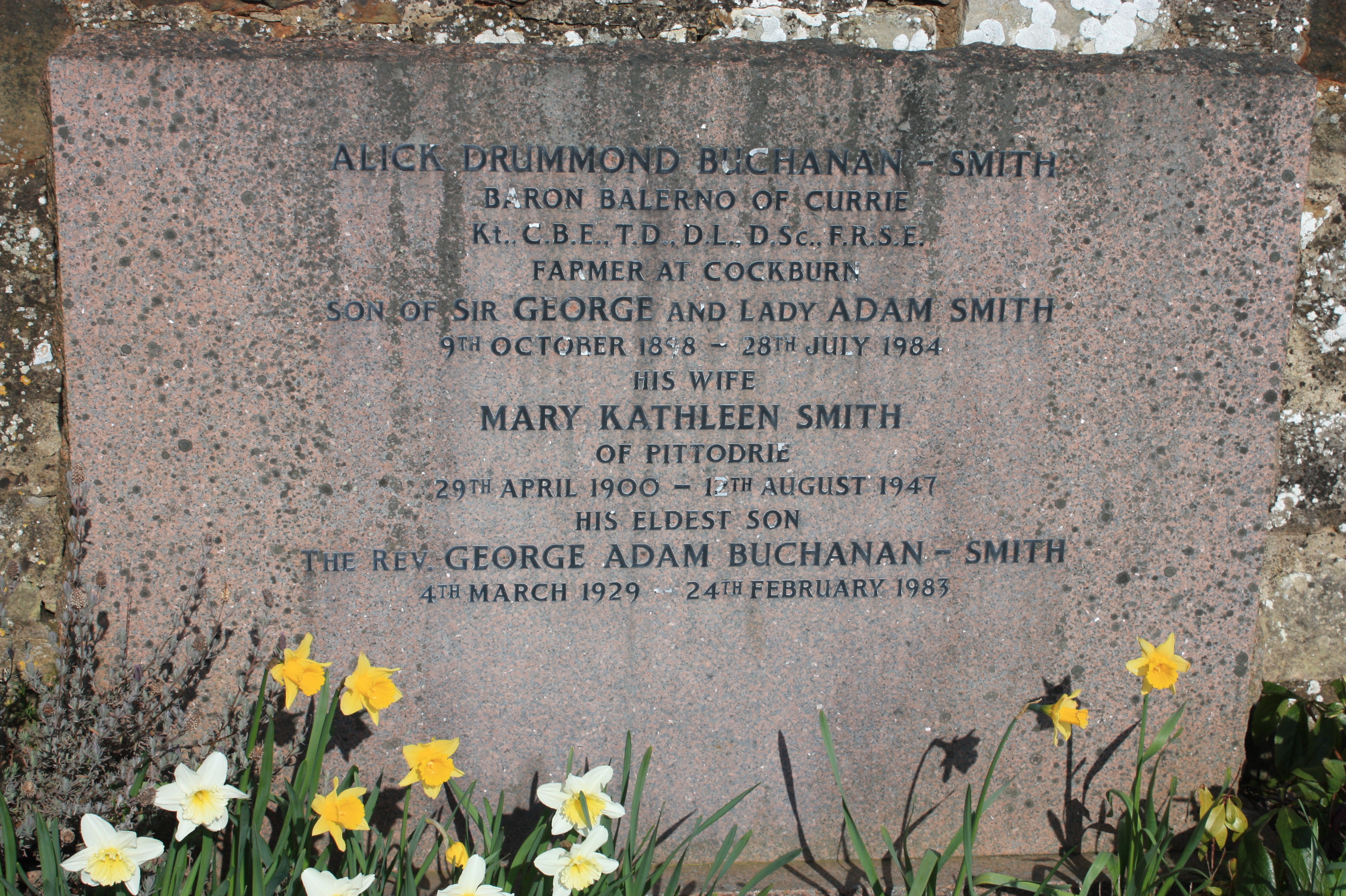
The grave of Alick Drummond Buchanan-Smith, Currie Cemetery

== Family ==
His siblings included Janet Adam Smith and Kathleen Buchanan Smith who married George Paget Thomson.

In 1926 he married Mary Kathleen Smith. Their children included the politician, Alick Buchanan-Smith and philanthropist, Mary Drummond Corsar (nee Buchanan-Smith).

One of his grandsons is George Buchanan-Smith, a former Scotland international rugby union player.

== Publications ==
- Alick Drummond Buchanan Smith; Olive Janet Robinson; D. M. Bryant (1936). The Genetics of the Pig, University of Edinburgh Institute of Animal Genetics. Dordrecht: Springer. ISBN 940175666X, 162 pp.

== Arms ==
Coat of arms of Alick Buchanan-Smith, Baron Balerno

Crest
A skylark rising Proper.
Escutcheon
Vert a saltire between a bough pot Or charged with three salmon fishes in fret Proper and containing as many lilies of the garden the dexter in bud the centre full blown and the sinister half blown also Proper in chief a cross crosslet in each flank and a lion rampant in base holding in his dexter paw an Imperial crown Or.
Supporters
Dexter, a bull Or horned as those of Ayrshire bulls Gules unguled of the last and gorged of a collar of ivy Proper, sinister a boar Or armed Vert langued crined and unguled Gules.
Motto
Meet The Sun Half Way
