= Sir Robert Smith, 3rd Baronet =

British politician (born 1958)

Sir Robert Smith Bt
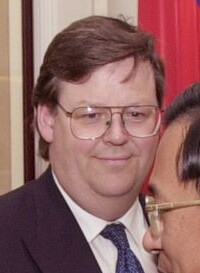
- Smith in 2002

Chairman of the Energy and Climate Change Select Committee Interim
- In office 11 June – 26 November 2013
- Preceded by: Tim Yeo
- Succeeded by: Tim Yeo

Member of Parliament for West Aberdeenshire and Kincardine
- In office 1 May 1997 – 30 March 2015
- Preceded by: Constituency created
- Succeeded by: Stuart Donaldson

Personal details
- Born: 15 April 1958 (age 68)
- Party: SDP (before 1988); Liberal Democrats (since 1988)
- Education: University of Aberdeen

Sir Robert Hill Smith, 3rd Baronet of Crowmallie (born 15 April 1958) is a Scottish Liberal Democrat politician who was the Member of Parliament for West Aberdeenshire and Kincardine from 1997 to 2015.

== Early life ==
Educated at the Merchant Taylors' School, London and the University of Aberdeen (MA), Robert Smith was a member of the Social Democratic Party (SDP) before its merger with the Liberal Party to form the Liberal Democrats. He served as an Aberdeenshire Councillor and Convener of the Grampian Joint Police Board 1995–97.

Smith's grandfather, Sir Robert Workman Smith, 1st Baronet, represented the same constituency for the Unionist Party (then a group allied to the Conservatives) from 1924 until 1945.

== Parliamentary career ==
Smith contested Aberdeen North in 1987 and was first elected to Parliament in 1997. He was the Liberal Democrat Deputy Chief Whip in the House of Commons.

Smith's areas of political interest include energy policy, rural issues and international development. His previous portfolios included party Energy spokesperson, Deputy Chief Whip and shadowing the Scotland Office. He represented a large rural constituency where the oil and gas industry, subsea engineering and marine renewables are major employers, and was a member of the Energy & Climate Change Select Committee from its creation in 2009 until 2015, acting as Interim Committee Chair from June to November 2013. He sat on the International Development Select Committee from 2007 to 2009, and served on the Trade & Industry Select Committee, Scottish Affairs Select Committee and the Procedure Committee during his time in Parliament in Westminster. Smith was a Vice-Chair of the All-Party Parliamentary Group (APPG) for the UK Offshore Oil and Gas Industry, and also a Vice-Chair of the Post Offices APPG and Co-Chair of the APPG on Afghanistan. He serves as Honorary Vice-President of Energy Action Scotland, a fuel poverty charity.

Smith stood for reelection in the 2015 general election, but was defeated by Stuart Donaldson of the Scottish National Party (SNP), at a Westminster election where the SNP won all but three seats in Scotland, and the Liberal Democrats were reduced to just eight seats across the UK.

== Personal life ==
Smith succeeded to the baronetcy of Crowmallie upon his father's death in 1983. He married Fiona Cormack in 1993; they have three daughters.

The heir presumptive to the title is his brother, Charles Smith.

In 2013, Smith was diagnosed with Parkinson's disease.

In 2020, the family seat, Crowmallie House, was put up for sale.

Parliament of the United Kingdom
New constituency	Member of Parliament for West Aberdeenshire and Kincardine; 1997 – 2015	Succeeded by Stuart Donaldson
Baronetage of the United Kingdom
Preceded by William Gordon Smith	Baronet (of Crowmallie, Aberdeen); 1983–present	Incumbent
