= Alick Buchanan-Smith (politician) =

Scottish politician

The Right Honourable Alick Buchanan-Smith MP

Minister of State for Energy
- In office 13 June 1983 – 11 June 1987
- Prime Minister: Margaret Thatcher
- Preceded by: Hamish Gray
- Succeeded by: Peter Morrison

Minister of State for Agriculture, Fisheries and Food
- In office 7 May 1979 – 13 June 1983
- Prime Minister: Margaret Thatcher
- Preceded by: Edward Bishop
- Succeeded by: John MacGregor

Shadow Secretary of State for Scotland
- In office March 1974 – 9 December 1976
- Leader: Margaret Thatcher
- Preceded by: Willie Ross
- Succeeded by: Teddy Taylor

Member of Parliament for Kincardine and Deeside North Angus and Mearns (1964–1983)
- In office 15 October 1964 – 29 August 1991
- Preceded by: Sir Colin Thornton-Kemsley
- Succeeded by: Nicol Stephen

Personal details
- Born: 8 April 1932
- Died: 29 August 1991 (aged 59)
- Party: Conservative
- Relations: Alick Buchanan-Smith, Baron Balerno (Father)
- Education: Pembroke College, Cambridge; University of Edinburgh

Alick Laidlaw Buchanan-Smith (8 April 1932 – 29 August 1991) was a Scottish Conservative and Unionist politician.

The second son of Alick Buchanan-Smith, Baron Balerno and Mary Kathleen Smith, he was educated at Edinburgh Academy, Glenalmond College, Pembroke College, Cambridge and the University of Edinburgh. He was commissioned into the Gordon Highlanders and did his National Service from 1951.

He was unsuccessful parliamentary candidate for West Fife in 1959, and sat as member for North Angus and Mearns from 1964 to 1983 and for Kincardine and Deeside from 1983 until his death.

He was Parliamentary Under-Secretary of State for Scotland from 1970 to 1974, Minister of State for Agriculture, Fisheries and Food from 1979 to 1983, and Minister of State for Energy from 1983 to 1987. He was appointed a Privy Counsellor in 1981.

Following the Conservative's defeat in the February 1974 general election he became Shadow Secretary of State for Scotland under Edward Heath. When Margaret Thatcher succeeded Heath as Conservative leader The Glasgow Herald reported speculation that Buchanan-Smith was one of a group of "top Tories" who might refuse to serve under her. Ultimately he remained in post under Thatcher, but resigned in 1976, along with his junior shadow minister Malcolm Rifkind, when she changed the Conservative Party's policy to oppose Scottish devolution. Subsequently, he led the Conservative contribution to the Yes campaign in the 1979 Scottish devolution referendum.

Although the Conservatives returned to power following the 1979 general election, Buchanan-Smith's successor as Shadow Scottish Secretary, Teddy Taylor, lost his seat. Because Taylor could not be the new Secretary of State for Scotland, there was speculation about who would fill the post. Stuart Trotter, writing in The Glasgow Herald, correctly tipped George Younger, noting that, while Buchanan-Smith had a similar level of experience, the fact that he had resigned over devolution, and his contribution to the Yes campaign in the recent devolution referendum, made his appointment to the Scottish Office "unlikely". However, Trotter correctly predicted that Buchanan-Smith might be offered a ministerial post in another department if Thatcher was aiming to unify the Conservative Party.

Buchanan-Smith was appointed a privy counsellor in the 1981 Birthday Honours.

In the 1989 Conservative leadership election, Buchanan-Smith was reported to be one of 33 Conservative MPs to vote for Sir Anthony Meyer, the challenger to Margaret Thatcher. Already in poor health, he voted by proxy.

He is buried under a very modest memorial in the north-east corner of Currie Cemetery, next to his parents and eldest brother, Rev George Adam Buchanan-Smith (1929-1983).

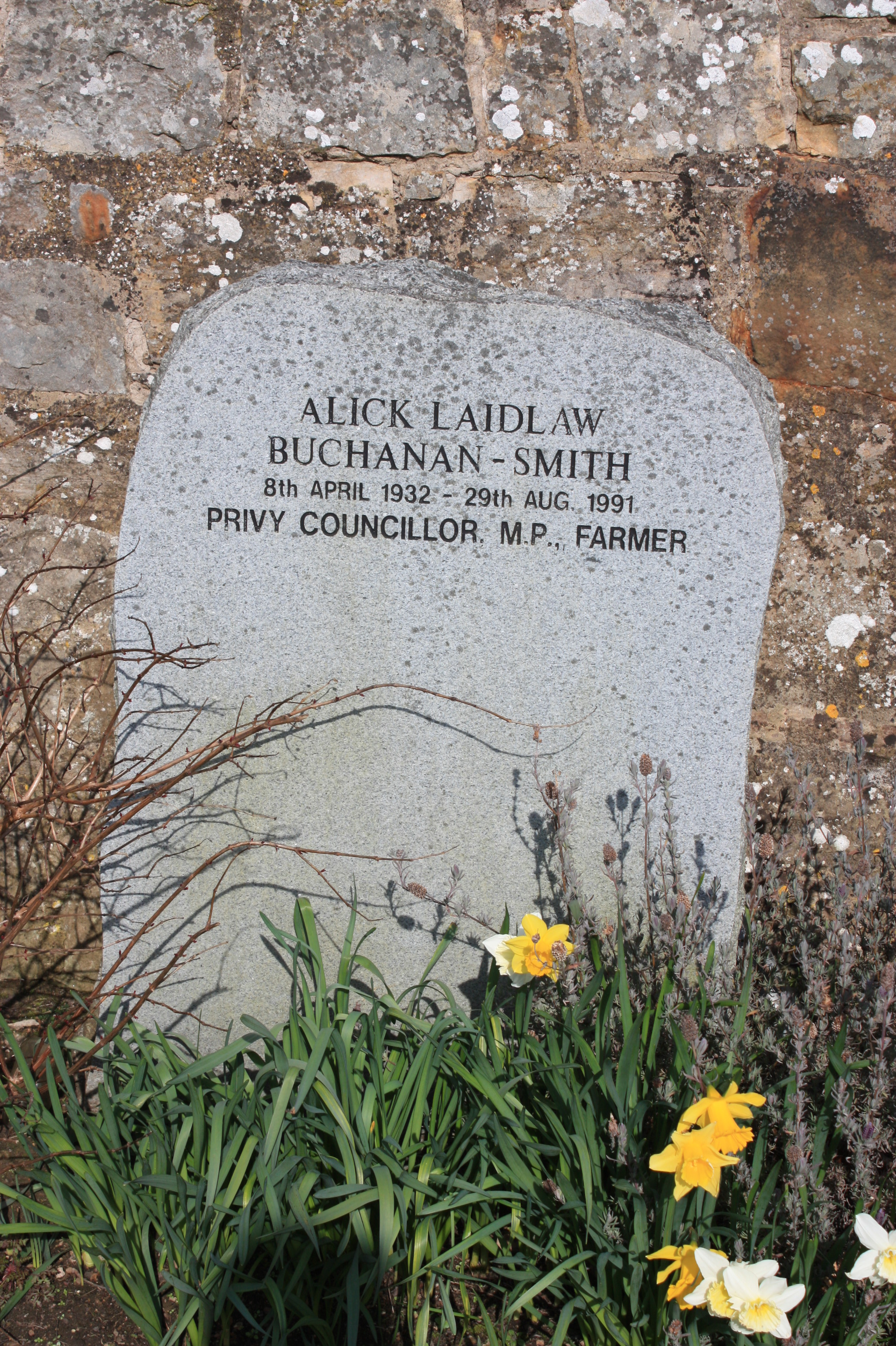
The grave of Alick Buchanan-Smith, Currie Cemetery

Parliament of the United Kingdom
| Preceded by Sir Colin Thornton-Kemsley | Member of Parliament for North Angus & Mearns; 1964 – 1983 | Constituency abolished |
| New constituency | Member of Parliament for Kincardine & Deeside; 1983 – 1991 | Succeeded by Nicol Stephen |
