= Blaikie =

- Language: Scots

Origin
- Origin: Scotland
- Derivation: Blaik, a. [e.m.E. and ME. blake, ME. blaak(e, OE. blace, blaca, etc., declensional forms of blæc Blak a.] Black.
- Meaning: descriptive of appearance, diminutive form of the colour black, "-ie" is a common Scots language diminutive suffix

Other names
- Variant forms: Blackie, Blaickie, Blakie, Blaikkie, Bleakie, Blekie, Bleckie
- Cognates: Dow, Dowie, Duff, Duffie, McIldowie, McElduff, McIlduff

Blaikie is a Scottish surname.

== Etymology ==
Blaikie derives from "blaik" (adj.), a word in the Scots language meaning black, plus the common Scots diminutive suffix "-ie".

The Dictionar o the Scots Leid ("Dictionary of the Scots Language") says the etymology of "blaik" is: "Blaik, a. [e.m.E. and ME. blake, ME. blaak(e, OE. blace, blaca, etc., declensional forms of blæc Blak a.] Black.".

== People ==
- Bill Blaikie (1951-2022), former Canadian MP and deputy leader of the New Democratic Party (NDP) in Canada.
- Colin Fraser Blaikie (born 1941), Scotland international rugby union player.
- Daniel Blaikie (born 1984), Canadian MP from the New Democratic Party (NDP).
- George Blaikie (1915–1995), Australian author and journalist.
- Jane Currie Blaikie Hoge, welfare worker, fund raiser, and wartime nurse.
- James Ogilvie Blaikie of Craigiebuckler (1786–1836), Lord Provost of Aberdeen (1833–1836).
- John Blaikie (born 1973) former professional rugby union player from New Zealand.
- John Arthur Blaikie (1849–1917, English poet and journalist.
- John MacKay Blaikie (born 1837) Canadian shipbuilder from Great Village, Nova Scotia.
- Margaret Catherine Blaikie (1823 -1915), Scottish temperance reformer
- Peter Macfarlane Blaikie (born 1937), Canadian lawyer and politician.
- Piers MacLeod Blaikie (born 1942), Scottish geographer and scholar of international development and natural resources.
- Rebecca Blaikie (born 1978), Canadian MP and former president of the New Democratic Party.
- Sir Thomas Blaikie (1802–1861), Lord Provost of Aberdeen (1839–1847 and 1853–1856).
- Thomas Blaikie (gardener) (1758–1838), Scottish gardener and author.
- Walter Biggar Blaikie (1847–1928), Scottish civil engineer, printer, historian and astronomer.
- William Garden Blaikie (1820–1899), Scottish writer, biographer, and activist in the temperance movement.

== Other ==
Blaikie may also refer to:

- Aberdeen Railway Co v Blaikie Brothers, UK company law case.
- Agnes Blaikie (barque), merchant ship chartered by the British government during the Crimean War.
- Attorney General of Quebec v. Blaikie (No. 1), Supreme Court of Canada decision on language rights.
- Heenan Blaikie, defunct Canadian law firm (1973 - 2014).

== See also ==
- Blackie (disambiguation)
