= Kirk of St Nicholas =

Coordinates: 57.1476°N 2.0992°W

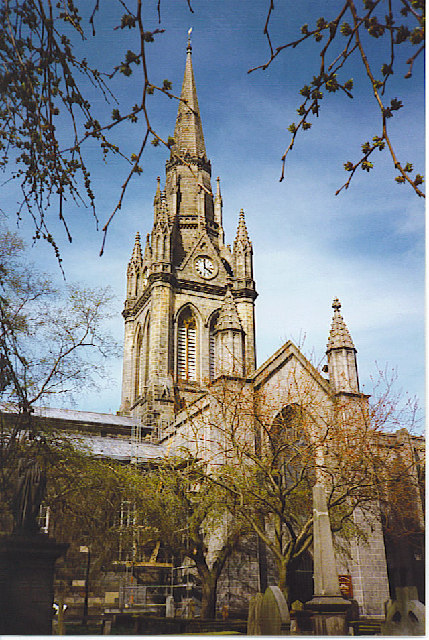
- View from the kirkyard
- Kirk of St Nicholas
- Location: Back Wynd, Aberdeen, AB10 1JZ
- Country: Scotland
- Denomination: Church of Scotland
- Previous denomination: Roman Catholic
- Website

Listed Building – Category A
- Official name: The Kirk of St Nicholas Uniting (Church of Scotland and United Reformed)
- Designated: 12 January 1967
- Reference no.: LB19966

History
- Dedication: St Nicholas

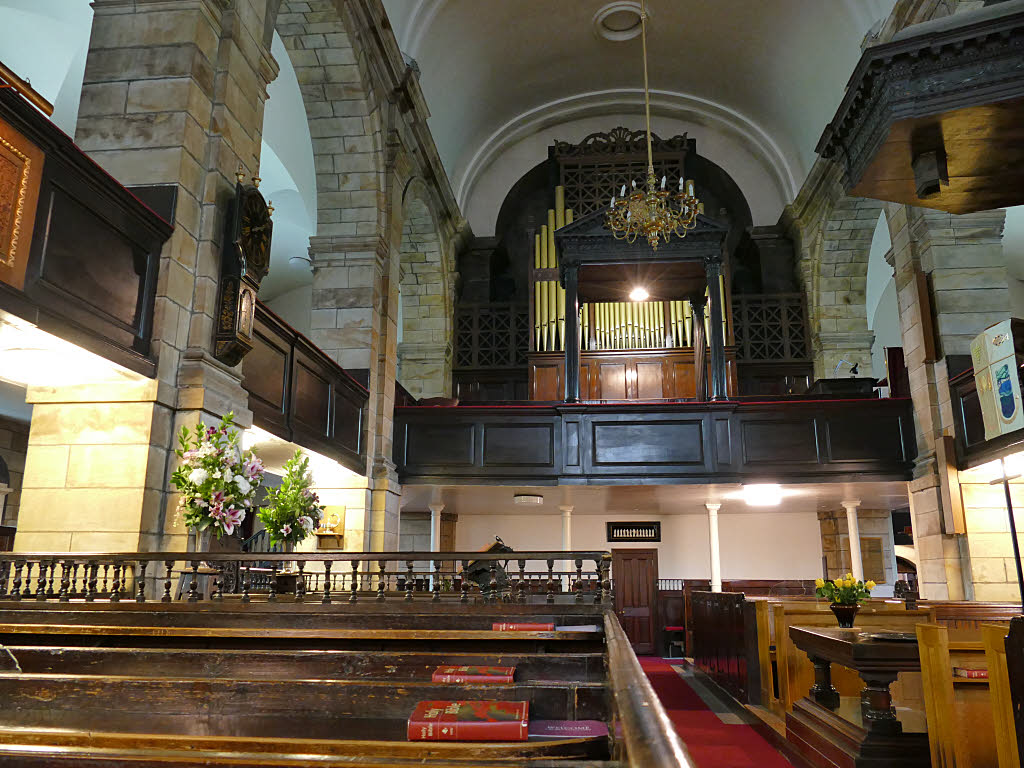
Interior of the West Kirk

The Kirk of St Nicholas is a historic church in Aberdeen, Scotland. It is the original parish church of the city, and is also known locally as the Mither Kirk or mother church. Following the Reformation, it was divided between two congregations, the East Kirk and the West Kirk. These merged in the 1980s to form the Kirk of St Nicholas Uniting. In 2020, the congregation merged with that of Queen's Cross Church and the Kirk of St Nicholas ceased to be used for regular worship. The West Kirk is now owned by Scot-ART.

The Oil and Gas chapel contains wooden furniture made by the late Tim Stead alongside a stained glass window that depicts life in Aberdeen, created by Scottish artist, Shona MacInnes.

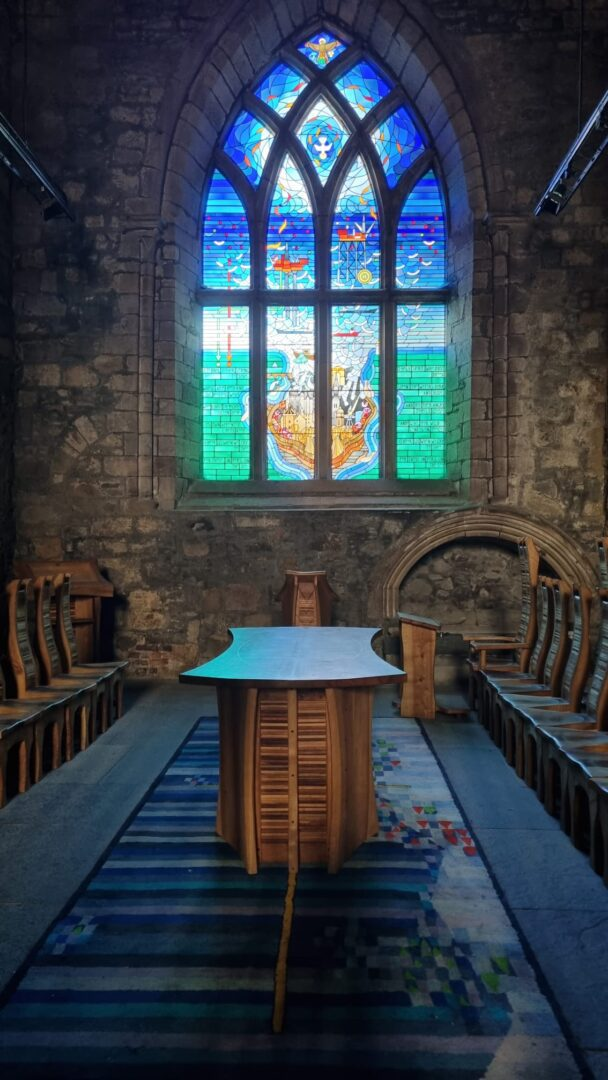
The stained glass window by Shona MacInnes

== History ==
The earliest mention of a church on the site of the present Kirk can be found in a Papal document of 1151. Given Aberdeen's proximity to the sea, Saint Nicholas was chosen as the patron saint of New Aberdeen, as patron saint of commerce.

The Kirk was enlarged in the 15th century. St Nicholas and St Mary's, Dundee, were probably the largest parish churches in medieval Scotland. This work was dedicated by Bishop Elphinstone in 1498. The 500th anniversary of the dedication of the enlarged church was marked with the installation of a special stained-glass window at the main entrance to the Kirk, overlooking Drum's Aisle.

The church contains the Drum Aisle (the ancient burial-place of the Irvines of Drum Castle) and the Collison Aisle, which divide the two congregations and which formed the transepts of the 12th-century church of St Nicholas (architectural detail survives from this period). The West Church was built between 1751 and 1755, to plans given to the burgh by James Gibbs, in the Italian style, on the site of the medieval nave, the East in 1834 in Gothic-revival style on the site of the choir. In 1874 a fire destroyed the East Church and the old central tower with its lead-clad timber spire and its fine peal of nine bells, one of which, Laurence or "Lowrie", was 4 ft (1.2 m) in diameter at the mouth, 3.5 ft (1.1 m) high and very thick. The church was rebuilt and a massive granite tower erected over the intervening aisles, a new carillon of 36 bells, cast in Belgium, being installed to commemorate the Victorian jubilee of 1887. Because the tuning of these bells by van Aerschot was not so good, the bells were replaced in 1950 with 48 bells made by Gillett & Johnston, it is now one of the largest carillons in the British Isles.

The building includes two sanctuaries under one roof (though only one is now used). Following considerable decay, the old nave collapsed in approximately 1742. A rebuilt church – known as the West Kirk – was built in 1755. It is the only James Gibbs. building in Scotland. This is still used for regular worship. The other section – the East Kirk – though it was still complete and retained a wooden medieval roof similar to that which survives at King's College Chapel, Old Aberdeen, was rebuilt in 1837, by Archibald Simpson, and had to be again rebuilt following a fire in 1874. Extensive renovation and archaeological work is currently taking place in the East Kirk. The foundations of earlier phases of the Kirk, many medieval burials, and large numbers of architectural fragments are among the rich finds from this important site.

The Oil Chapel was dedicated in 1990 to mark 25 years of North Sea oil. The chapel hosts a book of remembrance to all those who have died offshore in British waters.

Despite the many alterations to the fabric of the Kirk over the year's, St Nicholas retains a larger number of medieval effigies than any other Scottish parish church, though none of these are in their original positions. The Vault or Chapel of Our Lady of Pity survives under the east end of the Kirk. It has been refaced externally, but retains its medieval vaults within. A number of pieces of late medieval and 17th century woodwork are preserved in this vault. The council records of Aberdeen for 1562 mention that the lead from around the font from the church was stolen, and Steven Allan and John Gunther were ordered to make repairs or be perpetually banished from Aberdeen.

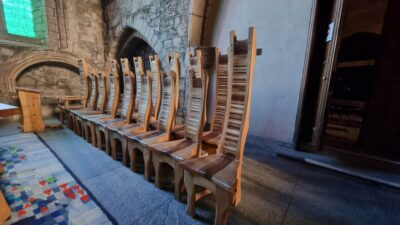
The wooden furnishings by Tim Stead

The former Kirk of St Nicholas Parish is now incorporated into the Parish of St Mark's, also under the ministry of Interim Minister, The Revd Ian Murray. The west Kirk is now owned by Scottish charity, Scot-ART who took over in 2024.

== Clock ==
A clock was built by Gillett, Bland and Company in 1870 but this was moved to Aberdeen Town House in 1887. A new clock by J. B. Joyce & Co was installed in 1890.

== Churchyard ==
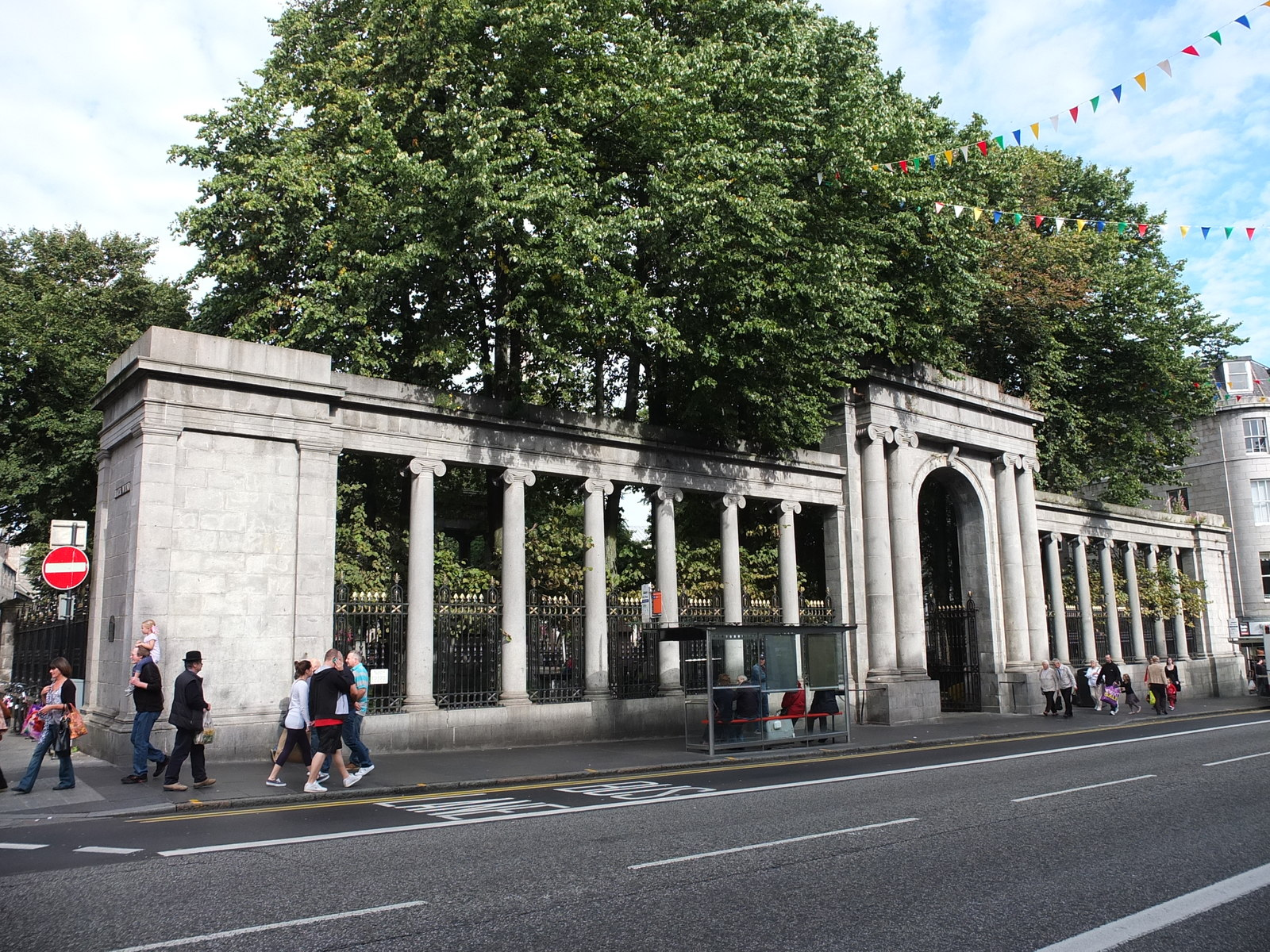
Colonnade at the entrance to the kirkyard

The graveyard surrounds the church on three sides: north, south and west.

It is extremely crowded on the west and south sides. It has a high proportion of table stones.

It does not follow the standard Scottish pattern of stones generally facing east.

Close to the church on its south side a number of ground slabs now form part of paving, and are also used for car parking, a feature generally unseen in Scotland.

Monuments date from the mid 17th century.

The boundary onto Union Street was rebuilt as a very formal Georgian colonnade in the 19th century.

== Notable Ministers ==
- Adam Heriot (1514-1574) from 1560 to 1573
- John Craig (c.1512-1600) from 1573 to 1579, three times Moderator of the General Assembly
- Peter Blackburn from 1582 to 1596, later made Bishop of Aberdeen
- David Cunningham from 1596 to 1600, also Bishop of Aberdeen
- Archibald Blackburn from 1601 to 1625, son of Peter Blackburn
- James Sibbald from 1625 to 1641
- Andrew Cant from 1641 to 1660
- Patrick Sibbald from 1666 to 1686, son of James Sibbald
- Andrew Burnett from 1686 to 1695
- James Osborne from 1695 to 1697
- Colin Campbell from 1702 to 1728, father of George Campbell, Principal of Marischal College
- James Sherriffs from 1779 to 1814, Moderator of the General Assembly in 1807
- Alexander Dyce Davidson 1836 to 1843, left to join the Free Church of Scotland
- James Robert Mitford Mitchell 1878 to 1895, Moderator of the General Assembly in 1907
- Robert Howie Fisher from 1896 to 1900

== Notable burials ==
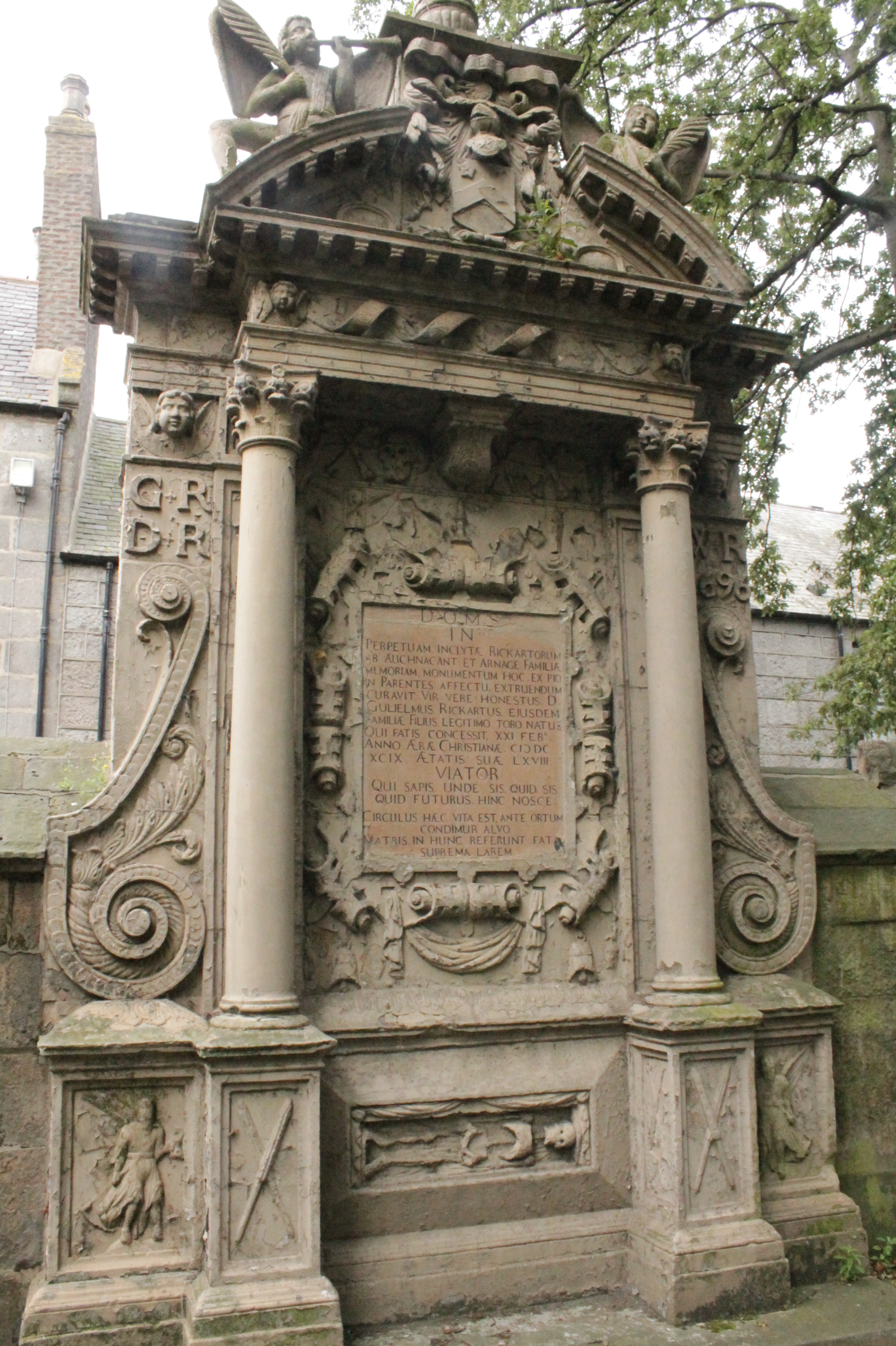
The grave of William Rickart

- Alexander Anderson (provost)
- Sir John Anderson
- John Henry Anderson Wizard of the North
- Rev Dr Thomas Blackwell, principal of Marischal College
- Sir Thomas Blaikie
- Rev Prof William Laurence Brown (inside kirk)
- John Burnett of Elrick
- Rev George Campbell
- Rev Andrew Cant
- William Cruden, twice provost of Aberdeen
- John Cruickshank (mathematician)
- William Cruickshank, twice Provost
- George Davidson of Pettens
- Robert Davidson, Provost of Aberdeen
- Robert Dyce
- William Dyce memorialised on his parents' grave
- Alexander Dingwall Fordyce
- John Gibb (engineer)
- George Russell Gowans RSW artist
- Rev Dr William Guild
- Gavin Hadden, four times Lord Provost
- Prof Robert Hamilton
- James Jopp five times Provost of Aberdeen
- James Melvin Latin scholar
- Andrew Moir (anatomist)
- James Mowat of Logie (d.1662)
- Cpt William Penny Arctic explorer
- William Rickart
- Archibald Simpson
- George Skene, Provost of Aberdeen
- John Smith (architect)
- Gavin Turreff, author
- Alexander Walker (d.1711) Provost 1697/8
- John Webster Lord Provost 1856 to 1859 and MP for Aberdeen

== Other memorials ==
- Plaque to Rev Alexander Hetherwick
- Plaque to Very Rev Mitford Mitchell minister from 1878 to 1895 and Moderator of the General Assembly

== See also ==
- Action of Churches Together in Scotland
