= Blackie =

Blackie may refer to:

== Places ==
- Blackie, Alberta, Canada
- Blackie Lake, California, United States

== People and fictional characters ==
- Blackie (surname)
- Blackie (nickname), including people and fictional characters nicknamed either Blackie or Blacky
- Blackie (musician), stage name of American rapper Michael LaCour (born 1987)

== Animals ==
- Blackie (American horse), a Californian horse who became a local mascot
- Blackie (army horse), a British Army horse

== Other uses ==
- Blackie (guitar), Eric Clapton's favorite Fender Stratocaster guitar
- Blackie and Son, a former Glasgow-based publishing house
- South African "Blackie" 0-4-2WT, a railroad locomotive
- Blackie, an ethnic slur referring to a person belonging to a darkly pigmented race; a black person.
- Blackie and Son, an English publisher

== See also ==
- Blxckie, South African rapper Sihle Sithole (born 1999)
- Blackia, 2019 Indian Punjabi-language period-action film
