= George Davidson =

George Davidson may refer to:

- George Davidson of Pettens (c. 1593–1663), Scottish landowner, merchant and philanthropist
- George Davidson (athlete) (1898–1948), New Zealand track and field athlete
- George Davidson (attorney) (born 1942), American attorney
- George Davidson (basketball) (1925–2017), American basketball coach and player
- George Davidson (cricketer) (1866–1899), Derbyshire cricketer
- George Davidson (footballer) (1872–1945), Australian rules footballer who played with South Melbourne
- George Davidson (geographer) (1825–1911), English-American geographer
- George Davidson (minister) (1855–1936), Presbyterian minister in South Australia
- George Davidson (politician) (1850–1935), Northwest Territories MLA
- George Forrester Davidson (1909–1995), Canadian civil servant
- George Ramsay Davidson (1801–1890), Scottish minister
- GeorgeNotFound (George Henry Davidson, born 1996), English internet personality

== See also ==
- George Davidson Grant (1870–1915), Canadian politician
- George Davidson Todd (1856–1929), mayor of Louisville, Kentucky
- George Davison (disambiguation)
