= Blakey =

Blakey is a surname, and may refer to:

== People ==
- Art Blakey (1919–1990), an American jazz musician
  - Blakey (album), a 1954 album by Art Blakey
- DJ Blakey, a DJ from London, UK
- George Blakey may refer to:
  - George Blakey (1907–1968), an English cricketer
  - George D. Blakey, an American politician and former Mayor of Tulsa
  - G. Robert Blakey (born 1936), an American law professor and an expert on organized crime
- John Blakey (born 1966), an Australian football player
- Marion Blakey (born 1948), an American businesswoman
- Michael Blakey (disambiguation)
- Nicholas Blakey (died 1758), Irish-born draughtsman and engraver
- Richard Blakey (born 1967), an English cricketer
- Ruble Blakey (1911–1912), American jazz singer, emcee, actor
- Ted Blakey (1925–2004), American businessman, activist, and historian

=== Fictional people ===
- Cyril "Blakey" Blake, an inspector in sitcom On the Buses played by Stephen Lewis

== See also ==
- Blaikie
- Blake
