= Thomas Leys =

Provost of Aberdeen

Thomas Leys (1764–1809) was an Aberdeen magistrate and merchant who was twice Provost of Aberdeen. His most notable action was the creation of Union Street, Aberdeen.

== Life ==
He was the son of Francis Leys (d.1788), a Baillie in Aberdeen, and his wife, Elizabeth Ingram, daughter of William Ingram, a merchant in Huntly. His parents had married in 1755. Thomas was born in 1764. His father was a partner in Leys, Masson & Co, who had a thread and cloth mill at Gordon's Mills in Aberdeen (later known as Grandholm Works).

On his father's death in 1788 Thomas inherited the mills and a recently acquired estate at Glasgowforest in the parish of Kinellar.

He appears to have trained as a lawyer and was serving as Chief Magistrate of Aberdeen in the late 18th century. At this phase he was involved in the plans to create a major new road in the centre, with Baillie James Hadden, which later materialised as Union Street, Aberdeen which was built over a ten year period roughly 1800 to 1810.

He was first elected Provost of Aberdeen in 1797, serving a then-standard two year term. He served a second term 1803 to 1805. He died unmarried on 24 October 1809 aged only 45.

His sister Christian Leys (d.1809) married Provost Alexander Brebner of Learnie who was also a partner in Leys Masson & Co.

Civic offices
Preceded by George More	Lord Provost of Aberdeen; 1797–1799	Succeeded by John Dingwall
Preceded by James Hadden	Lord Provost of Aberdeen; 1803–1805	Succeeded by Alexander Brebner
