= Robert Pollock (principal) =

Church of Scotland minister

- Born: 4 December 1707; Edinburgh
- Died: 18 May 1759 (aged 51); Aberdeen
- Occupation: Principal of Marischal College
- Spouse: Elizabeth Robertson
- Children: 5

Academic background
- Education: University of Edinburgh

Robert Pollock (1709–1759) was a Church of Scotland minister who served as principal of Marischal College in Aberdeen from 1757 to 1759.

== Life ==
He was born on 4 December 1707 in Edinburgh. He was educated at the University of Edinburgh graduating with an MA in May 1725. He trained as a Church of Scotland minister he was licensed by the Presbytery of Edinburgh in November 1732 but took several years to find a patron. He was ordained as minister of Duddingston Kirk just south of Edinburgh, in March 1744.

In July 1745 he translated to Greyfriars Church, Aberdeen. In August of the same year he took on the additional role of Professor of Divinity at Marischal College.

In May 1740 he took on the additional role as Almoner to the King (George II). In 1753 he was awarded a Doctor of Divinity. In April 1757 he succeeded Rev Dr Thomas Blackwell as Principal of Marishal College.

He died in Aberdeen on 18 May 1759. His position as principal was filled by Rev George Campbell.

== Family ==
In 1747 he married Elizabeth Robertson, daughter of Alexander Robertson of Glasgowego, Provost of Aberdeen. They had several children:

- Alexander Pollock (b. 1748) surgeon in Aberdeen
- Jane Pollock (1749-1840) married Alexander Duthie, advocate in Aberdeen
- James 1751-1752
- Margaret Pollock (1752-1831) married Alexander Dauney, advocate in Aberdeen
- Walter (b.1753) - Elizabeth died at or soon after this birth

== Artistic recognition ==
Joint portraits of Pollock and his wife (artist unknown) are held by the University of Aberdeen.
