= John Webster (MP) =

Scottish lawyer and politician

John Webster LLD (1810 – 31 May 1891) was a Scottish lawyer and a Liberal politician who sat in the House of Commons from 1880 to 1885.

== Life ==
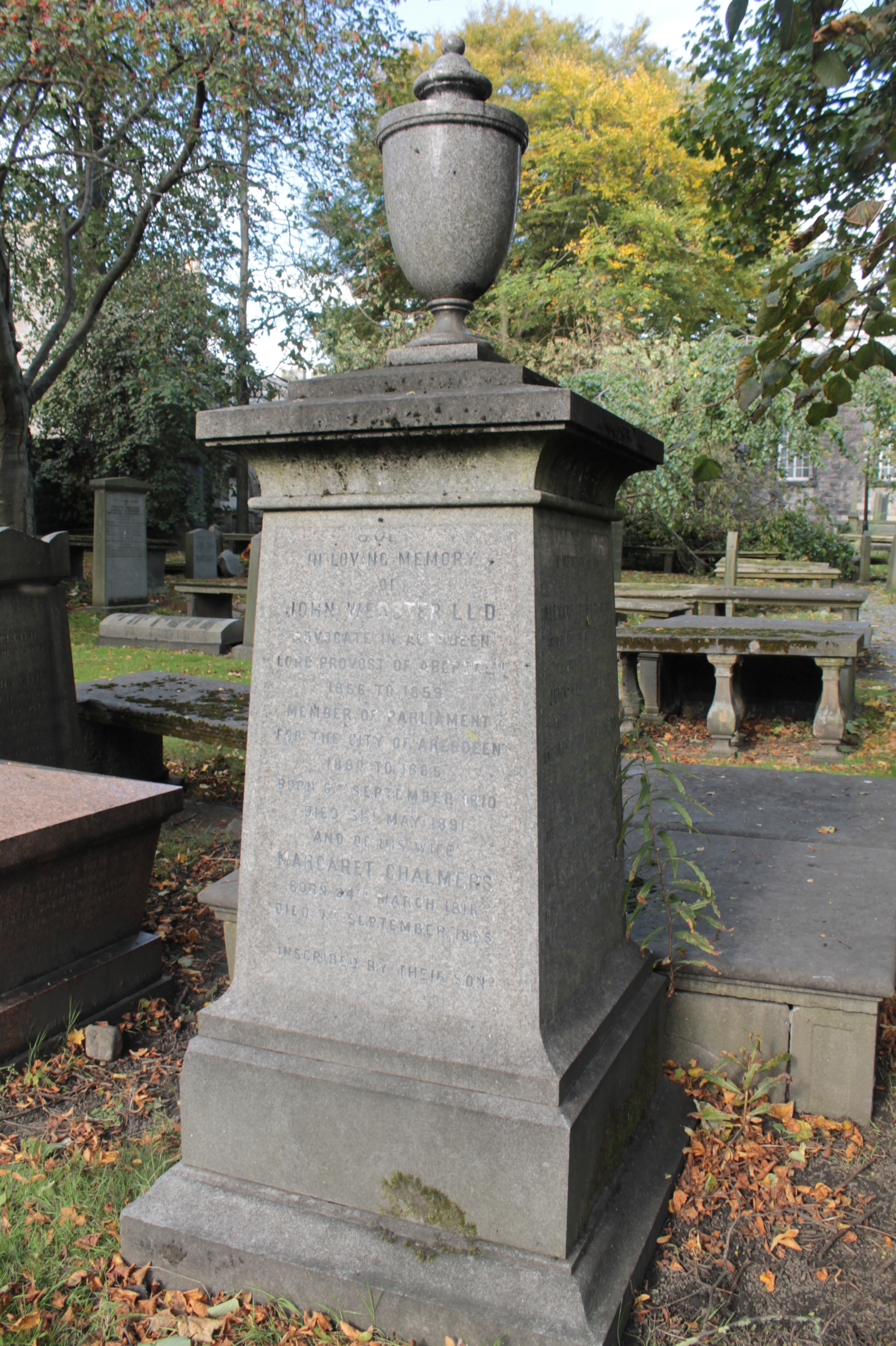
The grave of John Webster MP, churchyard of the Kirk of St Nicholas

Webster was born on 6 September 1810 the eldest son of Alexander Webster, an advocate of Aberdeen, and his wife Margaret McKilligan, daughter of James McKilligan. He was educated at Marischal College and the University of Aberdeen. He became an advocate in Aberdeen and was a J.P. and Deputy Lieutenant for Aberdeenshire. From 1856 to 1859 he was Lord Provost of Aberdeen. He was also chairman of the Scottish Provincial Assurance Company and a member of the University Court of Aberdeen University. He was awarded LLD in 1877.

At the 1880 general election Webster was elected Member of Parliament for Aberdeen. He held the seat until 1885 when it was divided under the Redistribution of Seats Act 1885.

Webster died at the age of 80. He is buried in the churchyard of the Kirk of St Nicholas on Union Street in Aberdeen.

== Family ==
Webster married Margaret Chalmers (1816-1895) daughter of David Chalmers of Westburn Aberdeen in 1839.

Parliament of the United Kingdom
Preceded by John Farley Leith	Member of Parliament for Aberdeen; 1880 – 1885	constituency abolished
Civic offices
Preceded by Thomas Blaikie	Lord Provost of Aberdeen; 1856–1859	Succeeded by Alexander Anderson
