= Andrew Moir (anatomist) =

Scottish anatomist

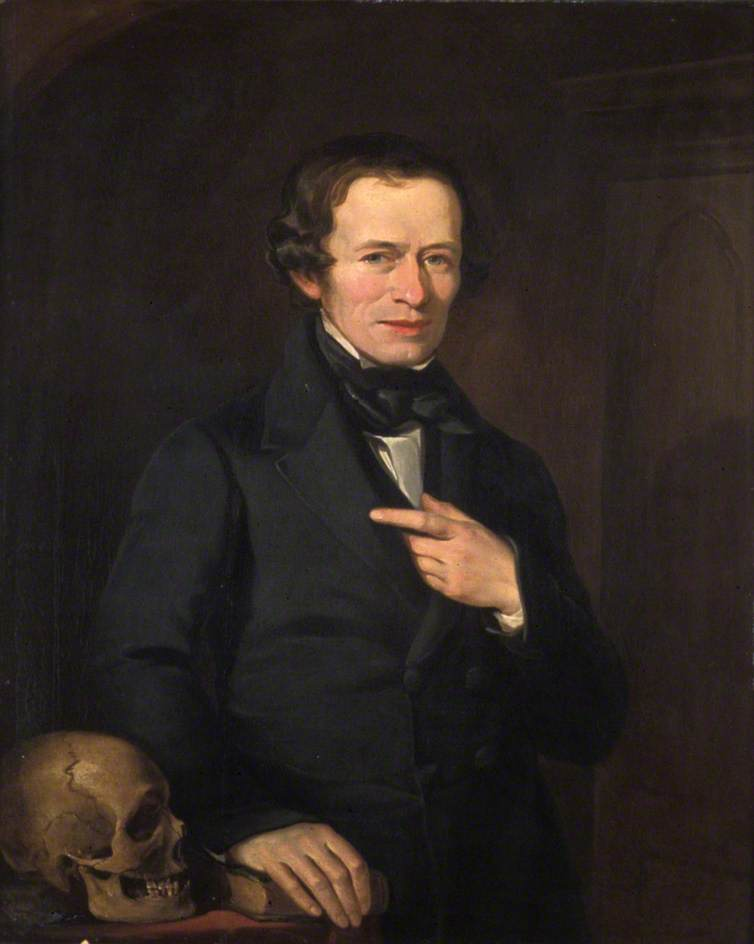
Portrait by James Cassie

Andrew Moir (1806–1844) was a 19th-century Scottish anatomist linked to the body-snatching scandal which swept Scotland in the late 18th and early 19th century.

Unlike his Edinburgh equivalent, Dr Robert Knox, Moir was said to have actively undertaken body-snatching himself. This is highly unlikely, but the strange stories that surround Moir extend into the 21st century due to illogical thinking and bad reporting.

== Life ==
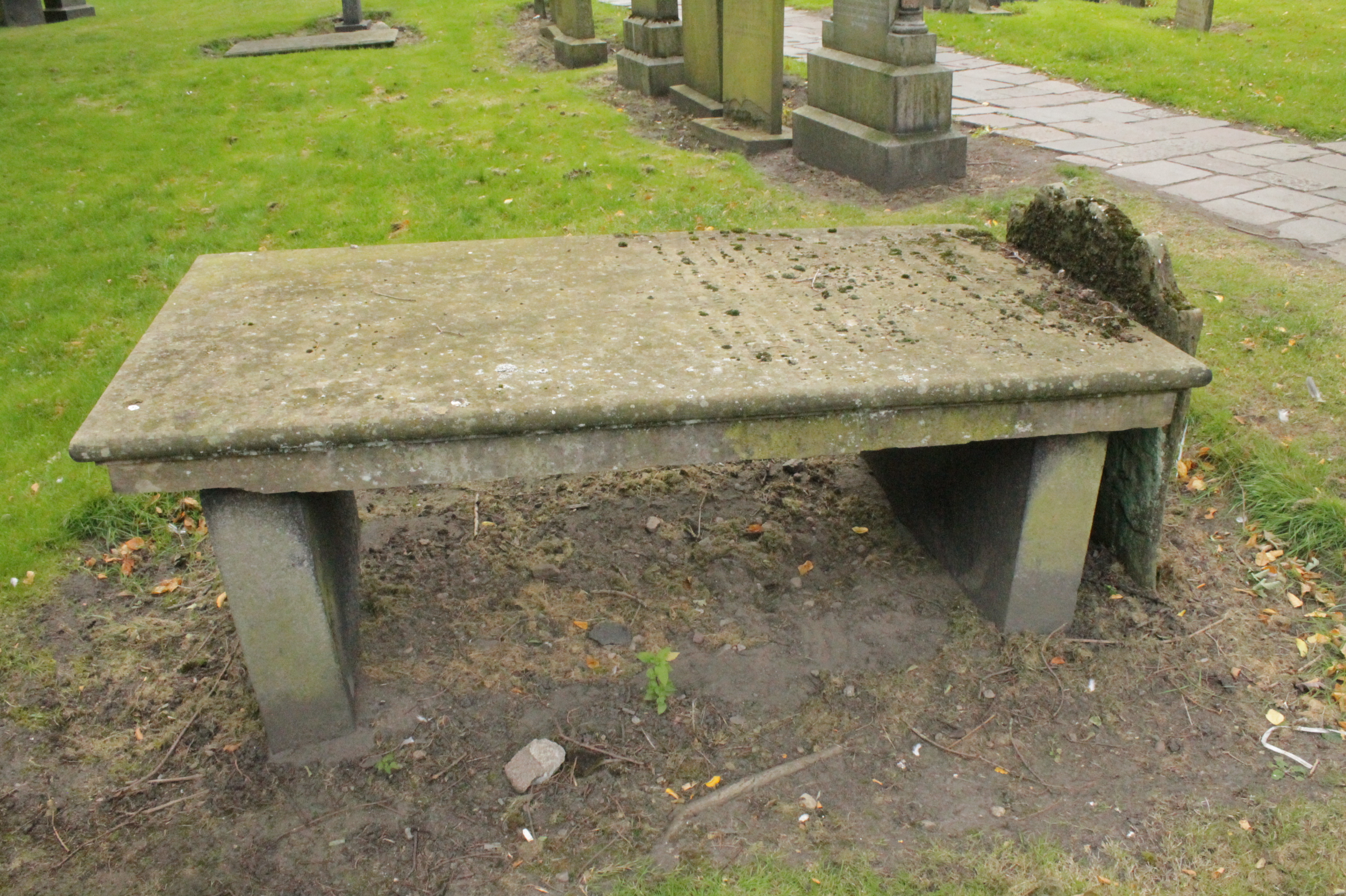
The grave of Dr Andrew Moir, churchyard of the Kirk of St Nicholas

He was born in Aberdeen in 1806. He was probably the son of Dr James Moir of 9 Carmelite Street.

He studied medicine at King's College graduating MA in 1826. He then went to London, where he became a member of the Royal College of Surgeons in 1828. He then returned to Aberdeen and opened a new anatomy room with some other surgeons.

Dr Moir lectured in anatomy at King's College, Aberdeen.

Following the exposure of the Burke and Hare murders in Edinburgh in 1828, anatomists came under scrutiny, and the anatomy rooms were nicknamed "Burkin' Houses" by the public, relating to the newly created verb "to burke". The actions initially resulted in the Offences Against the Person Act 1828.

However, stories relating to Moir, such as his finding "a body" on the surface, whilst bodysnatching in a graveyard, and the body "recovering" because they were only drunk, hold no water at all. It must be remembered Moir was a qualified surgeon and would know a dead body from a live body. What appears to have happened is a mythology has built up, based on very little, and worsened by Moir's early death, offering him no chance of self-defence. This is sad, as the actual evidence indicates a highly capable anatomist.

In December 1831 a crowd burned down the anatomy rooms (the Burkin Hoose). Although three of the rioters were imprisoned, Moir escaped punishment and continued to work. This indicates that much of the stories were fanciful. The estimates of the crowd at 20,000 are equally ludicrous, as it would not be possible to place this number in the adjacent streets around the anatomy room. This figure would also represent 100% of the adult Aberdeen population at that time. A more realistic figure is probably 200 persons.

The Anatomy Act 1832 regularised the whole situation, allowing parish councils to give the bodies of paupers for dissection, immediately stemming the demand for body-snatching.

It is not "impossible" that Moir partook in body-snatching between the critical dates of 1828 and 1832. It is, however, unlikely. The stories appear more a product of public outrage. What is more likely (as it was accepted throughout the anatomy profession) was that the bodies received were not all legitimate bodies as these only included executed criminals, and the demand far outstripped the supply. It appears that all anatomists prior to 1832 were happy to "turn a blind eye" to where bodies were obtained. In terms of the authorities and prosecution, even the highly culpable Robert Knox avoided prosecution. Indeed, no anatomist had any charges raised against them, despite their knowing collusion.

In 1843 his lecture rooms are listed as Kingsland Place and Flourmill Lane, and he lived at 63 Guestrow.

He died of typhoid in February 1844, aged only 38, and is buried in the church of the Kirk of St Nicholas. His grave is an old-fashioned table stone on the east side of the path near the north entrance to the churchyard.
