= Mitford Mitchell =

Scottish minister (1843–1914)

James Robert Mitford Mitchell (1843–1914) was a Scottish minister. He served as Moderator of the General Assembly of the Church of Scotland in 1907. He was Chaplain in Ordinary in Scotland to both Queen Victoria and King Edward VII.

== Life ==
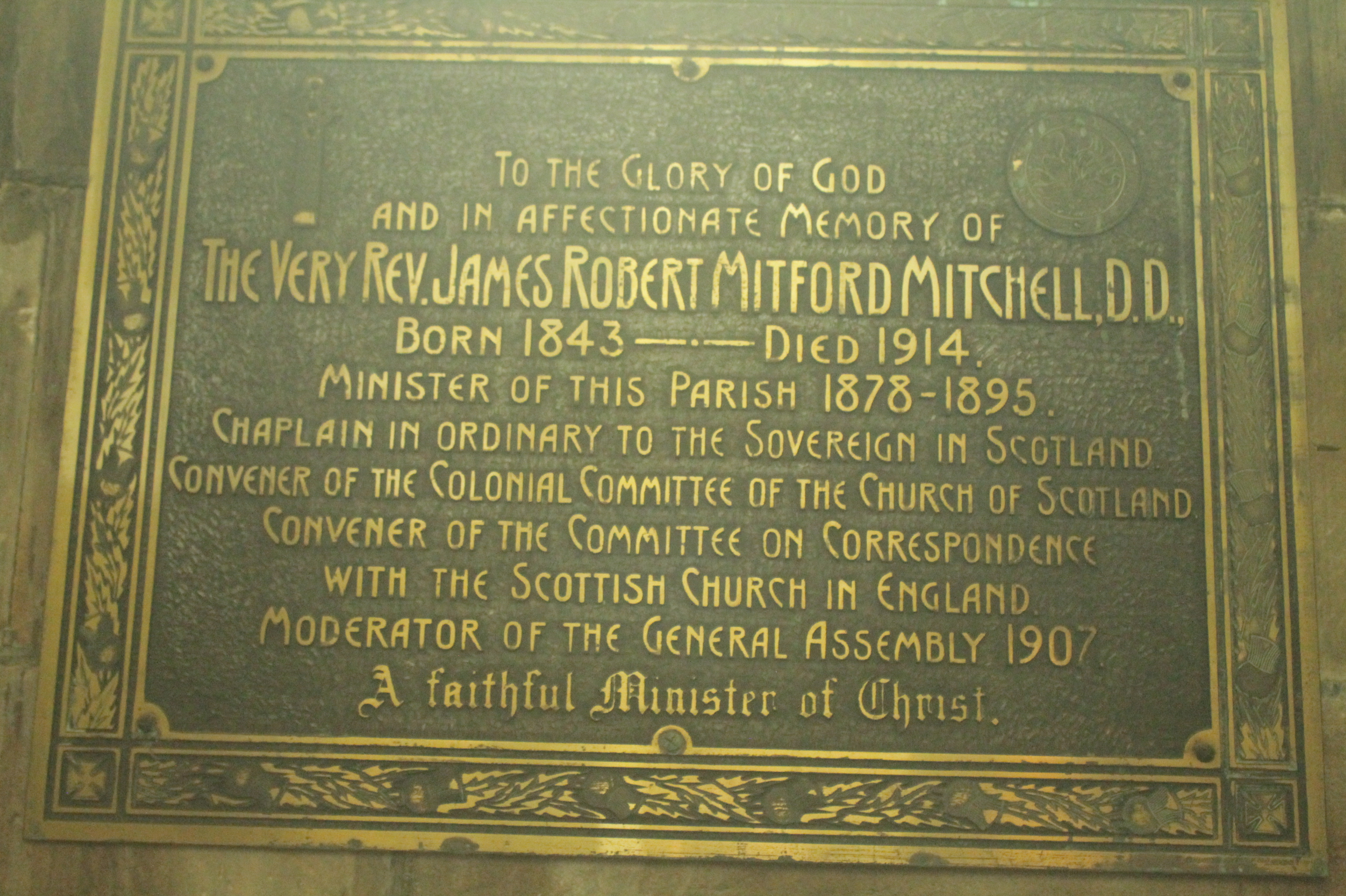
Plaque to Rev Mitford Mitchell, Kirk of St Nicholas, Aberdeen

He was born on 20 February 1843 in Inverness the son of the civil engineer, Joseph Mitchell and educated at Inverness Academy and Merchiston Castle School in Edinburgh. He studied divinity at Edinburgh and Cambridge University. He was ordained as a Church of Scotland minister at Kirkmichael in August 1868. He was translated to Paisley Abbey in September 1875.

He was further translated to the West Kirk of St Nicholas in Aberdeen in February 1878. In September 1888 he took on the additional role as Chaplain to Queen Victoria in Scotland and on her death he became Chaplain to King Edward VII. He was awarded a Doctor of Divinity by Aberdeen University in February 1892.

In 1883 he presented a marble bust of his father, by Alexander Munro to Inverness Town Hall. From 1898 until 1909 he was Convenor of the Church of Scotland's Colonial Committee.

He retired to Edinburgh living at 39 Palmerston Place.

He died on 26 September 1914.

== Recognition ==
A plaque to his memory was erected in the Kirk of St Nicholas around 1920.

== Family ==
In November 1876 he married Agnes Jane Dobbie (d.1909) of Gyleburn near Dumfries. They had one daughter: Christian Elisabeth Mitchell born 1878 who married a Major Stafford.
