= Alexander Robertson of Glasgowego =

Alexander Robertson of Glasgowego (1703 – 20 November 1775) was an Aberdeen merchant who was three times Provost of Aberdeen.

== Life ==
Little is known of his life. He was the son of James Robertson, a merchant and Baillie in Aberdeen.

In later records (in the sale of Glasgowego in 1780), Robertson is referred to as a "merchant in Porto" from which it can be surmised that he was probably a wine merchant.

In 1740 he was elected Provost of Aberdeen in place of William Chalmers. He was elected a second time in 1748 and a third time in 1756, each being a two year term of office.

Around 1747 he purchased the estate of Glasgowego for £800 from William Mollyson, a merchant in Aberdeen and son of Alexander Mollyson (d. 1736), magistrate in Old Aberdeen.

He married Jean Strachan and they had nine children six of whom died in infancy. Robertson's daughter, Elizabeth Robertson (1727–1753), married Robert Pollock, Principal of Marischal College in Aberdeen. A second daughter Jean Robertson (d. 1773) married Alexander Lumsden, advocate in Aberdeen. Following the death of Jean Strachan, Robertson married Jean Rose of Kilravock.

Robertson died on 20 November 1775, aged 72.

The name Glasgowego was later changed to Kinellar.

Civic offices
Preceded by William Chalmers	Lord Provost of Aberdeen; 1740–1742	Succeeded by Alexander Aberdein
Preceded by William Chalmers	Lord Provost of Aberdeen; 1748–1750	Succeeded by Alexander Livingstone
Preceded by William Mowat	Lord Provost of Aberdeen; 1756–1758	Succeeded by John Duncan
