= Kinellar =

Ancient human settlement in Aberdeenshire, Scotland

Coordinates: 57°12′23″N 2°19′02″W

Kinellar is a small settlement in Aberdeenshire, Scotland, located between Kintore and Dyce, near the A96 road.

The parish church lies on or close to a Druidic circle that has been largely eradicated, though two stones are incorporated into the churchyard wall. An ancient chapel stood in the centre of the circle, suggesting the site may have had a religious function for several millennia. An aerial photograph taken in 1978 shows the circle mainly south of the churchyard, intersecting its south wall.

In pre-Reformation times the parish was linked to Kinkell, and this connection lasted until 1649. The old parish church has a font dated 1534, and its bell tower was erected in 1615. The church was replaced by a new building in 1801.

== People from Kinellar ==
- Alexander Robertson of Glasgowego, three times Provost of Aberdeen
- John Row (minister, born 1598)
- Alexander F. I. Forbes (1879–1951), astronomer
