= Margaret Farquhar =

Scottish politician (1930–2026)

Margaret Elizabeth Farquhar, (14 March 1930 – 26 February 2026) was a Scottish politician who was the first woman to serve as Lord Provost of Aberdeen.

== Life and career ==
Born in Aberdeen as Margaret Burnett, she was educated at Broomhill Primary, Ruthrieston Secondary School and then at Webster's College. In July 1948, she became a clerk at the North of Scotland College of Agriculture, and then with a hauliers' firm. In 1951 she married William Farquhar. and went on to have a family and grandchildren. Her husband died on 31 October 1992.

In 1971, Farquhar was elected to Aberdeen District Council, representing the Northfield [or Cumming's Park] ward, as a member of the Scottish Labour Party. She spent time serving on the council's planning committee, and representing the council on a variety of external committees. From 1986, she also served as a director of the Aberdeen Citizens' Advice Bureau. From 1994 to 1996, she was vice-chair of the council.

Farquhar was elected to Aberdeen City Council in 1995, and the following year was elected as Lord Provost of Aberdeen, also serving as Lord Lieutenant of Aberdeen. She was the first woman to become Lord Provost of the city. She retired from the council in 1999, remaining on the boards of several local organisations.

She was appointed a Commander of the Order of the British Empire (CBE) in the 1999 New Year Honours for services to local government.

After political life, she was awarded honorary Doctorates from both Aberdeen and Robert Gordon Universities.

Farquhar died on 26 February 2026, at the age of 95.

Civic offices
Preceded by James Wyness	Lord Provost of Aberdeen; 1996–1999	Succeeded by Margaret Elizabeth Smith
