= Gavin Hadden (provost) =

Scottish provost (1770–1857)

Gavin Hadden (1770–1857) was a merchant who served as Lord Provost of Aberdeen for four non-consecutive periods between 1820 and 1833.

== Life ==
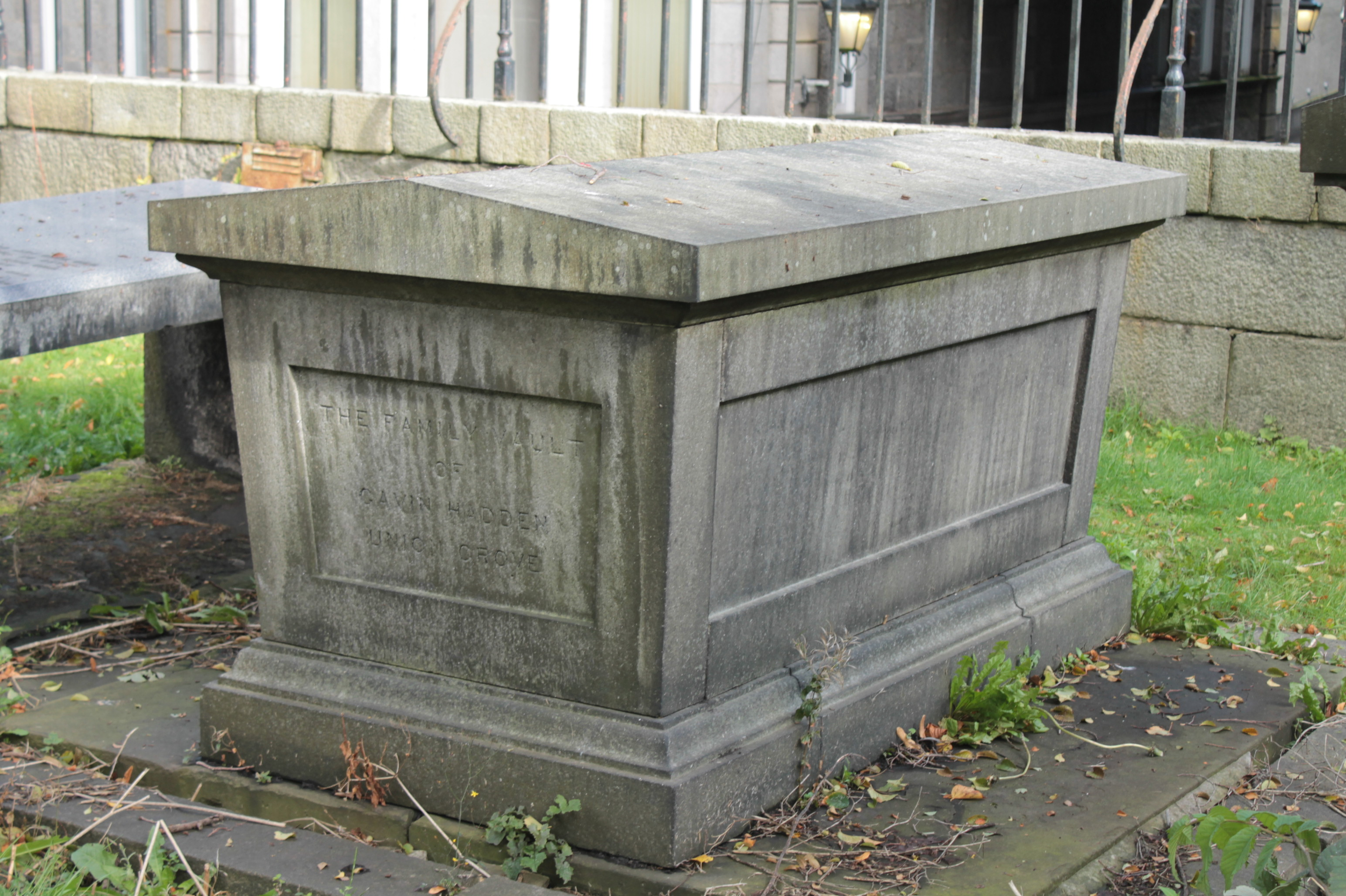
The grave of Gavin Hadden, churchyard of the Kirk of St Nicholas

He was born in Aberdeen on 4 May 1770, the son of city bailie Alexander Hadden (1721-1793) and his wife Elspeth Young (1737-1804). His younger brother, David Hadden came to fame in America.

His father founded the manufacturing firm of "A Hadden & Sons" specialising in carpets, knitwear, hosiery and yarns of which Gavin became a partner. Their main premises (a five-story warehouse) was on The Green just south of Union Street, Aberdeen (now demolished).

In 1796, he collaborated with Robert Eden Scott to create a series of geometrical problems and theorems for the students at the University of Aberdeen.

Around 1810, Hadden became a city Bailie and was elected Provost for the first time in 1820. His older brother, James Hadden had been Provost from 1813 to 1815. He then spent every two years alternating as Provost, twice followed by Alexander Broewn, and once (1830) by his nephew James Hadden. He stood down in 1833 midway through his final term and was replaced by James Blaikie.

From 1821 to 1833 he was an assessor of students at Marischal College.

He retired from all active roles in 1833 and died on 12 June 1857 at Union Grove in Old Aberdeen. He is buried in the churchyard of the Kirk of St Nicholas in central Aberdeen. The grave lies in the south-east corner of the churchyard.

== Family ==
He was married to Hope Innes (1778-1857) and they had at least nine children.

Civic offices
Preceded by Alexander Brebner	Lord Provost of Aberdeen; 1820–1822	Succeeded by Alexander Brown
Preceded by Alexander Brown	Lord Provost of Aberdeen; 1824–1826	Succeeded by Alexander Brown
Preceded by Alexander Brown	Lord Provost of Aberdeen; 1828–1830	Succeeded by James Hadden
Preceded by James Hadden	Lord Provost of Aberdeen; 1832–1833	Succeeded by James Blaikie
