= William Cruden (provost) =

Scottish merchant

William Cruden (1726–1807) was a Scottish merchant who twice served as Lord Provost of Aberdeen.

== Life ==
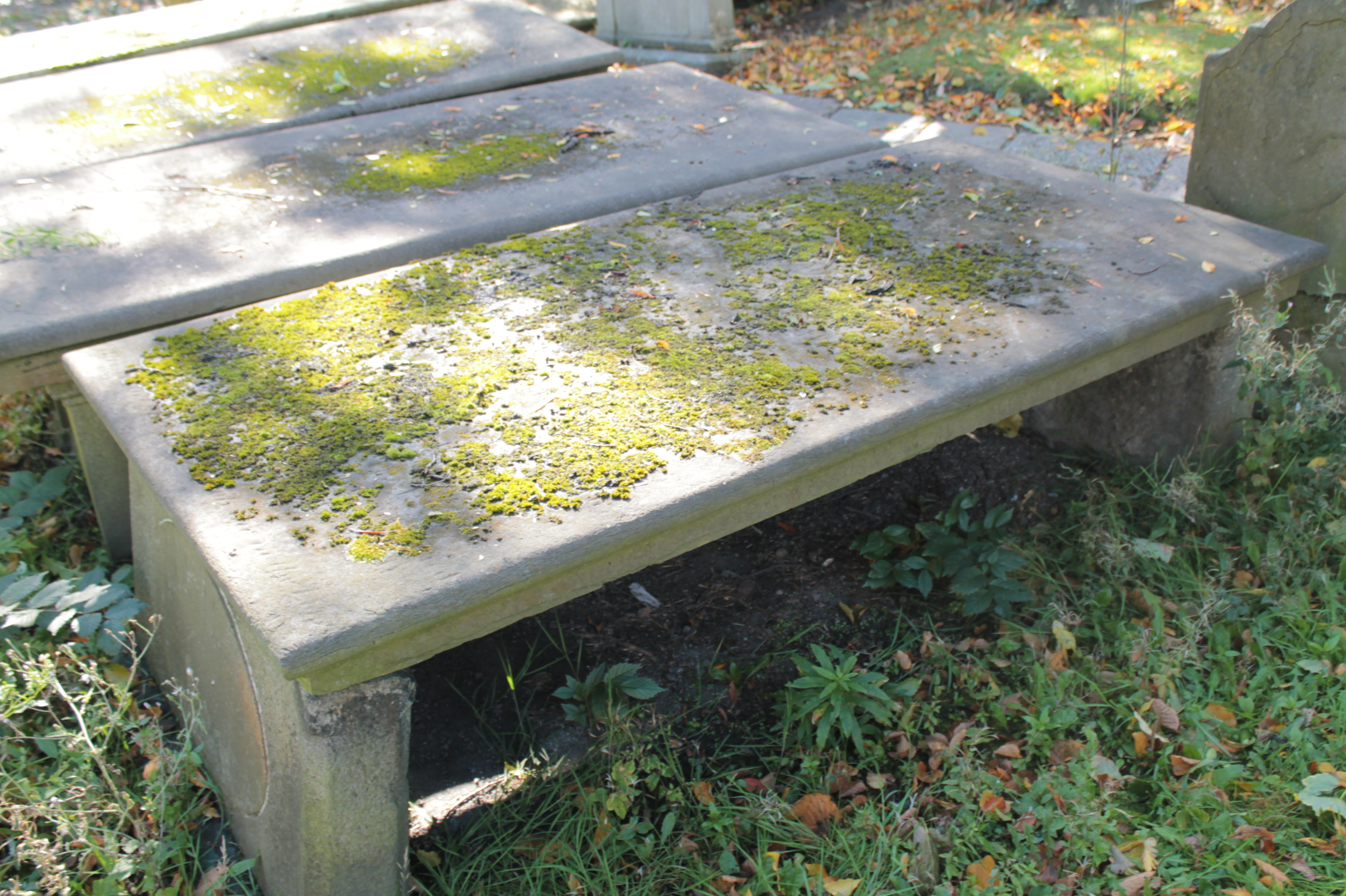
The grave of Cruden, churchyard of the Kirk of St Nicholas

He was born in the parish of Strichen in northern Aberdeenshire the son of a William Cruden (b.1703) a farmer, and his wife, Anna Phaans (1700–1780). His brothers included David Cruden of Nigg, and George Cruden, who went to Aberdeen with William as a merchant.

Around 1745 he moved to Aberdeen and gained a reputation as a cloth merchant. He became a city burgess and was appointed Chief Magistrate of Aberdeen. He was first elected Lord Provost of Aberdeen in 1784 in place of William Young, serving the standard two years in this role. In 1789 he was elected for the second time, serving until 1791.

He died on 23 December 1807 and is buried in the churchyard of the Kirk of St Nicholas in central Aberdeen.

== Family ==
He was first married to Katherine Murdoch (1718–1758) with whom he had four sons and two daughters. He next married Elizabeth Farquharson (1730–1790).

Civic offices
Preceded by William Young	Lord Provost of Aberdeen; 1784–1786	Succeeded by James Jopp
Preceded by John Abercrombie	Lord Provost of Aberdeen; 1789–1791	Succeeded by George Auldjo
