= Alexander Anderson (provost) =

Scottish advocate and politician (1802–1887)

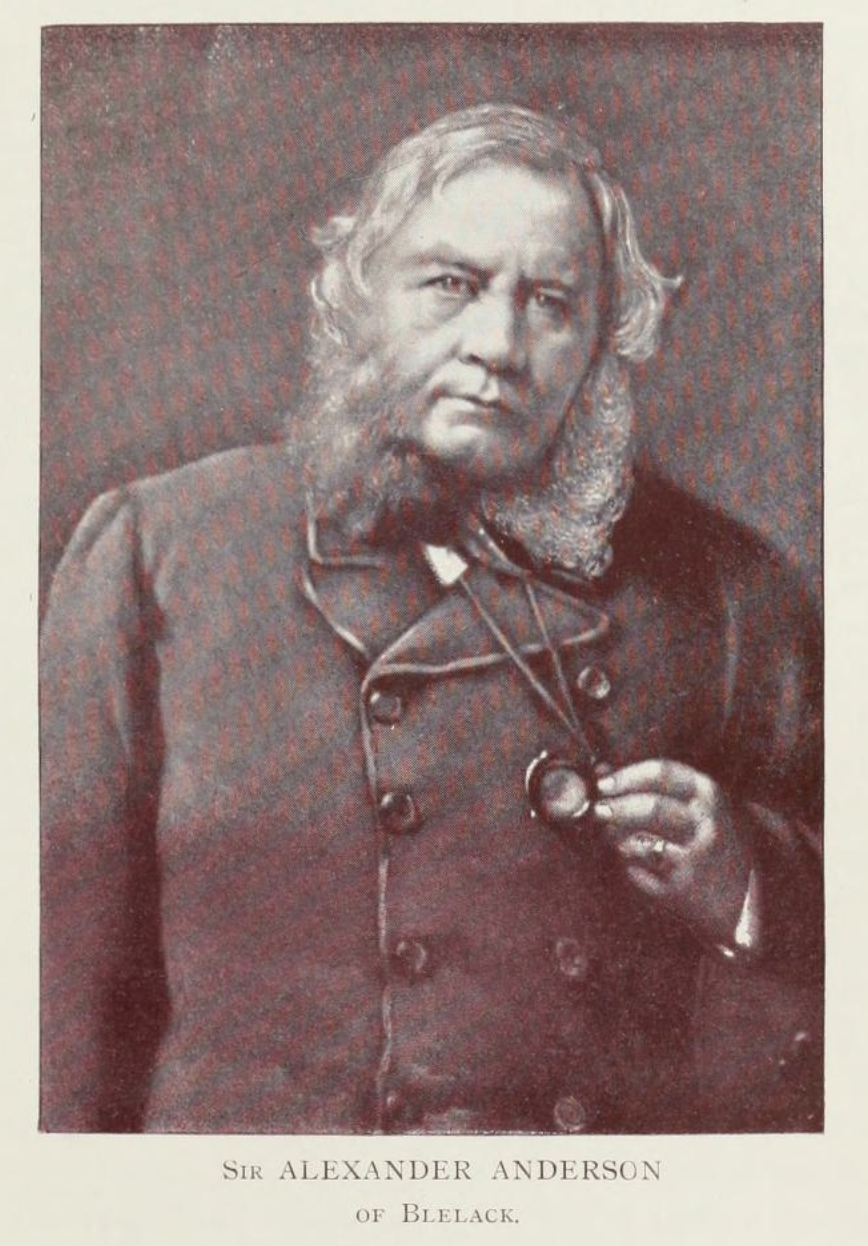

Alexander Anderson of Blelack (1802–1887) was a Scottish advocate and politician who served as Lord Provost of Aberdeen from 1859 to 1866.

== Life ==
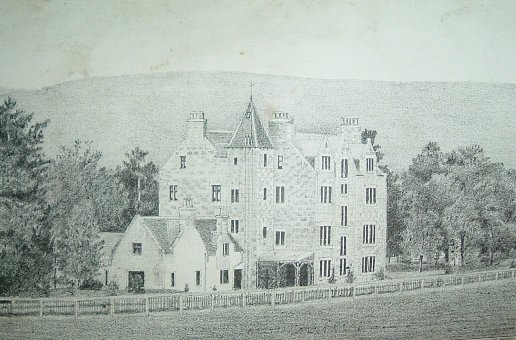
Blelack House in 1896

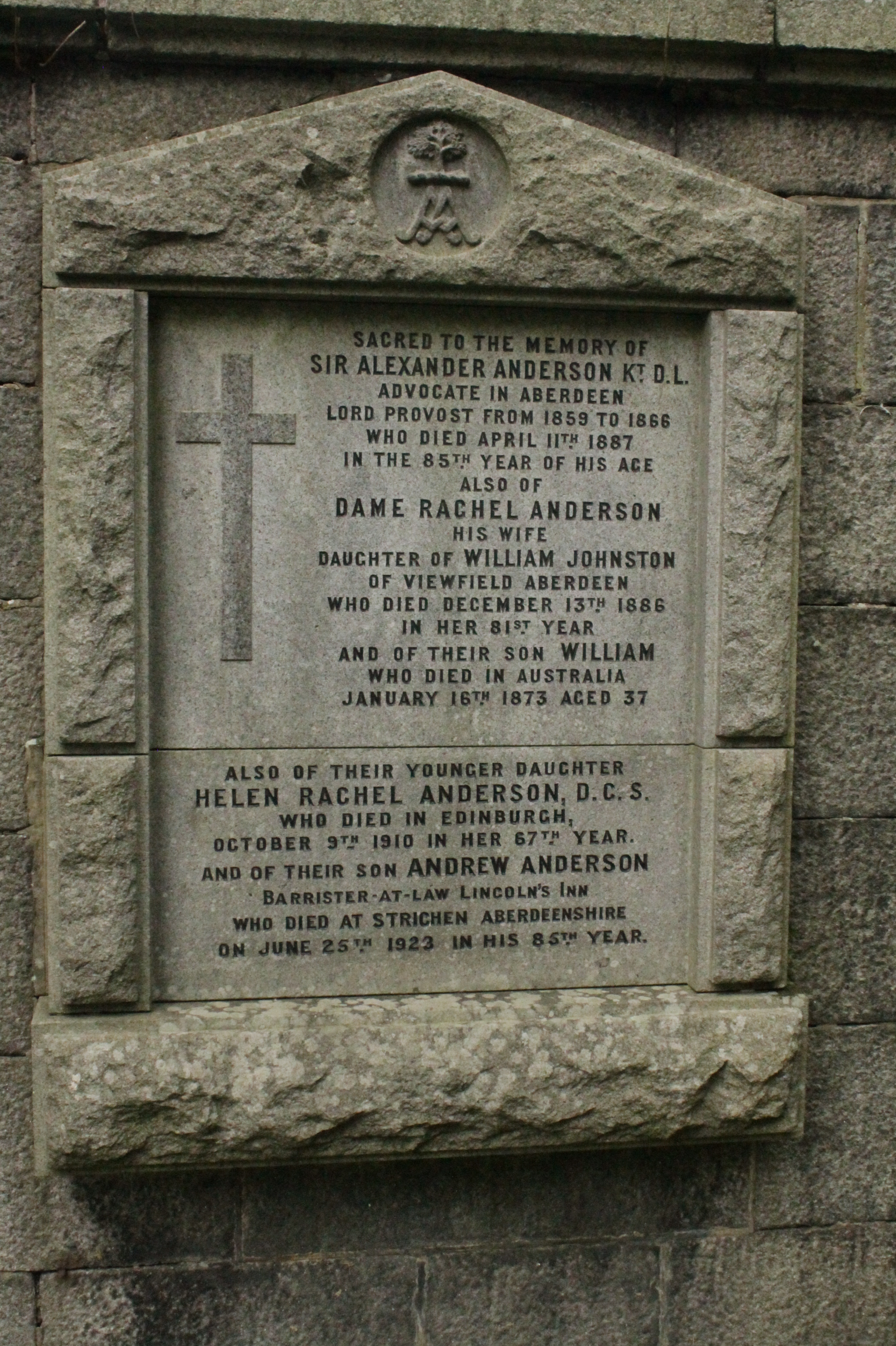
The grave of Sir Alexander Anderson, Kirk of St Nicholas

He was born in Strichen manse on 10 June 1802, the son of Rev Alexander Anderson, and his wife, Helen Findlay. He was educated at Aberdeen Grammar School then studied law at Marischal College, Aberdeen, graduating MA in 1819. In 1827, he was created an advocate.

In 1830 he was operating as an advocate from 25 Marischal Street in Aberdeen. He first joined William Adam to create the firm Adam & Anderson. He later created the legal firm of Anderson & Rae. Amongst his non-legal activities he reorganised the Aberdeen Dispensary (which later became Aberdeen Maternity Hospital) and acted as its treasurer for 32 years, and set up the Aberdeen Fire and Life Assurance company in 1836. This was renamed the Northern Assurance company in 1848. He was involved in banking and in the creation (and routing) of the Great North of Scotland Railway (GNSR).

His contribution as Lord Provost included creation of a city-wide water supply and sewerage system. He also organised the construction of the new Council buildings at Castlegate (but it was completed under the following Lord Provost) and extended the harbour.

He was knighted by Queen Victoria on 13 October 1863 during her visit to Aberdeen.

He died at home on 11 April 1897. He is buried in the churchyard of the Kirk of St Nicholas on Union Street. The grave lies against the west boundary wall.

== Family ==
He was married to Rachel Johnston (d.1886), daughter of William Johnston of Viewfield, Aberdeen. Their son William Alexander died in Australia in 1873 aged 37. Their son Andrew Anderson died in 1923 at the ancestral home at Strichen. Their daughter Rachel died in Edinburgh in 1910.

His daughter Catherine Anderson (1835–1918) married Archibald Charteris and was known as Catherine Charteris was a social activist.

== Artistic recognition ==
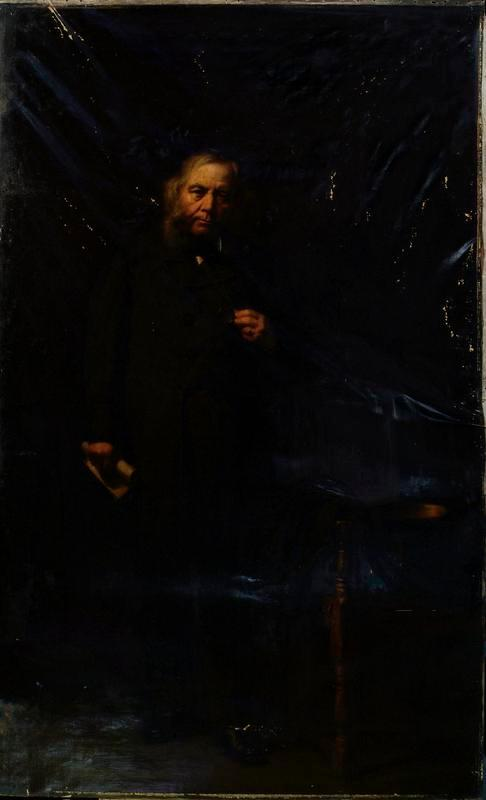
Sir Alexander Anderson of Blelack, Provost of Aberdeen (1859 - 1865) by Sir George Reid

He was portrayed in office by Robert Clouston and George Reid.

Civic offices
Preceded by John Webster	Lord Provost of Aberdeen; 1859–1865	Succeeded by Alexander Nicol
