= George Davison =

George Davison may refer to:

- George Davison (photographer) (1854–1930), English photographer
- George Davison (merchant) (?–1799), Quebecois businessman and political figure
- George Davison (footballer) (1890–?), English footballer
- George M. Davison (1855–1912), American politician from Kentucky
- George Davison (bishop) (born 1965), Irish priest and bishop of Connor

== See also ==
- George Davidson (disambiguation)
