= Agnes Blaikie =

Coordinates: 44.4532°N 33.5619°E

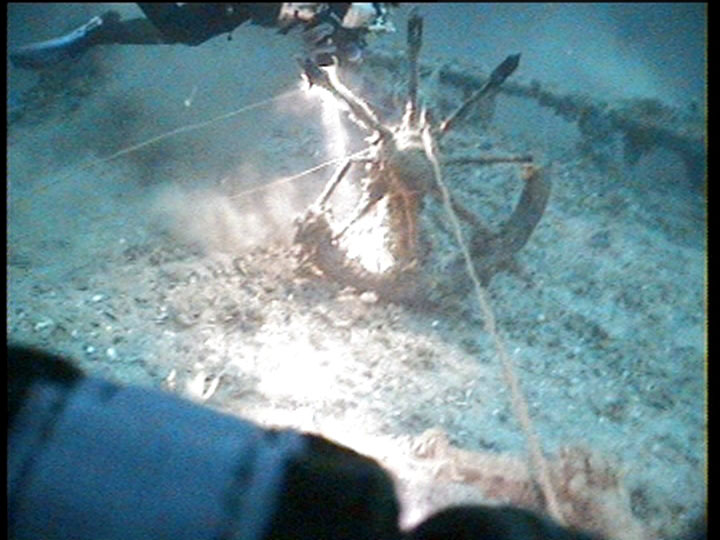
- Steering-wheel of the Agnes Blaikie

History

United Kingdom
- Name: Agnes Blaikie
- Owner: Jordison
- Builder: Walter Hood, Aberdeen
- Launched: October 1841
- Homeport: London
- Fate: Sunk after collision, 5 May 1855

General characteristics
- Type: Trading barque
- Tonnage: 381 long tons (387 t) GRT
- Length: 116 ft 4 in (35.46 m)
- Beam: 23 ft 7 in (7.19 m)
- Depth of hold: 16 ft 10 in (5.13 m)
- Propulsion: Sails
- Sail plan: Barque-rigged
- Complement: 12

Agnes Blaikie was a merchant ship chartered by the British government during the Crimean War for delivery of military cargoes and equipment to the army which was based in Balaklava. The vessel was presumably named in honour of the wife of the Lord Provost of Aberdeen of Sir Thomas Blaikie.

The Agnes Blaikie was first registered in Aberdeen in 1841, owned by George Thompson Jr. of the Aberdeen Line and commanded by Alex Duthie. Her maiden voyage took her to Santiago de Cuba. It was named after Agnes Blaikie, wife of Thomas Blaikie,

In 1849 she was registered in Swansea, Wales, under the ownership of W. Jenkins and Company. On 30 June 1852 she was bought by John Crow Richardson, and commanded by Thomas Thomas. However she soon changed hands again (perhaps twice), being bought by Henry Dobson, of 81 Princess Street, Bristol, England on 5 February 1853 (That purchase date may be a bit off as Dobson was advertising her voyage from Bristol direct to Melbourne, Port Philip, departure 10 February 1853, in The Times of 22 January 1853). In 1855, now registered in London, she was owned by Jordison, and commanded on her final voyage by Henry Hamden.

Agnes Blaikie sailed from the Thames on 22 January 1855 with a cargo consisting of 180 tons of shot and 250 tons of coke. On 5 May 1855 the barque was sunk off Balaklava, after a collision with the paddle steamer HMS Medina. All of the crew were saved, but it was reported that the petty officer of the watch aboard Medina committed suicide by cutting his throat immediately afterwards.

The wreck of the Agnes Blaikie was discovered lying in 84 metres (276 ft) of water in September 2003, and was formally identified on 13 September 2006.
