= Edward William Watt =

Edward William Watt (1877–1955) was a journalist who served as Lord Provost of Aberdeen 1935/6.

== Life ==
He was born at 134 Crown Street in Aberdeen (close to Aberdeen railway station) in 1877 the son of William Watt, editor of the Aberdeen Free Press, and his second wife, Marjorie Robertson. His mother died from ovarian cancer in 1888 when he was only eleven. He attended Aberdeen Grammar School then studied at Aberdeen University graduating MA and then entering journalism.

In 1910 he was working for the Aberdeen Evening Gazette and living at 33 Carlton Place in Aberdeen.

In the First World War he served as a Lt Colonel in the Gordon Highlanders. Returning to journalism after the war he rose to be Editor of the Evening Gazette by 1922 and was also manager of Aberdeen Newspapers Ltd.

He was elected Lord Provost in 1935 in place of Sir Henry Alexander.

As Lord Provost he was responsible for raising £100,000 by public subscription to build Aberdeen Royal Infirmary at Foresterhill.

On 15 September 1938, after his period as Lord Provost, it was he rather than the then Lord Provost, Sir Thomas Mitchell, who laid the foundation stone of the King George VI Bridge (completed in 1941).

== Depiction in art ==
He was portrayed in 1939 by Harold Knight in military uniform. The portrait is held by Aberdeen Art Gallery and Museum.

== Recognition ==
Provost Watt Drive in Kincorth is named in his memory.

Civic offices
Preceded by Sir Henry Alexander	Lord Provost of Aberdeen; 1935–1936	Succeeded by Sir Thomas Mitchell
