= Blackie (surname) =

Blackie is an English and Scottish surname. Notable people with the surname include:

- Charles Blackie, New Zealand judge
- Don Blackie (1882–1955), Australian cricketer
- Ernest Blackie (1867–1943), English Anglican priest
- Fergus Blackie (1937–2021), Zimbabwean judge and lawyer
- Jeannetta Margaret Blackie (1864–1955), New Zealand governess, teacher and church administrator
- John Stuart Blackie (1809–1895), Scottish scholar
- Josh Blackie (born 1979), New Zealand rugby union player
- Margery Blackie (1898–1981), British physician
- Sid Blackie (1899–1966), English footballer
