= Alexander Dyce Davidson =

Free Church of Scotland minister

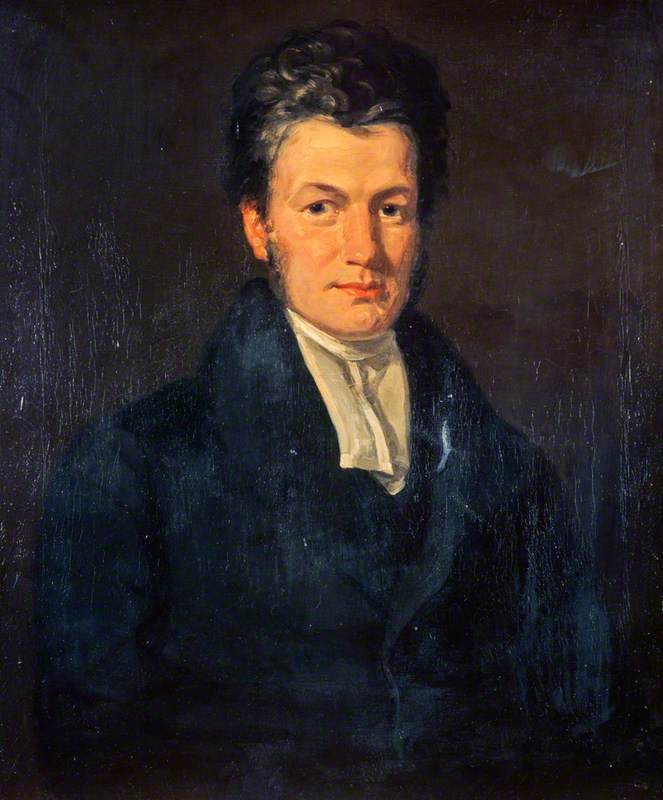
- Alexander Dyce Davidson by John Phillip

Personal details
- Born: 8 May 1807
- Died: 27 April 1872 (aged 64)

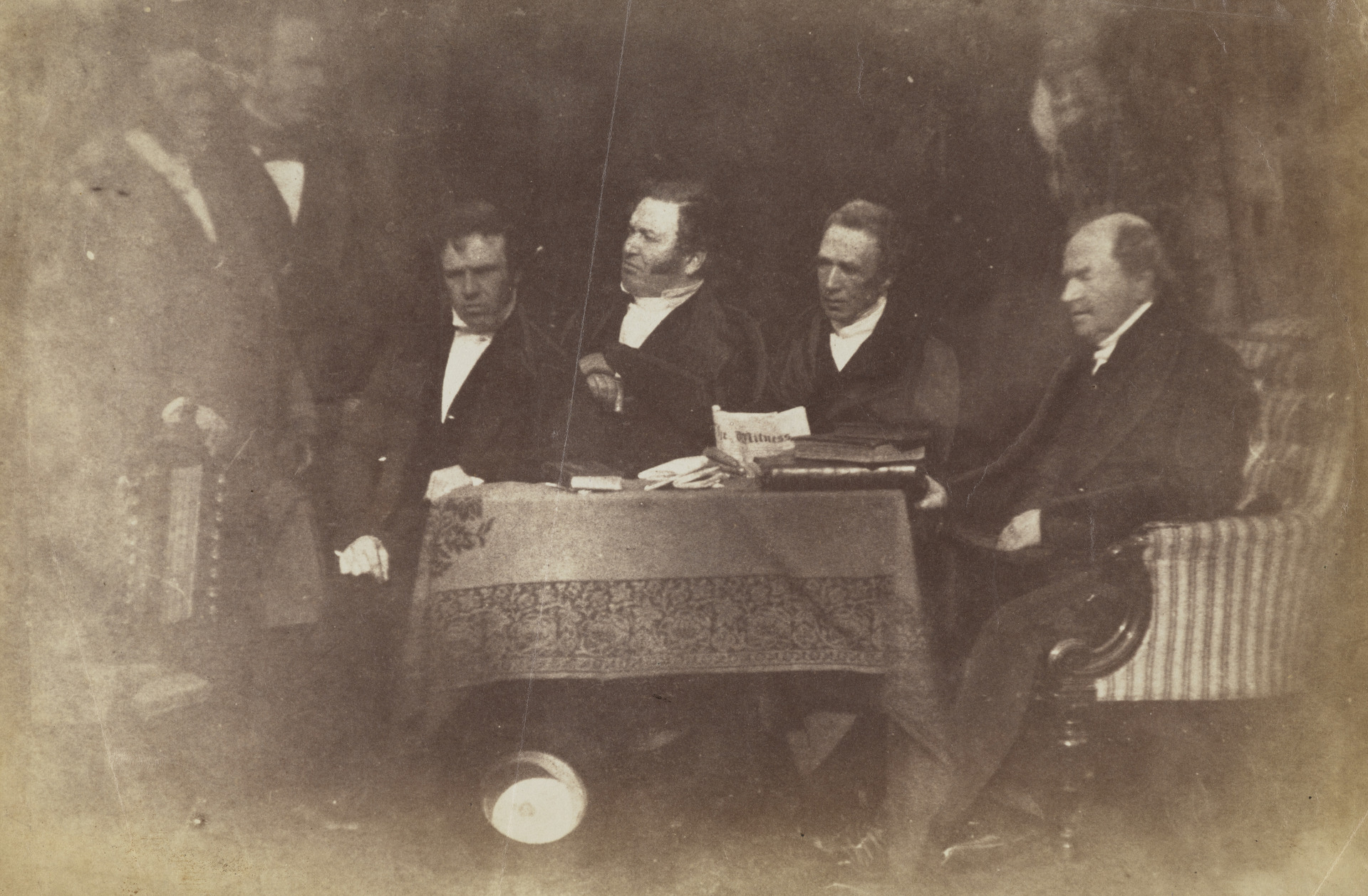
Aberdeen Presbytery by Hill & Adamson

Alexander Dyce Davidson (8 May 1807 – 27 April 1872) was born in Aberdeen in 1807, and spent his life there. He was a key player in the transformation of religious opinion in Aberdeen from ‘moderatism’ to ‘evangelicalism,’ which led to the exodus of the city ministers and congregations at the Disruption of 1843. Davidson led the most influential congregation of the city into the Free Church. Davidson was also an author leaving lectures on the Book of Esther and well as many sermons.

== Early life and education ==
Alexander Dyce Davidson was born in Aberdeen in 1807, and spent his life there. He was the son of George Davidson, wright superintendent of the Devanha Brewery, Aberdeen, and brother of George Davidson, author of Rhyme of St Swithin. He was educated at Aberdeen Grammar School and Marischal College graduating with an MA in 1825. He became tutor in the family of James Blaikie, advocate and provost of Aberdeen.

== Church of Scotland ministry ==
He was licensed to preach by the Presbytery of Aberdeen on 31 March 1830. He was ordained to South Church on 1 August 1832 (in which congregation he had been brought up). He was transferred to the West church in 1836. His popularity as a preacher was very great, and his influence among the students of the university and the more cultured classes was paramount. To him more than to any other was due the transformation of religious opinion in Aberdeen from ‘moderatism’ to ‘evangelicalism,’ which led to the exodus of the city ministers and congregations at the disruption of 1843.

== Free Church ministry ==
Davidson led the most influential congregation of the city into the Free Church, and continued to minister to it with undiminished success, first in Belmont Street, then in a new church in Union Street, till his death in 1872. He devoted himself wholly to pulpit work, taking no part in public affairs. Davidson had the degree of doctor of divinity from his own university on 19 April 1854.

== Death and legacy ==
He died on 27 April 1872 at his house in Crown Street, Aberdeen, and was buried in St Nicholas Churchyard. A lengthy obituary appears in the "Aberdeen Journal," Wednesday, May 1, 1872. He left some two thousand sermons fully written out, a selection from which, with a preface by Dr. F. Edmond, was published after his death. A course of sermons on the Book of Esther was published in 1859.

== Family ==
He married Elizabeth Blaikie 11 August 1840 (died 23 January 1842, aged 23), daughter of James Blaikie of Craigiebuckler, advocate and provost of Aberdeen. Their only daughter, Elizabeth Jane, died less than three years later on 25 November 1844 aged 11 years. Davidson never remarried. An elder brother George Davidson (the literary bookseller), author of "Rhyme of St, Swithin," died 10 May 1872, at Loirsbank, Cults, aged 66. (See obituary "Aberdeen Journal," May 15. 1872.) The youngest brother was Charles Davidson, of the old-established firm of Messrs Davidson and Kay, druggists, Union Street, Aberdeen, who died 26 July 1896, aged 84.

== Works ==
- Address to the Elders of South Parish (Aberdeen, 1834)
- Funeral Sermon, the Death of Provost Blaikie (Aberdeen, 1836)
- The Gospel, the Ministration of the Spirit (Aberdeen, 1839)
- An Action Sermon, 15 October 1843 (Aberdeen, 1843)
- The Position and Duties of Christ's Church (Aberdeen, 1844)
- A Sermon on 7 November 1852 (Aberdeen, 1852)
- Lectures, Expository and Practical, on the Book of Esther (Edinburgh, 1859)
- Sermons [Preface by Francis Edmond] (Edinburgh, 1872)
- Lectures and Sermons (Aberdeen, 1872).
