= George Davidson of Pettens =

17th-century Scottish philanthropist

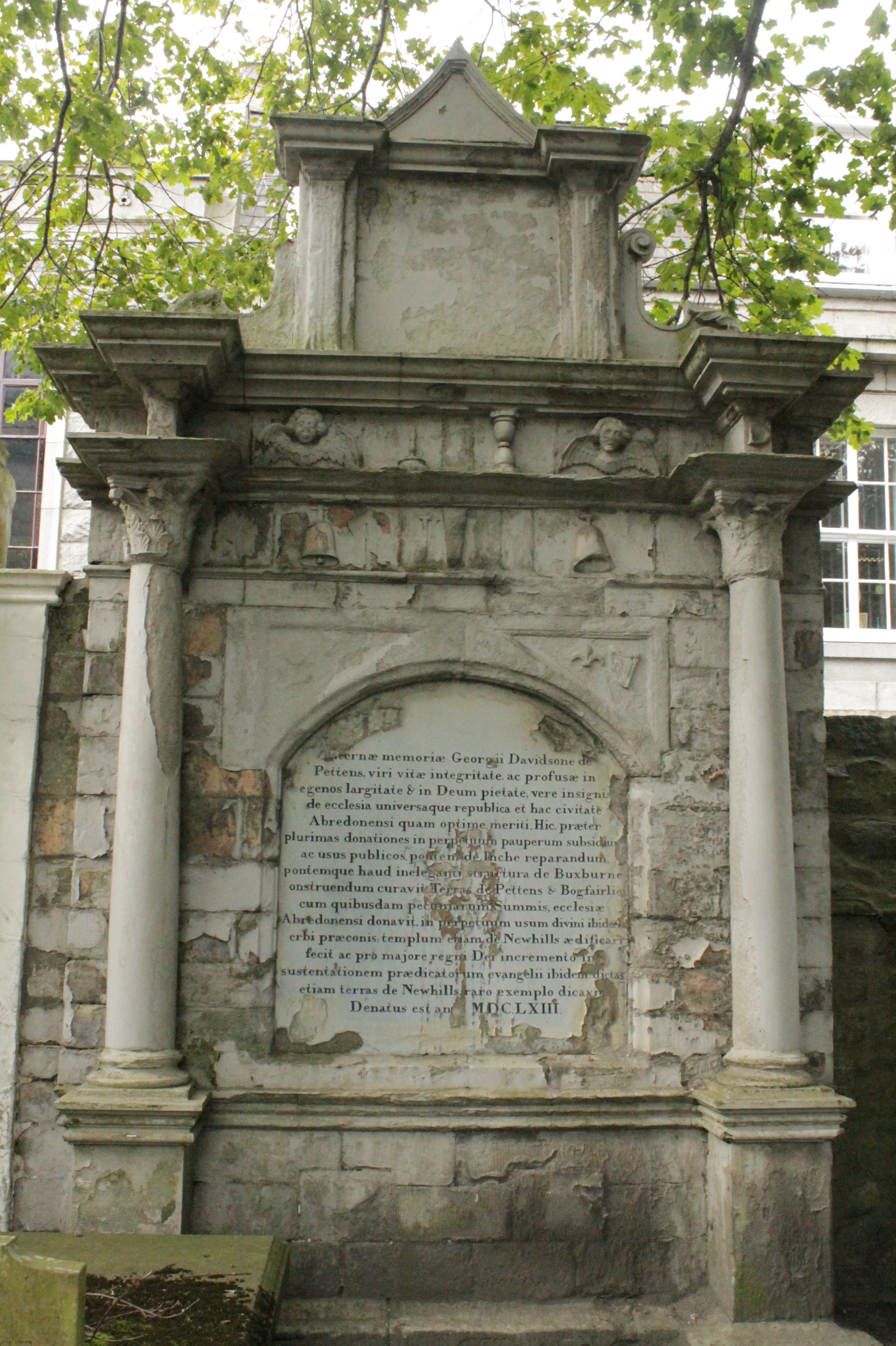
The grave of George Davidson of Pettens at the Kirk of St Nicholas in Aberdeen

George Davidson of Pettens (c. 1593–1663) was a 17th-century Scottish landowner, merchant and philanthropist.

== Life ==
Little is known of his early life but he is thought to be descended from the Davidsons of Cairnbrogie. He was a burgess in Aberdeen from 1650.

He owned the Pettens estate near Balmedie, north of Aberdeen.

He appears to have been a rich merchant in Aberdeen. Having no wife or family he spent much of his money on the city. His works included:

- A new bridge on the River Don in Old Aberdeen.
- Rebuilding the bridge at Insch
- Rebuilding the churchyard walls at St Clements Church in the Footdee district
- Chapel of Ease in the Newhills district
- A fund to aid the ministers of St Clements and St Nicholas

He died in Aberdeen in 1663 and is buried in the churchyard of the Kirk of St Nicholas. His huge monument stands against the west boundary wall towards the north west corner.

== Memorials ==
A stone memorial to him is placed within St Clements Church in Aberdeen.
