= Blackie Lake =

Lake in the state of California, United States

- Location within California
- Location: Madera County, California
- Coordinates: 37°34′46″N 119°22′42″W
- Type: lake

Blackie Lake is a lake located in Madera County, California, in the United States.

Blackie Lake was named for Herb Black, a Department of Fish and Game official.

== See also ==
- List of lakes in California
