= James Blaikie =

British politician (1786–1836)

James Blaikie of Craigiebuckler
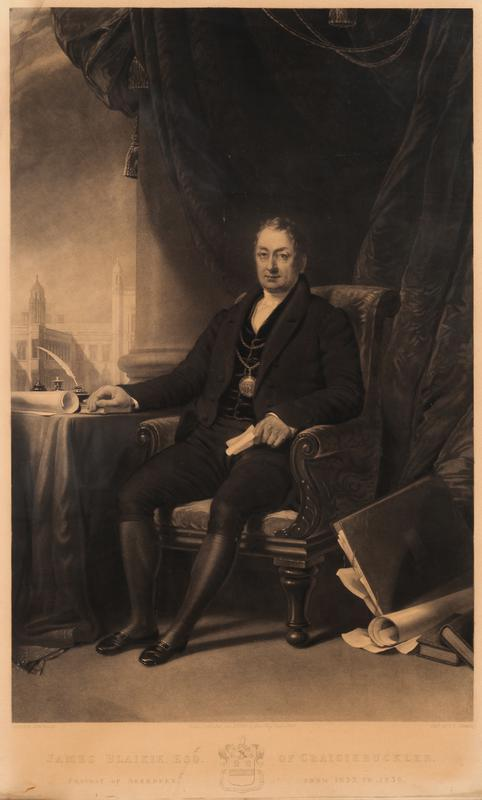
- James Blaikie of Craigiebuckler by Coombs

Provost of Aberdeen
- In office 1833–1835

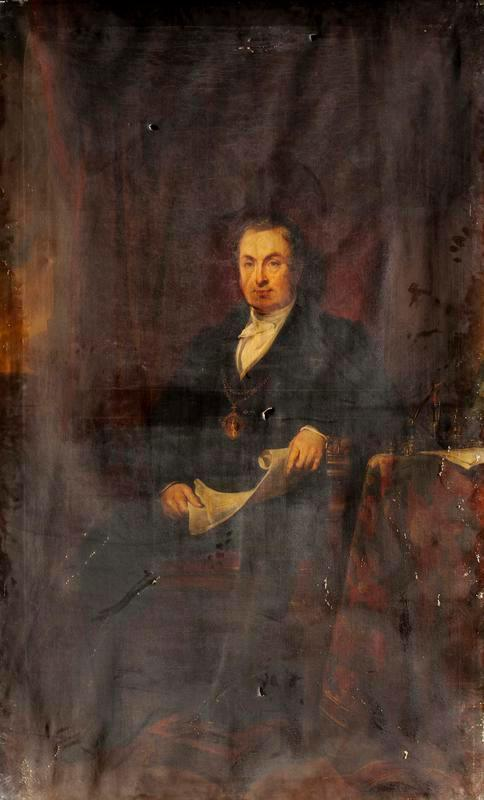
James Blaikie of Craigiebuckler, Provost of Aberdeen (1833–1835) - by John Phillip

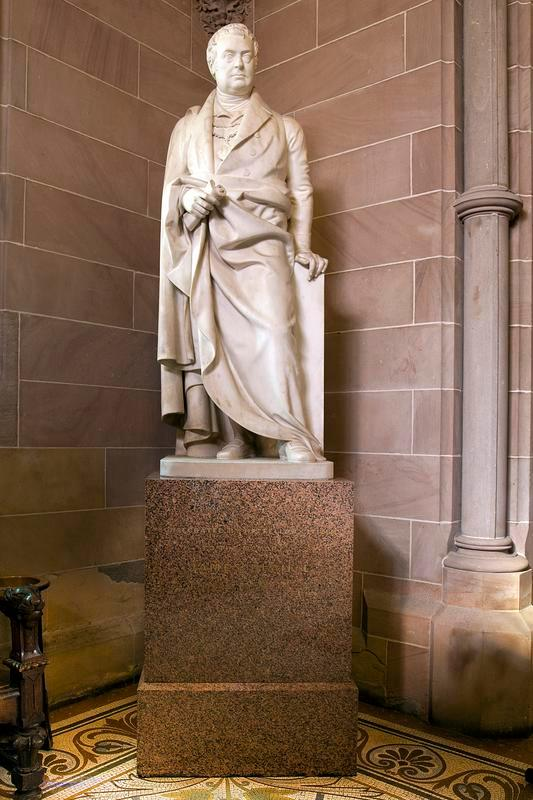
Provost James Blaikie by Sir John Steell

James Ogilvie Blaikie of Craigiebuckler (20 May 1786 – 3 October 1836) was a Scottish lawyer and Provost of Aberdeen from 1833 until 1836.

== Ancestry ==
James Blaikie was a son of John Blaikie, plumber and coppersmith in Aberdeen, by his wife, Helen Richardson. The family belonged originally to the Borders, but certain of them having been engaged in the Jacobite rising of 1715, they came north to Perthshire, under the protection of the Duke of Perth, and settled on a farm near Dunkeld. The Provost's father, John Blaikie, came from Perth to Aberdeen about 1780, and founded the business of John Blaikie & Sons. James was the elder brother of fellow Provost Sir Thomas Blaikie.

== Life and works ==
James Blaikie was born in 1786, studied law, and was admitted a member of the Society of Advocates in Aberdeen in 1808. Provost Blaikie took a great interest in the rebuilding of Marischal College, and it was principally through his exertions and the aid of Alexander Bannerman MP, that the government were finally induced to contribute the sum necessary to make the scheme of rebuilding possible. Their efforts thus brought to a successful issue, the foundation-stone of the new buildings was to have been laid by him during the month in which he died.

Other matters which occupied the attention of the council during the three years above mentioned were the abolition of the office of public executioner; the preparation of a memorial to the Commissioners on Burghs, asking that a stipendiary magistrate be appointed and paid for by government; the demolition of the old East Church, built in the latter quarter of the fifteenth century, and the erection of the present structure. It will be observed that the duration of the office of provost was, under the Royal Burghs (Scotland) Act 1833, altered from two to three years.

== Family ==
He married Jane Garden, a daughter of William Garden, Braco Park, by his wife, Eliza Logie, and had issue-

- John, advocate in Aberdeen, and afterwards of Craigiebuckler
- William Garden Blaikie, D.D., LL.D., Professor of Apologetics and Pastoral Theology in New College, Edinburgh, Moderator of the General Assembly of the Free Church in 1895.
- Anthony Adrian, advocate in Aberdeen, married, 6 July 1852, his cousin, Helen Blaikie, and died in Natal, South Africa, 18 November 1871
- Elizabeth, married in 1840 to Alexander Dyce Davidson, minister of the West Church of S. Nicholas but died young as did their child.

Mrs. Blaikie died on 2 April 1857, in her sixty-third year.

== Death ==
Provost James Blaikie died suddenly in the vestibule of the old Town-House, on 3 October 1836, within a month of completing his third year of office. His character, as sketched by Alexander Dyce Davidson who later married Blaikie's daughter, in the funeral sermon preached by him, was as follows : – " He was a man of thorough integrity, kindliness of heart, and unruffled evenness of temper. He had deep sagacity, clearness and soundness of judgment, and a wondrous faculty of concentrating his whole mind at once on any subject that was presented to him. He was not only a good man and an upright magistrate, but a Christian. His piety was not obtrusive, but deep and genuine." This estimate of the Provost is borne out by the wording of the vote of thanks given to him by the Council in 1835, when he was thanked " for the very able, courteous, and efficient manner in which he had performed the duties of his office." He was buried at St Nicholas, Aberdeen.

== Memorials ==
The memory of Provost Blaikie is still kept green by the statue in marble – one of the earliest works of the late Sir John Steell, R.S.A. – having been removed from Drum's Aisle before the fire of 1874. His portrait, painted by John Phillip, R.A., also hangs in the Town-Hall, and there is also an engraving of the portrait by J. E. Coombs, executed in 1838.

== See also ==
- List of Provosts and Lord Provosts of Aberdeen

Civic offices
Preceded by Gavin Hadden	Lord Provost of Aberdeen; 1833–1836	Succeeded by James Milne
