= Jeannetta Margaret Blackie =

Governess, teacher, church administrator

Jeannetta Margaret Blackie (19 June 1864 – 4 May 1955) was a New Zealand governess, teacher and church administrator. She was born in London, England, on 19 June 1864.
