= James Jopp =

Scottish Provost of Aberdeen (1722–1794)

James Jopp (1722–1794) was a Scottish merchant who served as Provost of Aberdeen for five non-consecutive periods. His meeting with Dr Johnson was recorded in James Boswell's diary.

== Life ==
He was born in Insch, north-west of Aberdeen, on 15 April 1722. He was the son of Andrew Jopp (1675-1742), a tailor and merchant, and his wife Janet Innes.

He moved to Aberdeen around 1745 and made a fortune as a wine and cloth merchant. In 1752 he married Jean Moir (1730-1782), daughter of Rev George Moir minister of Towie, Aberdeenshire. They had eleven children, six of whom survived to adulthood. He became a burgess around 1760, and was first elected Provost in 1768.

On 23 August 1773, midway through his second period in office, in his capacity as Provost, he met Dr Samuel Johnson and his travelling companion, James Boswell and presented Johnson with the Freedom of the City of Aberdeen. Boswell wrote that "Jopp did it with very good grace". They then all dined at the Aberdeen townhouse of Sir Alexander Gordon of Letterfourie, also with Prof John Ross, Prof James Dunbar and Prof Thomas Gordon, all of Aberdeen University.

In 1776 he purchased the Cotton estate from Lady Diana Middleton and was thereafter addressed as James Jopp of Cotton. In 1786 he was elected Provost for the fifth time but stood down in 1787 before the end of the standard two years in office, due to ill-health.

He died in Aberdeen on 7 July 1794.

Civic offices
Preceded by John Duncan	Lord Provost of Aberdeen; 1768–1770	Succeeded by George Shand
Preceded by George Shand	Lord Provost of Aberdeen; 1772–1774	Succeeded by Adam Duff
Preceded by Adam Duff	Lord Provost of Aberdeen; 1776–1778	Succeeded by William Young
Preceded by William Young	Lord Provost of Aberdeen; 1780–1782	Succeeded by William Young
Preceded by William Cruden	Lord Provost of Aberdeen; 1786–1787	Succeeded by John Abercrombie
