= Blackie (nickname) =

Blackie or Blacky is the nickname of:

== People ==
=== Blackie ===
- George Blackburn (American football) (1913–2006), American collegiate football head coach
- Blackie Chen, Taiwanese television host
- Bill Clarkson (1898–1971), Major League Basketball pitcher
- Blackie Collins (1939–2011), American knife maker and designer
- Alvin Dark (1922–2014), Major League Baseball player and manager
- Sam Dente (1922–2002), Major League Baseball player
- Paloma Efron (1912–1977), Argentine journalist and singer
- Blackie Ko (1953–2003), Taiwanese film director, producer, stuntman and actor
- Blackie Lawless (born 1956), American singer
- James T. Licavoli (1904–1985), American mobster
- Gus Mancuso (1905–1984), American Major League Baseball player, coach, scout and radio sports commentator
- E. Blackburn Moore (1897–1980), American politician
- Blackie Sherrod (1919–2016), American journalist and sportswriter
- Carlisle Towery (1920–2012), National Basketball Association and League player

=== Blacky ===
- Joachim Fuchsberger (1927–2014), German actor, television host, lyricist and businessman
- Christian Schwarzer (born 1969), German retired handball player
- Jean-Yves Thériault (born 1962), Canadian bassist for the thrash/progressive metal band Voivod

== Fictional characters ==
- Boston Blackie, created by author Jack Boyle
- "Blackie" Drago, the real name of one of six Marvel Comics villains named The Vulture
- Nelson "Blackie" Hernandez, a recurring character in Narcos who works for the Medellín Cartel and is frequently seen by Escobar's side
- Blackie or Blackford Oakes, protagonist of a series of novels by William F. Buckley Jr.
- Blackie Parrish, on the soap opera General Hospital
- Father John Blackwood "Blackie" Ryan, protagonist of 17 mystery novels by Roman Catholic priest Father Andrew Greeley
- Blackie (クロいの, Kuroino), also called Bear Cat (ヒグマ猫, Higuma Neko), a character from Chi's Sweet Home
