= Blackie (army horse) =

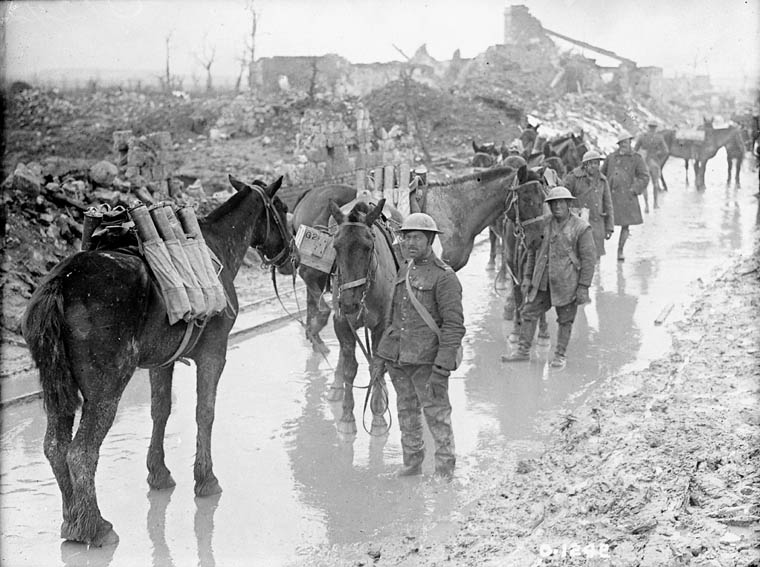
Horses in the First World War

Blackie (1907–1942) was a horse in service with the British Army during the First World War. His grave in Knowsley, Merseyside, became a grade II listed monument in 2017.
