= Thomas Blaikie =

Scottish businessman

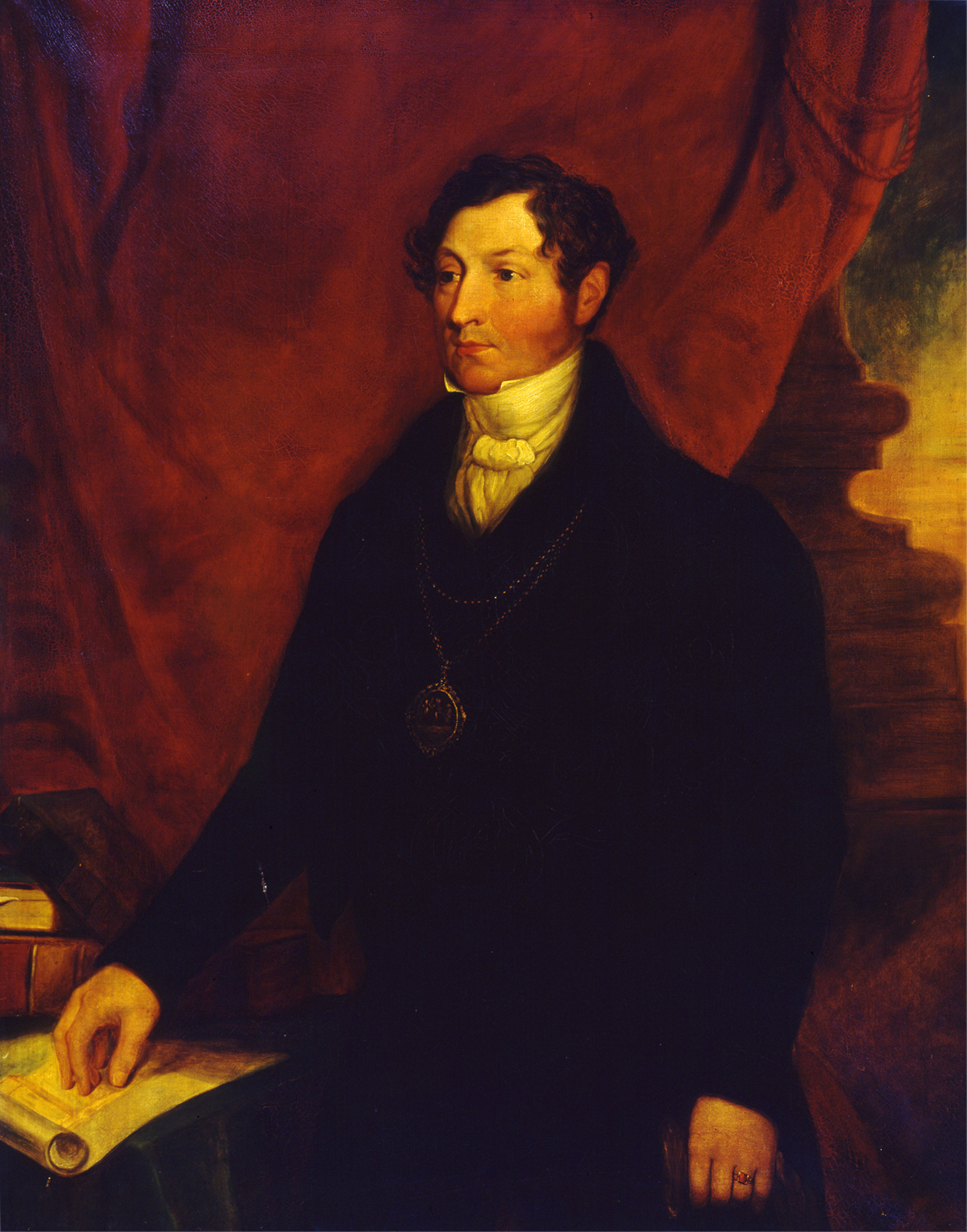
Sir Thomas Blaikie

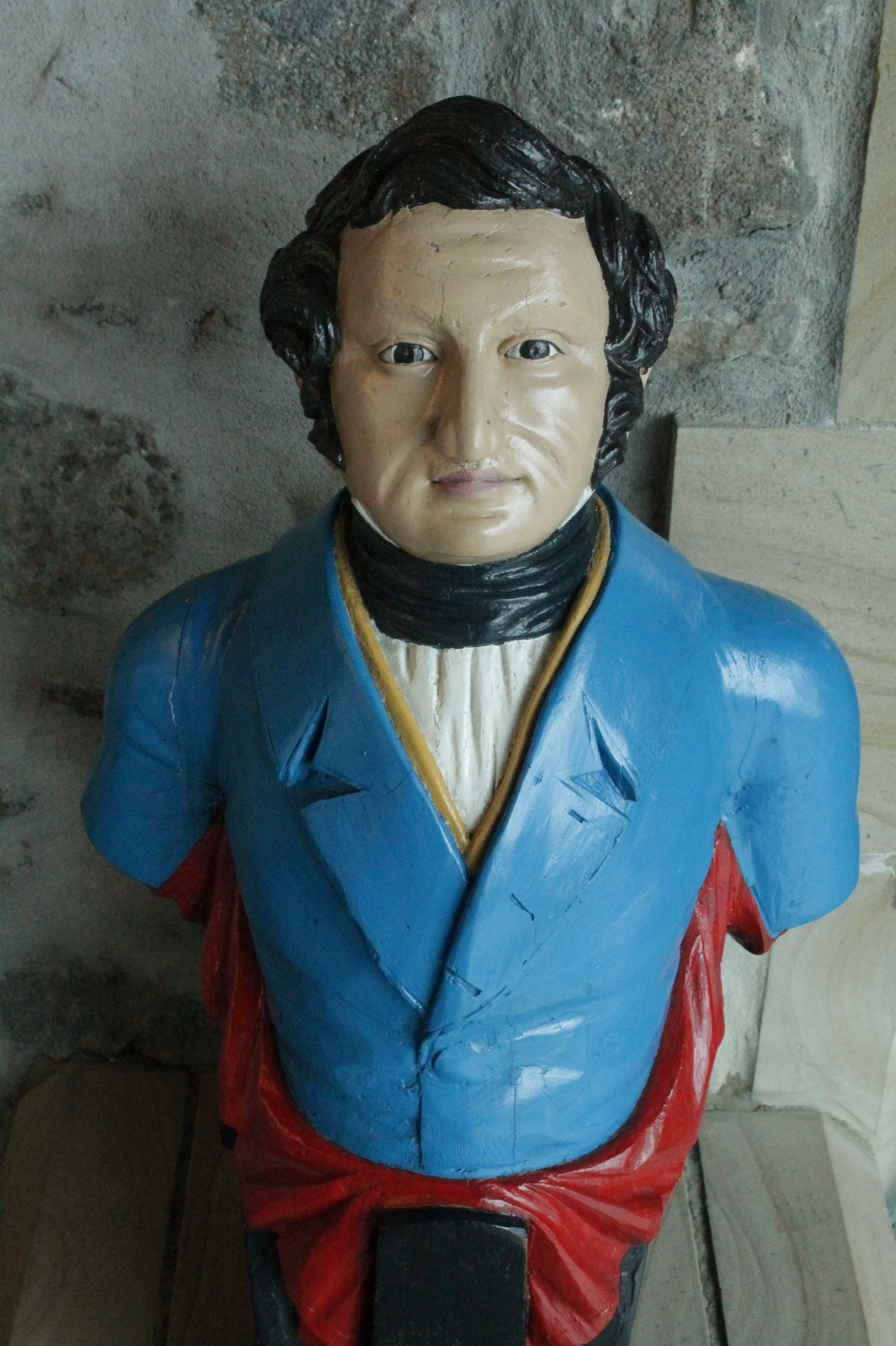
Wooden figure of Thomas Blaikie, Aberdeen Maritime Museum

Sir Thomas Blaikie of Kingseat (11 February 1802 – 25 September 1861) was a Scottish businessman who twice served as Lord Provost of Aberdeen, from 1839 to 1847 and 1853 to 1856.

== Life ==
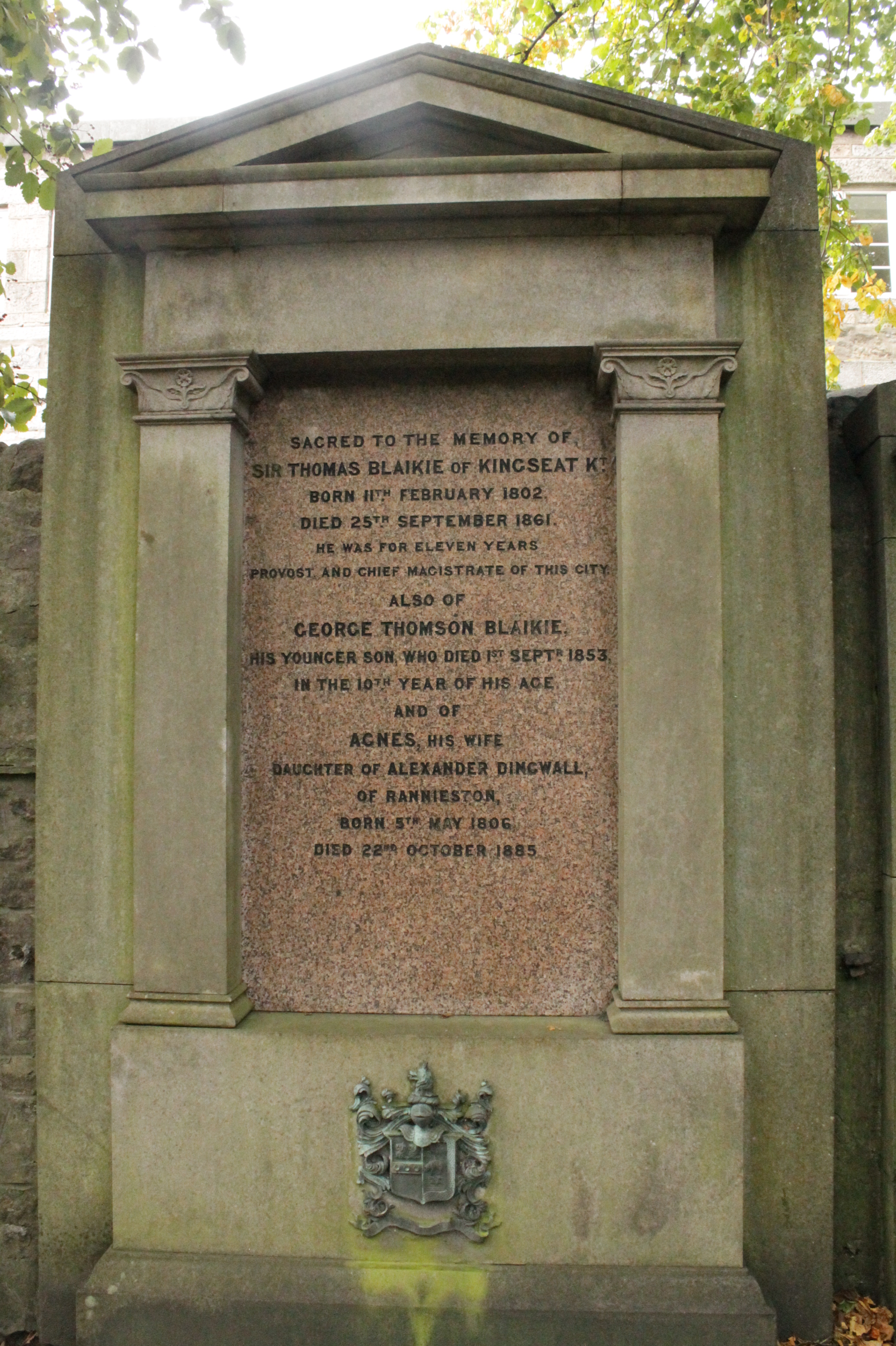
The grave of Sir Thomas Blaikie, graveyard of the Kirk of St Nicholas, Aberdeen

Born in Aberdeen, he was the son of John Blaikie (1756–1826), a plumbing merchant and his wife Helen Richardson (1765–1844). His older brother was James Ogilvie Blaikie (1786–1836). He was educated at Aberdeen Grammar School and then went to Marischal College. On the death of his father he took over his company, J. Blaikie & Co.

Blaikie was elected Lord Provost of Aberdeen five times and served from 1839 until 1847 and again from 1853 until 1856. In the latter year, he was created a Knight Bachelor. In 1855 he was living at 32 Bonaccord Terrace in Aberdeen.

Another point of interest in Sir Thomas' life, was the first conflict of interest case, Aberdeen Railway Co v Blaikie Brothers. Blaikie Brothers were an engineering company specialising in Iron work. A notable piece of work they carried out was the renovation of Crathie Suspension Bridge near Balmoral Castle in 1885. This work was contracted by Queen Victoria.

Thomas died in 1861 and was buried in the churchyard of the Kirk of St Nicholas on Union Street in Aberdeen. The grave lies on the west wall towards the south-west.

== Family ==
On 13 November 1828, he married Agnes Dingwall (1806–1885), the fifth daughter of the Postmaster Alexander Dingwall. The Barque Agnes Blaikie was presumably named in her honour.

They had 10 children; John, Janet, Helen, Agnes Dingwall, Jane, Margaret Jopp, Ann Thomson, Thomas, George Thomson & Emily. Incidentally, Agnes Dingwall Bateson (née Blaikie), was the mother of Sir Alexander Dingwall Bateson, high court judge, and Harold Dingwall Bateson, England Rugby player.

== Recognition ==
The figurehead of Thomas Blaikie in Aberdeen Maritime Museum is thought to be from a ship bearing his name and likely the sister-ship of the more famous ship, the Agnes Blaikie, named after his wife.

== See also ==
- List of Provosts and Lord Provosts of Aberdeen

Civic offices
Preceded by James Milne	Lord Provost of Aberdeen; 1839–1847	Succeeded by George Thompson
Preceded by George Henry	Lord Provost of Aberdeen; 1853–1856	Succeeded by John Webster
