= List of provosts of Aberdeen =

Ceremonial officer in Aberdeen, Scotland

The Lord Provost of Aberdeen is the convener of the Aberdeen City Council in Scotland.

They are elected by the city council and serve not only as the chair of that body, but as a figurehead for the entire city. They are equivalent in many ways to the institution of mayor that exists in many other countries.

According to Munro, the provost of Aberdeen was elected on the first Monday after Michaelmas up to the end of the sixteenth century. From then until 1833, the election took place on the first Wednesday after Michaelmas, and from then (at least until 1897) elections were held on the Friday after the first Tuesday in November. He gives the example of John Cheyne, elected 1593, who would have continued in office until the Michaelmas election of 1594. The dates below, up to 1897, recognise this pattern.

Each of the 32 Scottish local authorities elects a Convener or provost, but only the cities of Edinburgh, Aberdeen, Dundee and Glasgow have a Lord Provost. While this was confirmed in the Local Government (Scotland) Act 1973 and subsequently in the Local Government etc. (Scotland) Act 1994 the title Lord Provost of Aberdeen was formally established in 1863 when Queen Victoria knighted Sir Alexander Anderson designing him 'Lord Provost of Aberdeen'. Until then, while various petitions, and other documents variously addressed the holder as Lord Provost, the title was correctly Provost of Aberdeen.

Since 1899, the Lord Provost of Aberdeen, has also been ex officio the Lord-Lieutenant of the city. Following local government re-organisation brought about by the Local Government etc. (Scotland) Act 1994, this arrangement was confirmed in the Lieutenancies Act 1997.

== 13th century ==
- (1272–1273) Richard Cementarius
- (1273–1274) Mathew Greatheued
- (1281–1282) Mathew Greatheued
- (1284–1285) Malcolm de Pelgoueni

== 14th century ==
- (1309–1310) Duncan de Malauill
- (1321–1322) Duncan Kynnedy
- (1326–1329) Symon Gelchach
- (1329–1332) William Strabrock
- (1332–1333) Symon Gelchach
- (1333–1335) William Strabrock
- (1340–1341) Colin Adamson
- (1341–1342) David Fyngask
- (1343–1344) Thomas Mercer
- (1348–1349) Symon Lynton
- (1349–1351) Robert Edynhame
- (1351–1356) William Leith
- (1361–1363) Thomas Mercer
- (1366–1367) Laurence Garvock
- (1367–1368) Laurence de Foty
- (1372–1374) William Leith
- (1382–1383) Alexander Bannerman
- (1383–1384) John Tulloh
- (1385–1391) Laurence de Foty
- (1391–1395) William de Camera
- (1395–1396) William Andrewson
- (1396–1399) William de Camera
- (1399–1401) Adam de Benyn

== 15th century ==
- (1401–1404) Laurence de Leith
- (1404–1405) William de Camera II
- (1405–1409) Robert Davidson
- (1409–1410) John Fichet
- (1410–1411) Robert Davidson
- (1411–1412) Andrew Giffard
- (1412–1413) Thomas de Camera
- (1413–1415) William Jackson
- (1416–1417) Thomas Roull
- (1419–1420) Thomas Giffard
- (1420–1421) John Vaus
- (1421–1423) William Kintore
- (1423–1424) Gilbert Menzies
- (1424–1425) William Kintore
- (1425–1426) John Vaus
- (1426–1428) Gilbert Menzies
- (1428–1431) John Vaus
- (1431–1435) Thomas de Camera
- (1435–1436) John de Scroggs I
- (1436–1437) John Vaus
- (1437–1438) John de Fyfe
- (1438–1439) Thomas de Camera
- (1439–1440) Gilbert Menzies
- (1440–1441) John de Fyfe
- (1441–1442) Mathew Fichet
- (1442–1443) John Marr
- (1444–1444) Alexander de Camera
- (1444–1446) John Vaus
- (1446–1447) Alexander de Camera
- (1447–1448) William Scherar
- (1448–1449) John de Fyfe
- (1449–1451) John de Scroggs II
- (1451–1453) John de Fyfe
- (1453–1454) John Marr
- (1454–1455) Andrew Menzies
- (1455–1456) John de Scroggs II
- (1456–1458) John de Fyfe
- (1458–1461) Richard Kintore
- (1461–1462) Andrew Menzies
- (1462–1467) Richard Kintore
- (1467–1470) Alexander Chalmers
- (1470–1471) Andrew Alanson
- (1471–1472) Richard Kintore
- (1472–1473) Andrew Scherar
- (1473–1474) Andrew Alanson
- (1474–1475) Alexander Chalmers
- (1475–1476) Alexander Menzies
- (1476–1477) Andrew Scherar
- (1477–1478) Alexander Chalmers
- (1478–1479) Andrew Scherar
- (1479–1480) Alexander Chalmers
- (1480–1481) Alexander Menzies
- (1481–1482) James Leslie
- (1482–1483) Robert Blinseile
- (1483–1484) Sir John Rutherford
- (1484–1485) Alexander Chalmers
- (1485–1486) Sir John Rutherford
- (1486–1487) Alexander Menzies
- (1487–1488) Sir John Rutherford
- (1488–1489) David Menzies
- (1489–1491) Sir John Rutherford
- (1491–1492) John Cullen
- (1492–1493) Sir John Rutherford
- (1493–1494) Alexander Reid
- (1494–1495) David Menzies
- (1495–1496) Alexander Chalmers
- (1496–1501) Sir John Rutherford

== 16th century ==
- (1501–1504) Alexander Menzies
- (1504–1505) John Leslie
- (1505–1506) Gilbert Menzies of Findon
- (1506–1507) Andrew Cullen
- (1507–1514) Gilbert Menzies of Findon
- (1514–1516) John Mar
- (1516–1521) Gilbert Menzies of Findon
- (1521–1522) John Collison
- (1522–1525) Gilbert Menzies of Findon
- (1525–1526) Thomas Menzies of Pitfoddels
- (1526–1533) Gilbert Menzies of Findon
- (1533–1535) Thomas Menzies
- (1535–1536) Andrew Cullen of Pitfoddels
- (1536–1537) Gilbert Menzies of Findon
- (1537–1545) Thomas Menzies of Pitfoddels
- (1545–1547) George Gordon, 4th Earl of Huntly
- (1547–1576) Thomas Menzies of Pitfoddels
- (1576–1588) Gilbert Menzies of Cowlie and Pitfoddles
- (1588–1590) Thomas Menzies of Kirkhill and Durn
- (1590–1591) Alexander Cullen
- (1591–1592) Alexander Rutherford of Rubislaw
- (1592–1593) Sir Thomas Menzies of Durn and Cults
- (1593–1594) John Cheyne
- (1594–1595) John Collison of Auchlunies
- (1595–1596) Sir Thomas Menzies of Durn and Cults
- (1596–1597) Alexander Rutherford
- (1597–1598) Alexander Chalmers
- (1598–1599) Alexander Rutherford
- (1599–1600) Alexander Cullen

== 17th century ==
- (1600–1601) Alexander Rutherford
- (1601–1602) Alexander Cullen
- (1602–1603) Sir Thomas Menzies
- (1603–1604) Alexander Rutherford
- (1604–1605) David Menzies
- (1605–1606) Alexander Rutherford
- (1606–1607) Alexander Cullen
- (1607–1608) Alexander Rutherford
- (1608–1609) Alexander Cullen
- (1609–1610) Alexander Rutherford
- (1610–1611) Alexander Cullen
- (1611–1615) Alexander Rutherford
- (1615–1620) Sir Thomas Menzies
- (1620–1622) David Rutherford
- (1622–1623) George Nicholson
- (1623–1634) Sir Paul Menzies
- (1634–1635) Sir Patrick Leslie
- (1635) Sir Paul Menzies
- (1635) Robert Johnston
- (1635–1637) Alexander Jaffray of Kingswells (b. 1584)
- (1637–1638) Robert Johnston
- (1638–1639) Alexander Jaffray of Kingswells (b. 1584)
- (1639–1641) Sir Patrick Leslie
- (1641–1642) Alexander Jaffray of Kingswells (b. 1584)
- (1642–1644) Sir Patrick Leslie
- (1644–1645) Sir Robert Farquhar
- (1645–1647) Thomas Gray
- (1647–1648) Sir Patrick Leslie
- (1648–1649) Thomas Gray
- (1649–1650) Alexander Jaffray (b. 1614)
- (1650–1651) Sir Robert Farquhar
- (1651–1652) Alexander Jaffray (b.1614)
- (1652–1655) George Morison
- (1655–1656) Thomas Gray
- (1656–1657) George Cullen
- (1657–1660) John Jaffray
- (1660–1662) Gilbert Gray
- (1662–1663) William Gray
- (1663–1664) Gilbert Gray
- (1664–1666) Robert Petrie
- (1666–1667) Gilbert Gray
- (1667–1671) Robert Petrie
- (1671–1674) Robert Forbes
- (1674–1675) Robert Petrie
- (1676–1685) Sir George Skene
- (1685–1688) George Leslie
- (1688–1690) Alexander Gordon
- (1690–1691) John Sandilands
- (1691–1695) Walter Cochran
- (1695–1697) Robert Cruickshank
- (1697) John Johnston
- (1697–1698) Alexander Walker
- (1698–1700) Thomas Mitchell

== 18th century ==
- (1700–1702) John Allardes
- (1702–1704) Thomas Mitchell
- (1704–1705) Alexander Patton
- (1705–1708) John Gordon
- (1708–1710) John Allardes
- (1710–1712) John Ross
- (1712–1714) John Allardes
- (1714–1715) Robert Stewart
- (1715–1716) Patrick Bannerman
- (1716) Robert Stewart
- (1716–1718) John Gordon
- (1718–1720) George Fordyce
- (1720–1722) Robert Stewart
- (1722–1724) George Fordyce
- (1724–1726) Robert Stewart
- (1726–1728) George Fordyce
- (1728–1730) William Cruickshank
- (1730–1732) James Morison Snr
- (1732–1734) William Cruickshank
- (1734–1736) Hugh Hay
- (1736–1738) John Robertson of Pitmillan
- (1738–1740) William Chalmers
- (1740–1742) Alexander Robertson of Glasgowego
- (1742–1744) Alexander Aberdein
- (1744–1746) James Morison Jnr
- (1746–1748) William Chalmers
- (1748–1750) Alexander Robertson of Glasgowego
- (1750–1752) Alexander Livingstone
- (1752–1754) James Morison Jnr
- (1754–1756) William Mowat
- (1756–1758) Alexander Robertson of Glasgowego
- (1758–1760) John Duncan
- (1760–1762) William Davidson
- (1762–1764) John Duncan
- (1764–1766) George Shand
- (1766–1768) John Duncan
- (1768–1770) James Jopp
- (1770–1772) George Shand
- (1772–1774) James Jopp
- (1774–1776) Adam Duff
- (1776–1778) James Jopp
- (1778–1780) William Young
- (1780–1782) James Jopp
- (1782–1784) William Young
- (1784–1786) William Cruden
- (1786–1787) James Jopp
- (1787–1789) John Abercrombie
- (1789–1791) William Cruden
- (1791–1793) George Auldjo
- (1793–1795) John Abercrombie Jnr
- (1795–1797) George More
- (1797–1799) Thomas Leys
- (1799–1801) John Dingwall

== 19th century ==
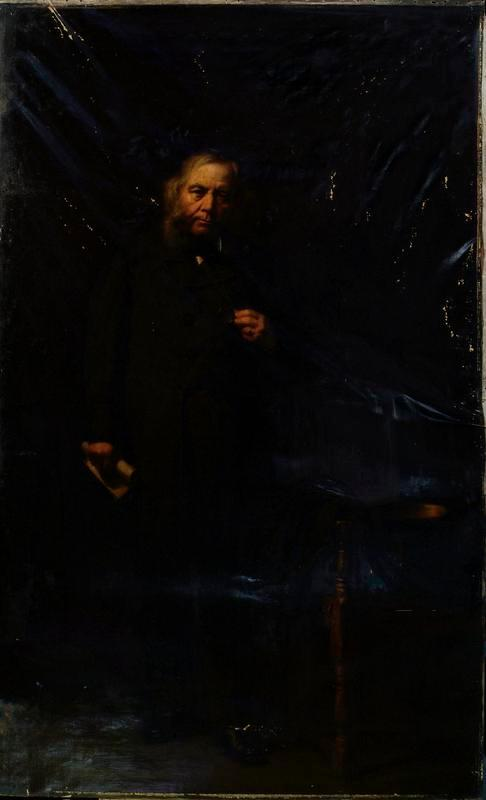
Portrait of Sir Alexander Anderson of Blelack, Lord Provost (1859-1865), by Sir George Reid

- (1801–1803) James Hadden
- (1803–1805) Thomas Leys
- (1805–1807) Alexander Brebner
- (1807–1809) George More
- (1809–1811) James Hadden
- (1811–1813) James Young
- (1813–1815) James Hadden
- (1815–1817) Alexander Fraser
- (1817–1818) Charles Forbes (elected 24 Sept 1817, removed from office by decree of Court of Session 10 March 1818)
- (1818–1820) Alexander Brebner (elected 23 September 1818)
- (1820–1822) Gavin Hadden
- (1822–1824) Alexander Brown
- (1824–1826) Gavin Hadden
- (1826–1828) Alexander Brown
- (1828–1830) Gavin Hadden
- (1830–1832) James Hadden
- (1832–1833) Gavin Hadden
- (1833–1836) James Blaikie
- (1836–1839) James Milne
- (1839–1847) Sir Thomas Blaikie
- (1847–1850) George Thompson Jnr
- (1850–1853) George Henry
- (1853–1856) Sir Thomas Blaikie
- (1856–1859) John Webster
- (1859–1865) Sir Alexander Anderson First Lord Provost of Aberdeen
- (1865–1869) Alexander Nicol
- (1869–1874) William Leslie of Nethermuir
- (1874–1880) George Jamieson (Liberal)
- (1880–1883) Peter Esslemont (Liberal)
- (1883–1886) James Matthews
- (1886–1889) William Henderson (Liberal)
- (1889–1895) David Stewart (Conservative)
- (1895–1898) Daniel Mearns
- (1898–1902) John Fleming (Liberal) First Lord-Lieutenant of Aberdeen
Portraits of 19th century Provosts of Aberdeen in Aberdeen Archives, Gallery & Museums Collections

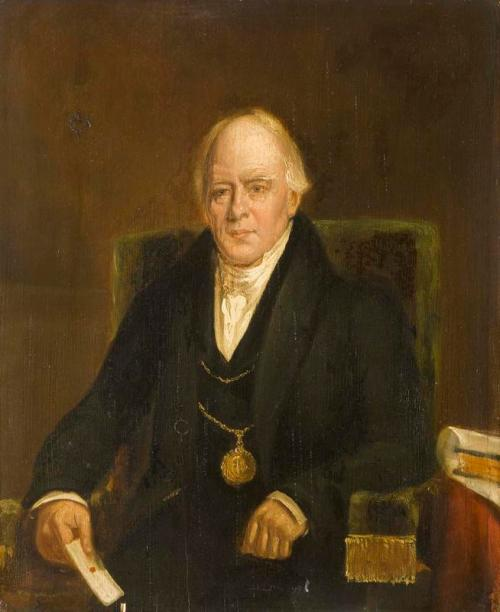
James Hadden of Persley, Provost of Aberdeen (1801-3, 1809-11, 1813-15, 1830-32)

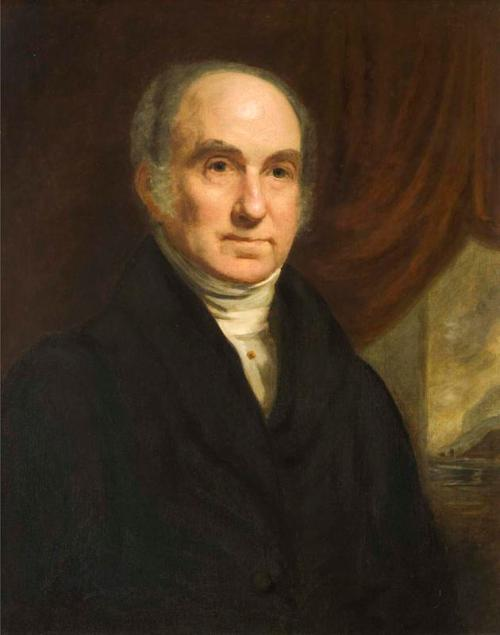
Sir Charles Forbes (1817-1818) by Colvin Smith

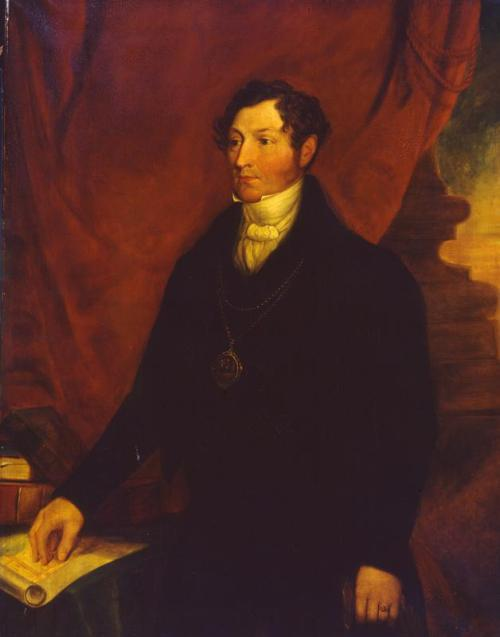
Sir Thomas Blaikie, Provost of Aberdeen 1839-47, 1853-56 by John Phillip

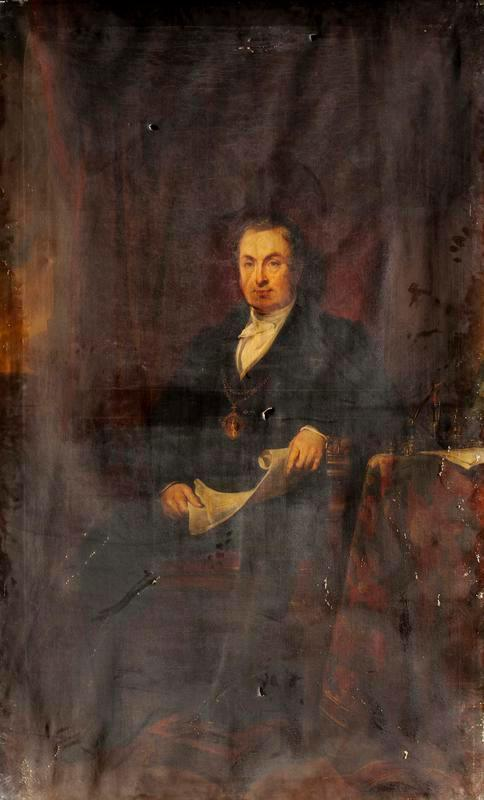
James Blaikie of Craigiebuckler, Provost of Aberdeen (1833-1835)

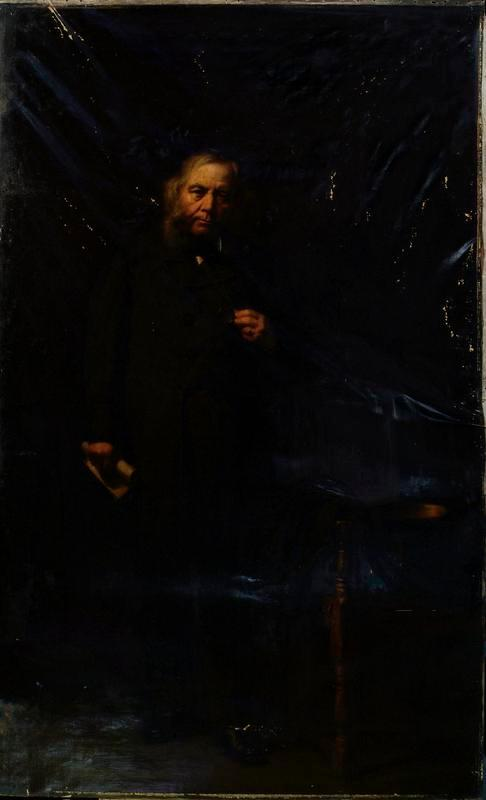
Sir Alexander Anderson of Brelack, Provost of Aberdeen (1859-1865) by Sir George Reid

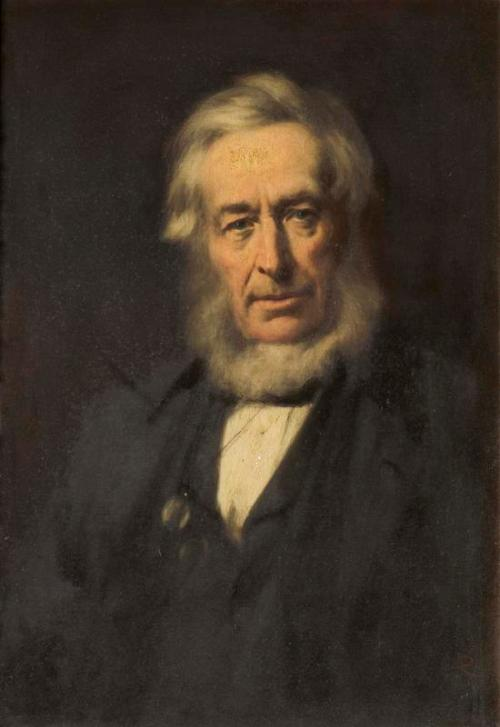
William Leslie of Nethermuir, Lord Provost of Aberdeen (1869-73) by Sir George Reid

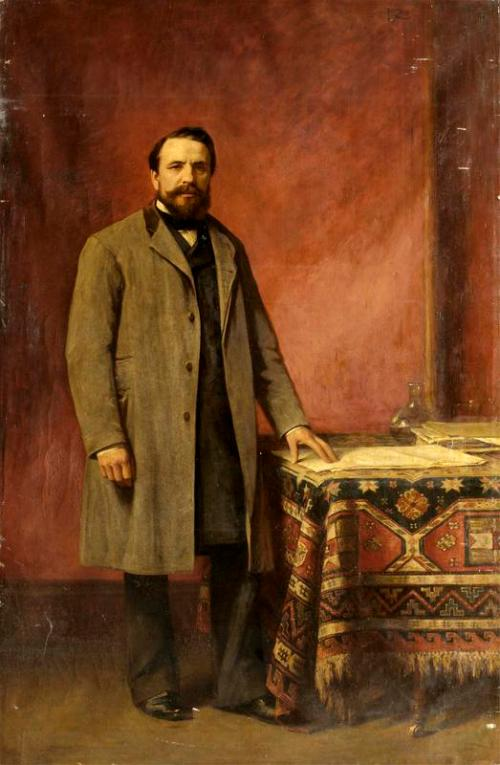
Lord Provost Peter Esslemont (1834-1894) by Sir George Reid

== 20th century ==
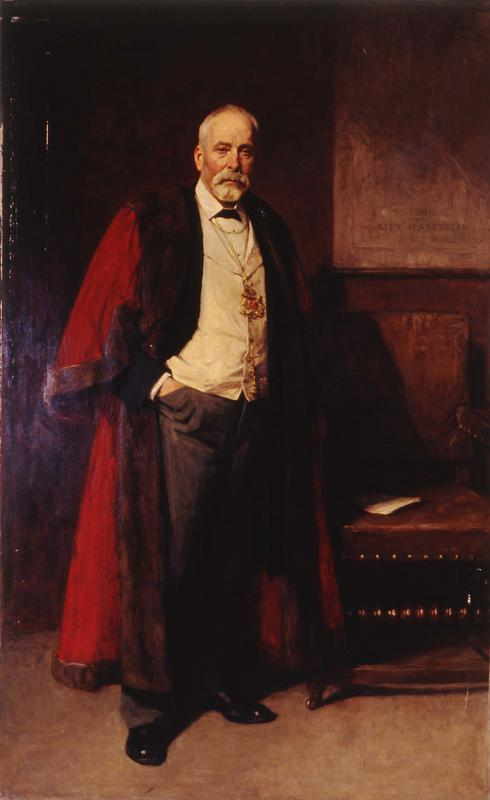
James Walker, by Sir George Reid

- (1902–1905) James Walker of Richmondhill
- (1905–1908) Sir Alexander Lyon
- (1908–1911) Alexander Wilson
- (1911–1914) Adam Maitland
- (1914–1919) Sir James Taggart
- (1919–1925) Sir William Meff
- (1925–1929) Sir Andrew Jopp Williams Lewis
- (1929–1932) James Reid Rust
- (1932–1935) Sir Henry Alexander
- (1935–1936) Edward William Watt
- (1936–1947) Sir Thomas Mitchell
- (1947–1951) Duncan Fraser (Labour)
- (1951–1952) William Reid
- (1952–1955) Reverend Professor John Graham (Labour)
- (1955–1961) George Stephen (Labour)
- (1961–1964) Reverend Professor John Graham (Labour)
- (1964–1967) Norman Hogg (Labour)
- (1967–1970) Robert Lennox (Labour)
- (1970–1971) James Lamond (Labour)
- (1971–1975) John Farquharson Smith (Labour)
- (1975–1977) Robert Lennox (Labour)
- (1977–1980) William James Fraser (Labour)
- (1980–1984) Alexander C Collie (Labour)
- (1984–1988) Henry Rae (Labour)
- (1988–1992) Robert Robertson (Labour)
- (1992–1996) James Wyness (Labour)
- (1996–1999) Margaret Farquhar (Labour) First female Lord Provost of Aberdeen
- (1999–2003) Margaret Elizabeth Smith (Labour)
Images of 20th century Lord Provosts in Aberdeen Archives Gallery & Museums Collections

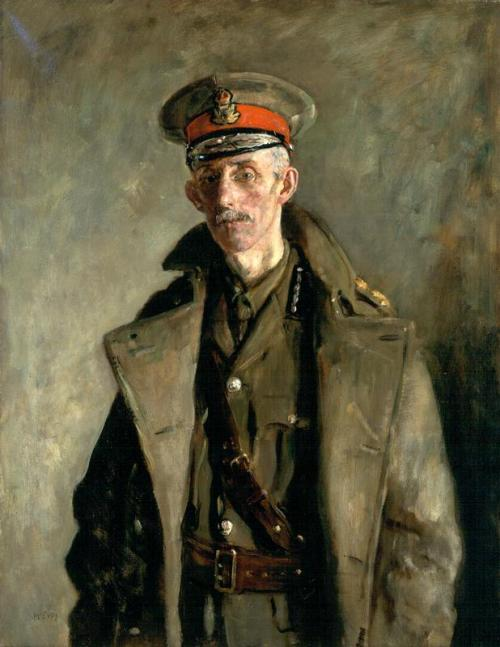
Sir James Taggart, KBE, Lord Provost of Aberdeen (1914-1919) by Ambrose McEvoy

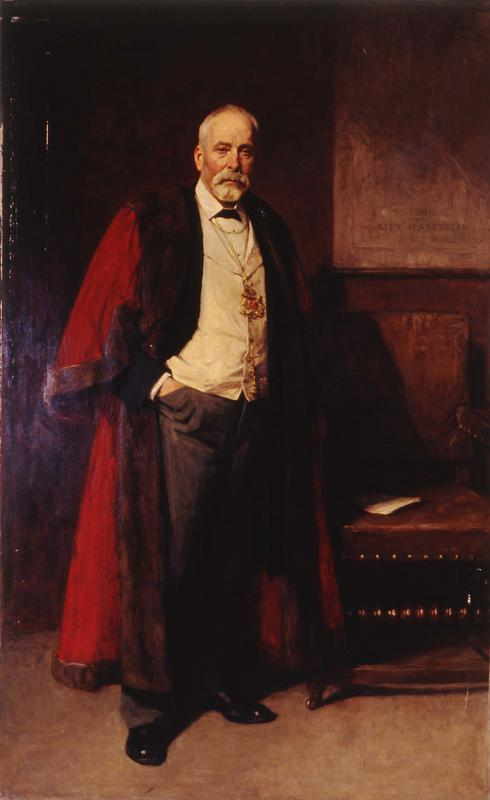
James Walker of Richmondhill, Lord Provost of Aberdeen (1902-1905) by Sir George Reid

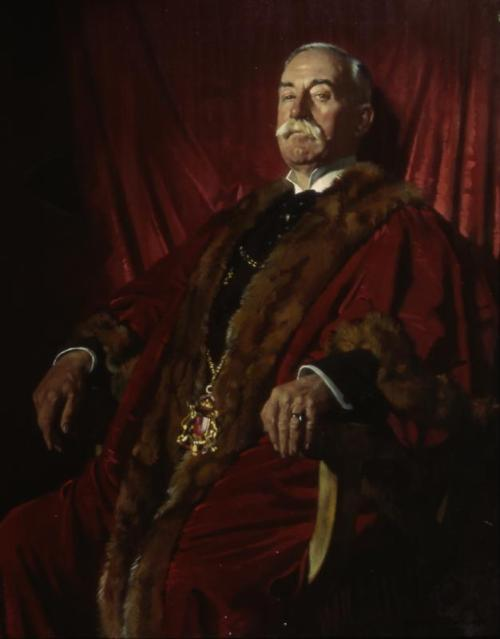
Sir William Meff, Lord Provost of Aberdeen (1919-1925)

== 21st century ==
- (2003–2007) John Michael Reynolds (Liberal Democrats)
- (2007–2012) Peter James Stephen (Liberal Democrats)
- (2012–2017) George Adam (Labour)
- (2017–2022) James 'Barney' Crockett (Labour)
- (2022–present) Dr David Cameron (Scottish National Party) - First SNP Lord Provost of Aberdeen
