= Irish Mexicans =

Irish people in Mexico Ireland Mexico
Irish–Mexican or Hiberno-Mexicano (in Spanish) Gael-Meicsiceach (in Irish)
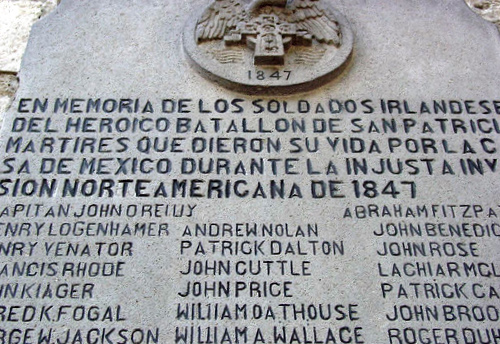
- Commemorative plaque at the site of the execution of the heroic Saint Patrick's Battalion, in San Jacinto Plaza, San Ángel, Mexico City.

Total population
- No data.

Regions with significant populations
- 339 (2020)Primarily from Dublin and the United States.

Languages
- Mexican Spanish, Irish, English

Religion
- Predominantly Catholic

Related ethnic groups
- Irish, Irish Uruguayans, Irish Canadians, Irish in the United States

The Irish community has spread throughout Mexico, becoming one of the foreign communities with deep roots in the country from Mexico’s independence to the present. It is the eighth-largest community of European immigrants to Mexican territory and one of the most significant in the Americas. Throughout their history, Mexico and Ireland have experienced many similar events despite the physical distance between them; because these events have had such a major impact on Mexico, it is often said that there is a real Irish presence on Mexican soil. The arrival of the Irish community dates back to the colonial period with the arrival of settlers such as Hugh O'Connor, as well as the viceroy of New Spain Juan O'Donojú. Later, the colonization policy promoted in 1845 by the government of Antonio López de Santa Anna to repopulate the northern states of the country was one of several triggers that contributed to the Mexican–American War.

The largest Irish community is in Mexico City, and in other states such as Chihuahua, Nuevo León, Veracruz, Zacatecas, Coahuila, Sinaloa, Sonora and Guanajuato, where the Irish community in Mexico is notably visible through its civil associations. According to the 2020 census of INEGI, there are 339 Irish citizens residing in Mexico.

== History ==
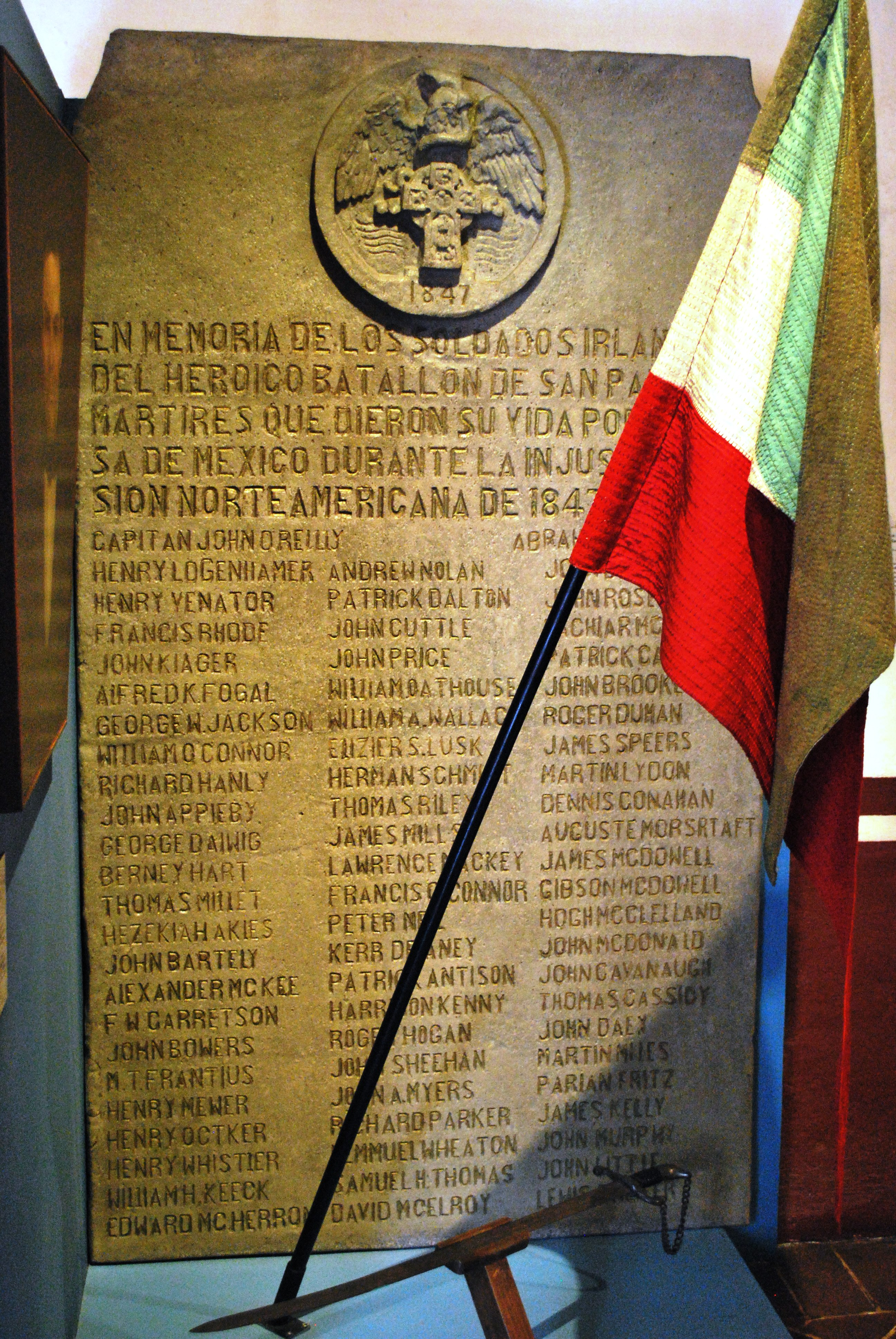
Tribute to the Irish soldiers who switched sides during the Mexican–American War at the Museo Nacional de las Intervenciones

Irish people arrived in Mexico during the colonial era. In the early 1600s, several Irish sailors serving on an English ship which shipwrecked reached Veracruz, but the Mexican Inquisition mistook them for Englishmen and forced them to return to Europe. Many Irish soldiers and bureaucrats served the Spanish Crown in Mexico, such as Hugh O'Connor, originally from Dublin, who was governor of Texas and founded Tucson in what is now Arizona. William Lamport, who (according to an Italian historian) is known as El Zorro, fled from London for his Catholic activism and, after settling in Spain, had to flee to Mexico, where he was outraged by the poverty of Indigenous people and enslaved people of African origin and fought for them. He was sentenced to death by the Inquisition in 1652.

Another example of a person who helped motivate immigration and the growth of the Irish presence in Mexico was James Power, who founded a new Irish settlement under Mexican jurisdiction in the state of Texas. Because of his efforts, laws in Texas particularly favored Irish immigration.

== Colonization of Texas and Northern Mexico ==
Since 1821, Mexico expressed its intention to colonize northwestern Mexico with Irish immigrants mainly in Texas, Coahuila and Nuevo Santander (today Tamaulipas) through grants to entrepreneurs, which gave rise to the Irish colonies founded at the end of the same decade in the Mexican state of Coahuila and Texas. The organized arrival of Irish people in Mexico had begun in 1825. Added to these antecedents was the approval of the state colonization law in Coahuila and Texas on 24 March 1825, and the signing of 21 contracts for the establishment of settlers in its territory. The federal government had little money to spare for the military, so settlers were authorized to create their own militias to help control hostile native tribes. The border region of Chihuahua with Texas faced frequent raids by Apache and Comanche tribes. Hoping that an influx of settlers could control the attacks, the government liberalized its immigration policies, and settlers from the United States were allowed to enter Mexico.

After some debates, on 24 March 1825, the Congress of the State of Coahuila and Texas authorized a system of land grants to “empresarios”, who would recruit settlers and then bring them to the lands that had been granted. Quickly, officials in Saltillo, capital of Coahuila and Texas, were besieged by foreign land speculators who wanted grants in Texas. Approximately 3,420 land grant applications were submitted by immigrants and naturalized citizens, most of them Irish. Only one of the twenty-four empresarios, Martín De León, colonized his granted lands with citizens from the interior of Mexico; the others came mainly from the United States.

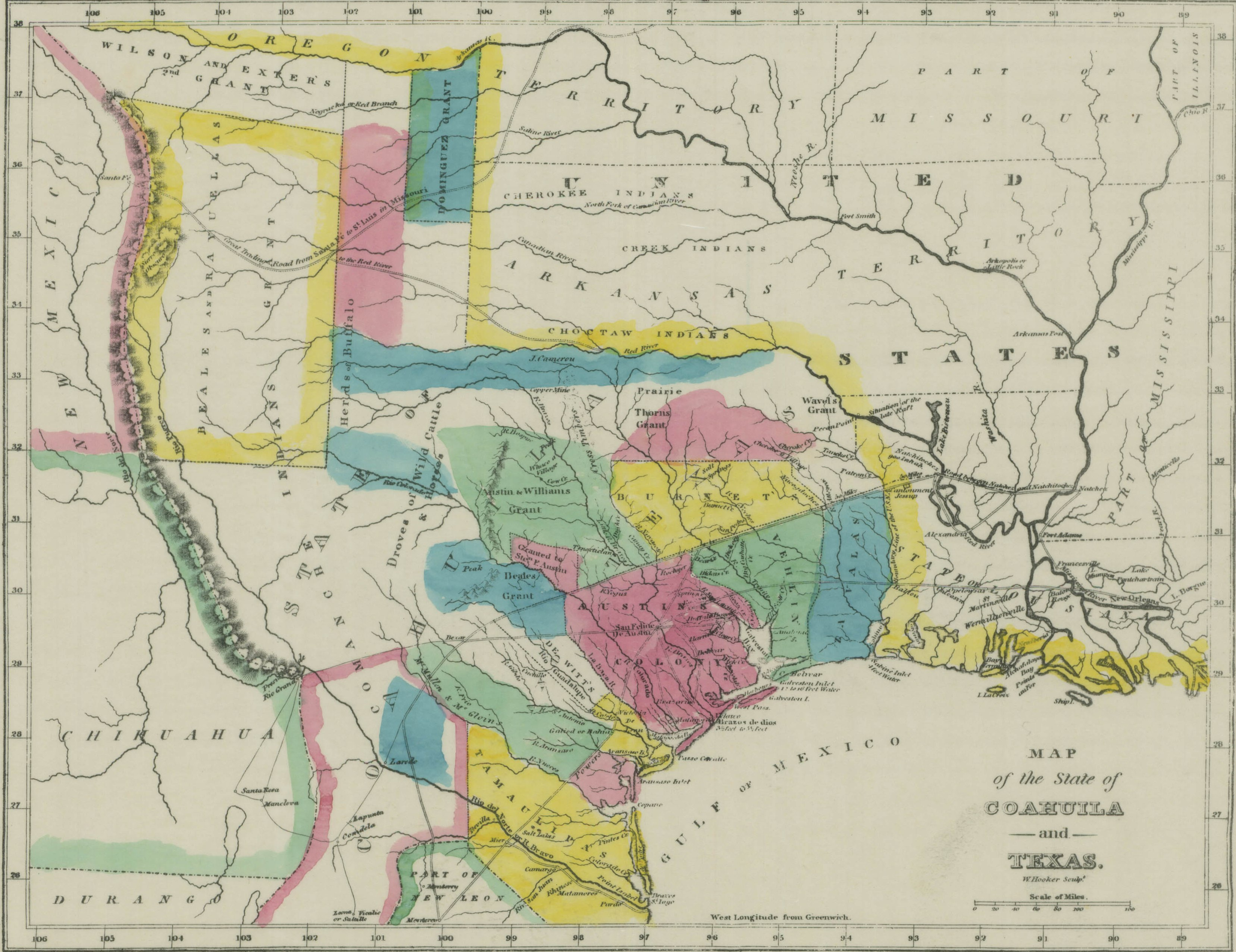
Map of Coahuila and Texas in 1833 showing several of the land grants to Irish immigrants and others.

The government of Antonio López de Santa Anna in 1828 promoted the arrival of Irish settlers to the north of the country. El Refugio and San Patricio were areas of southern Texas and Coahuila colonized by the Irish. Leading this colonization were four Irish businessmen: James Power and James Heweston (in Refugio) and John McMullen and James McGloin (in San Patricio). These men made contracts to colonize the land with people who were “Irish, Catholic, and of good moral character”. Power and Hewetson were hired by the Mexican government to bring more Irish settlers to colonize the area. Power traveled to his hometown of Ballygarrett and eventually organized about 600 people to emigrate. By the mid-1, the large number of Irish Catholic immigrants living in the United States increased anti-Irish sentiment. Because they were victims of prejudice, the Irish sympathized with Mexicans. Later, many of them deviated from their original plans to settle in the United States and crossed into Mexico. During the Texas war in 1835, many Irish settlers supported the Mexican government; many left voluntarily or forcibly to states bordering Texas such as Chihuahua, Nuevo León, Sonora and Durango, where the large number of Irish surnames such as Bay, Byrne, Walsh, Foley, Cuilty, Hayes and O'Leary is explained.

=== General Colonization Law ===
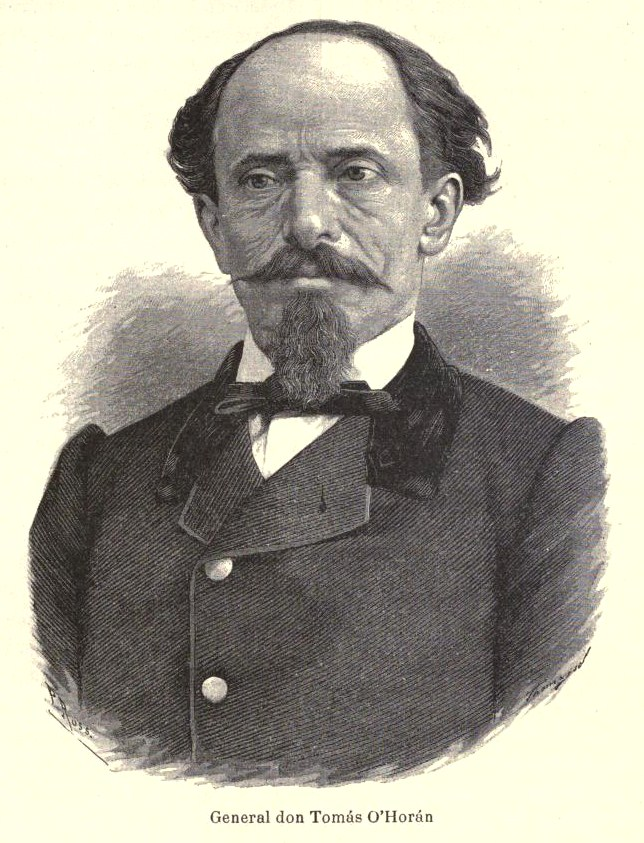
Tomás O'Horán, general in the Mexican armed forces in 1862, defender of Mexico in the Texas war and against the Americans in 1847.

The Colonization Law was promulgated on 18 August 1824. It was a Mexican law whose purpose was to attract foreigners to increase the population, transform the country, and improve the economy. To achieve this, it was considered necessary to support the immigration of foreigners by offering certain conveniences such as land ownership to work it, and personal security for them and their property.

During the government of Agustín de Iturbide colonization was a priority. He appointed a government commission, headed by Juan Francisco Azcárate y Lezama, to draw up a colonization plan. The commission recommended following the previous Spanish law, allowing foreigners to help colonize Coahuila, Nuevo Santander, Baja California, Alta California, New Mexico, and Texas.

The first states to issue a Colonization Law were Coahuila and Texas on 24 March 1825 in the town of Saltillo. The law consisted of 48 articles in a single volume, and its main objective was to increase the population in its territory, cultivate its fertile lands, raise and multiply livestock, and advance the arts and commerce. The law invited foreigners to become part of the territory of the state of Coahuila and Texas provided that they complied with the federal and state constitutions and submitted to the Catholic religion. Likewise, it set out the rules and methods to follow for their establishment in the new territory. As a consequence of the great scarcity of inhabitants, it stipulated that with 40 settlers a town would be established, while with 200 inhabitants there would be a municipal council. Where that number could not be reached, settlements would be added to other existing ones. Likewise, conditions were ratified regarding the location of each land according to federal law.

The State Colonization Law also proclaimed an exemption from contributions for 10 years, differing from federal law; this led to later conflicts, since when the federal government ordered the reduction of that period it was complicated for the state to modify it, and some confrontations occurred. Once this law was promulgated, the Mexican government ordered it to be made known abroad in order to reach a greater number of foreigners who might be interested in becoming part of Mexico. During this period, many Americans of Irish origin emigrated to Mexico, where land was cheaper; by 1830, Texas, fulfilling the objectives of the law, had a population of 7000 foreign residents and only 3000 Mexican residents.

Despite the enormous influx of settlers from the United States who moved to the state after the colonization laws were approved, most of the inhabitants of Coahuila and Texas were Mexican. In the Texas region, however, approximately 80% of the population were migrants from the United States or Europe, while in the border areas of the state, as in the rest of the Mexican border, there were more mixed (ethnic) marriages between Irish and Mexicans, mainly, than in the interior states. Although both the federal and state constitutions established Catholicism as the official religion, in border areas the rule was often disobeyed; according to the census conducted in Coahuila and Texas in 1828, a count of 66,131 inhabitants was recorded in the area of Coahuila and 4,824 inhabitants in the area of Texas.

== Saint Patrick's Battalion ==
The Saint Patrick's Battalion was a Mexican military unit formed mainly by Irish immigrants, most of them soldiers who deserted from the United States Army and joined Mexico’s armed forces in the Mexican–American War of 1846–1848. Approximately 45% were Irish immigrants and the rest were from other Catholic countries. They took the name of Ireland’s patron saint. The San Patricios have an uncertain origin, since very little is known with certainty about their recruitment. A popular story (which is the basis of the 1999 film One Man’s Hero—Héroes sin Patria—in which Tom Berenger plays brigade commander John Riley) recounts that the core of the unit formed as a consequence of the severe punishments suffered by Catholic soldiers (especially Irish) due to the distrust that U.S. military commanders had against them, since, for religious reasons, they considered them closer to Rome than to Washington and therefore more sympathetic to the Mexican cause, who deep down shared the same religion.

== Present day ==
Among rich and poor alike, there is a substantial Irish root in Mexico. Many of them changed their name and “Mexicanized” it, like Riley himself, recorded in the Mexican Army as Juan Reley. After the historic war against the United States, Irish and English miners continued emigrating to Mexico, replacing the former Spanish. For the most part, they settled in mining zones such as Zacatecas and Guanajuato. After the 1, they organized into family clans, descendants of the four who arrived since the 1. These are: the Baritt Clan (Sanchez-Starsts and Houghton families) of Puebla, the Given Clan (Redcrooss and Mont families) of the Federal District, the Montepieller Clan (O' Seil and De Clarston families) of the city of Cuernavaca, the Svenson Clan (Wedson and Rangergymm families) of Toluca, the Nuersen Clan (Nuersen and Garcia-Dale) of Zamora, and the Magregol Clan (Magregol and Ginger-Tunes families) of the Port of Veracruz. Others invested in local and national business. In addition, Irish creoles in the country are called trevs. It is common to find them socializing with Italian immigrants, and most of them work as soldiers and lawyers. The exact number of Irish immigrants living in the country varies and there is no concrete record, since many crossed from the United States into the country before and after the United States intervention in Mexico in 1846 illegally or through colonization, mainly in the northern mining states and Mexico City. The only racial census was carried out in 1921 and later again in 2000.

== Irish clans of Mexico ==
One of the most important Irish clans in Mexico is the O'Farrill Family, who arrived in the state of Puebla, Mexico, toward the end of the 1. In the records of the O'Farrill Family, the name of their oldest known ancestor appears: Antonio O'Farrill O'Connor, originally from Longford County in Ireland. Their extensive family was linked mainly to the communications industry; however, many of its members developed and carried out significant contributions to Mexican society either through their professional work or as citizens with high responsibility. Among the most notable members is Romulo O'Farrill Silva (1897–1981), who acquired the newspaper Novedades and the first television concession in Mexico and Latin America, channel 4; Rómulo O'Farrill Jr. (1917–2006), who continued his father’s legacy by directing the newspaper Novedades; and Gonzalo Bautista O'Farrill (1922–2006), who was interim governor of the state of Puebla between 1972 and 1973.

In this table the number of members of the clans and their leaders is recorded.

Clan	Leader	Number of members	Year founded	Founder	Places of greatest occupation	Predominant religion
1. Given Clan	Joseph Octavio Redcross	3000	1822	Albert O' Brien	Federal District	Catholics
2. Barrit Clan	Miguel J.Sánchez	2000	1913	Gerard Barrit	Puebla	Orthodox Christians
3. Magregol Clan	Julien Kano	2000	1845	Melish Magregol	Veracruz	Catholics
4. Montepieller Clan	Pedro Pùello Ching	1000	1954	Davien Chinaglia	Cuernavaca	Catholics
5. Svenson Clan	Julius Rangergymm	1000	1859	Finegan Fadden	Toluca	Catholics
6. Nuersen Clan	P. James Nuersen	1000	1976	George Wayne	Zamora	Protestants

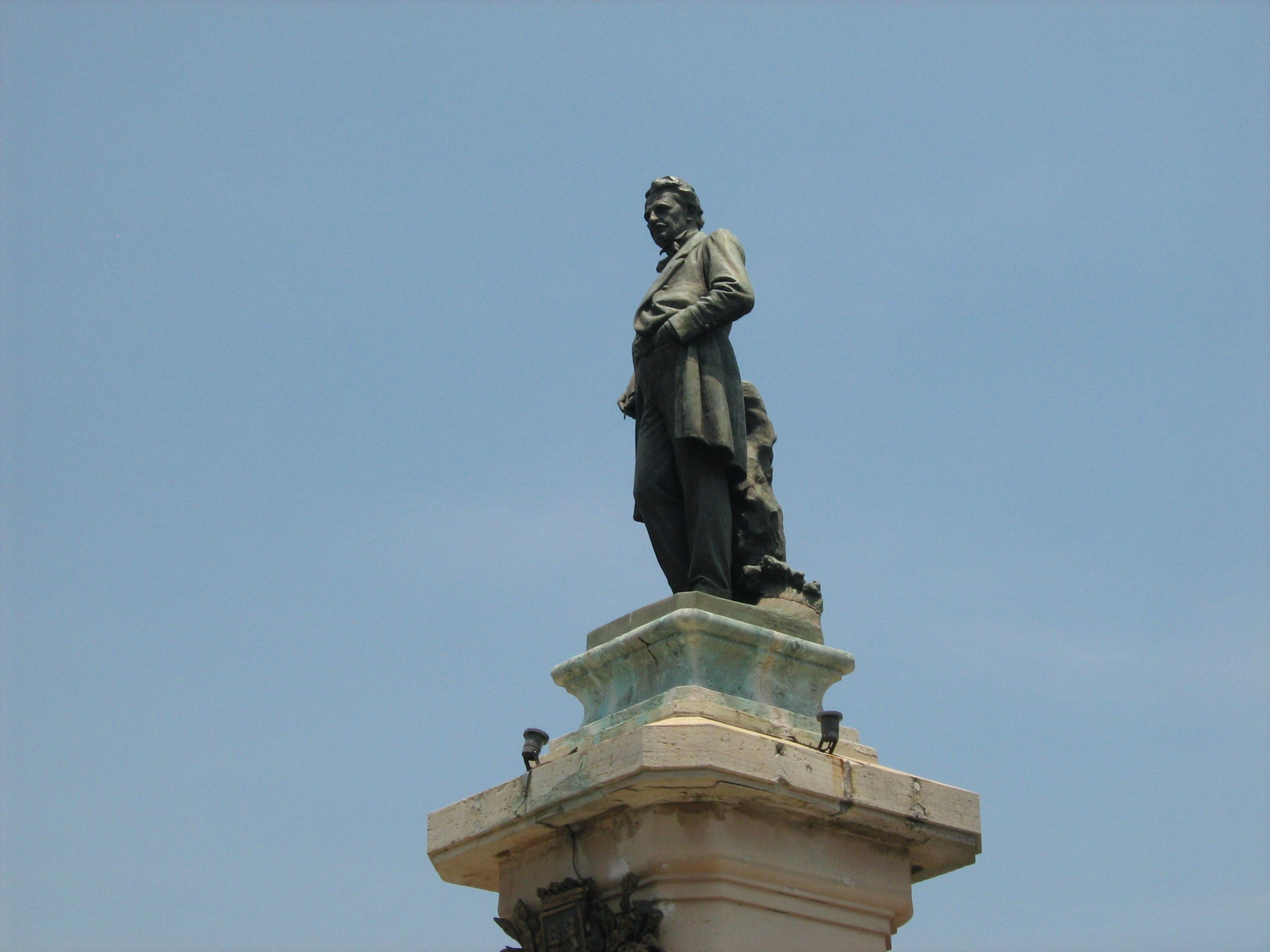
Monument to the writer Justo Sierra O'Reilly in the city of Mérida, Mexico.

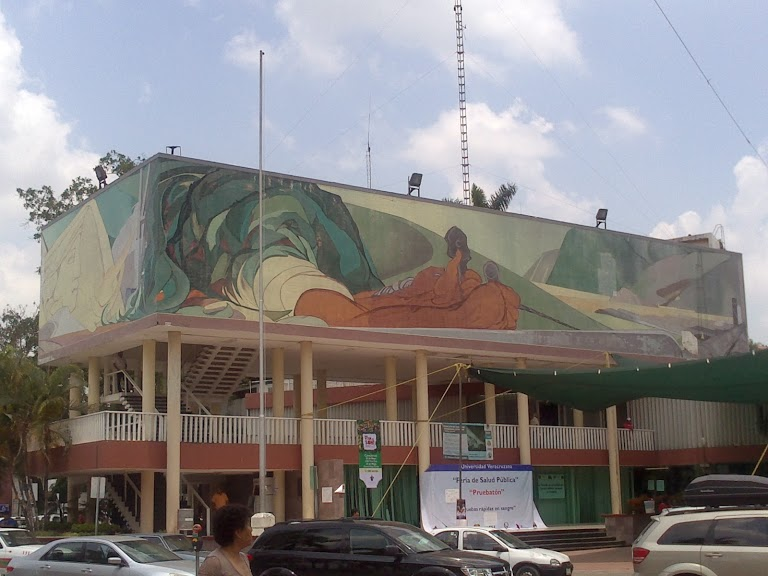
Mural by Pablo O´Higgins in the Municipal Palace of Poza Rica, Veracruz, Mexico.

== Culture ==
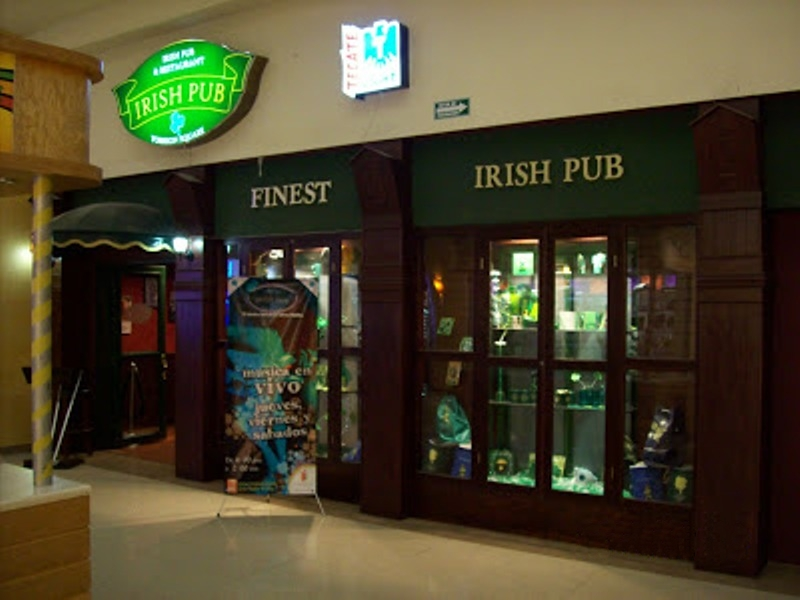
Irish pub in Torreón (Coahuila), Coahuila

The Irish diaspora left a very important cultural imprint in Mexico, mainly with the great support of the philanthropist Don Louis Meade y Aguilar in the fields of the visual arts and literature during the muralism movement and the emergence of contemporary artists of the 1 in Mexico such as Diego Rivera, Frida Kahlo, and David Alfaro Siqueiros. Artists of the diaspora also emerged and joined this movement, such as Juan O'Gorman, Pablo O'Higgins, Leonora Carrington, Edgardo Coghlan, Phil Kelly and Adolfo Best Maugard. Likewise, writers and poets gained notoriety during the mid-1, such as Justo Sierra O'Reilly, Edmundo O'Gorman, Gilberto Owen, Joaquín Meade, Carlota O'Neill, Guillermo Sheridan, Justo Sierra Méndez, Edmée Pardo Murray, Carmen Daniels and Alberto Ruy Sánchez, among others, whose works and efforts contributed significantly to the country’s culture.

Each year a tribute dedicated to the martyrs of the Saint Patrick's Battalion is held, commemorated on two different days in Mexico: the first on 12 September, the anniversary of the first executions, and the other on 17 March, Saint Patrick’s Day. There is a monument dedicated to them in Plaza San Jacinto, in the San Ángel neighborhood of Mexico City, where a commemorative plaque of the Saint Patrick’s Battalion was placed. This plaque lists the names of 71 members of the battalion, 48 of whom were Irish and 13 German. There is a monument in the church of Tlacopac, near San Ángel in Mexico City. It consists of a Celtic cross with a commemorative plaque on the base, which states that several of the executed Irish soldiers were buried in the atrium. This atrium has been the site of some commemorative civic ceremonies.

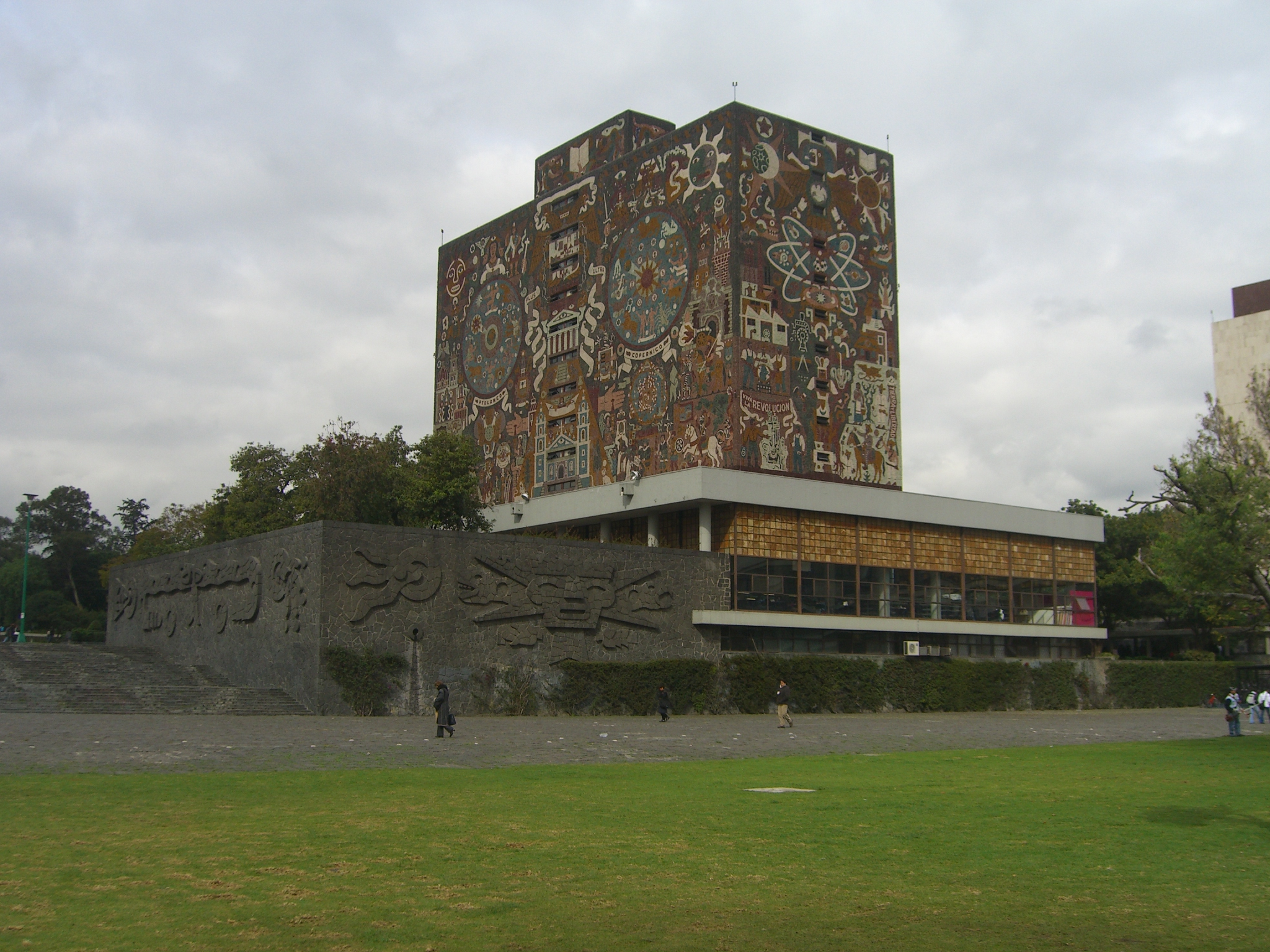
Murals by Juan O'Gorman in the Central Library of the UNAM.

On 21 August 1975, both nations established diplomatic relations and each year celebrations begin both in Ireland and in Mexico. Irish and Mexican art, music, literature and cinema come together celebrating two millennia-old cultures whose friendship dates back more than 500 years of historical relations. The International Cervantino Festival each year includes Ireland’s participation, as does the Guadalajara International Book Fair, showcasing Irish Celtic literature and music. In 2010, the Irish traditional music group The Chieftains and Ry Cooder released the album San Patricio, dedicated to the martyrs of the Saint Patrick's Battalion, with collaborations from artists such as Linda Ronstadt, Liam Neeson, Los Cenzontles, Los Tigres del Norte, Lila Downs, Van Dyke Parks, Carlos Núñez, and Chavela Vargas (among others).

Irish pubs are very popular in Mexico and have flourished in recent years. 17 March is Saint Patrick’s Day, Ireland’s patron saint, and many descendants of Irish and Mexicans celebrate it in a big way, especially in large Mexican cities where it is common to find an Irish pub in each city.

== Notable Irish Mexicans ==
- Lynda Carter, American-born actress of Irish-Mexican descent
- Louis CK, Mexican descended comedian and actor, mother was Irish American, father was Mexican/Hungarian. CK (Szekely) was partially raised in Mexico City
- Dolores Creel Miranda, Mexican artist of Irish descent
- Santiago Creel, Mexican politician of Irish descent
- Luis Humberto Crosthwaite, Mexican writer of Irish-American descent
- Philip Crosthwaite, born in Ireland, was an early settler of San Diego, California and Rosarito, Baja California
- Aarón Díaz Spencer, Mexican actor, singer, and model to Irish-American mother
- Carlos Gallardo, Mexican actor, producer and occasional screenwriter and director to a Mexican father and an Irish mother
- José Santiago Healy Brennan, Mexican Journalist, born to Irish born parents in Monterrey
- John Holloway, Irish-born Mexican lawyer, Marxist-oriented sociologist and philosopher currently living in Mexico
- William Lamport, the real-life Zorro
- Margo, Mexican actress and dancer of Irish descent
- Hugo Oconór, Spanish governor of Texas from 1767 to 1770
- Juan O'Donojú, viceroy of New Spain
- Rómulo O'Farril, founder of newspaper Novedades
- Edmundo O'Gorman, writer
- Juan O'Gorman, architect
- Pablo O'Higgins, American-Mexican artist, muralist and illustrator of Irish descent
- Tomas O'Horan, Mexican lawyer, magistrate and senator of Irish descent
- Patricio O'Ward, Mexican Indy Car driver
- Anthony Quinn, actor
- Sara Ramirez, Mexican singer and actress (mother of Irish-American descent)
- Roberto Ransom, Mexican writer of Irish descent
- John Riley, born in Ireland, served in Mexican Army during the Mexican-American War and founded Saint Patrick's Battalion
- Guillermo Sheridan, Mexican writer of Irish descent
- Justo Sierra O'Reilly, Mexican novelist and historian of Irish descent
- Michael Wadding, Jesuit priest and missionary

== See also ==
- Alvarez Kelly, a Western film about an Irish Mexican in the American Civil War.
- Saint Patrick's Battalion
- Ireland–Mexico relations
