= O'Gorman Columbian manuscript =

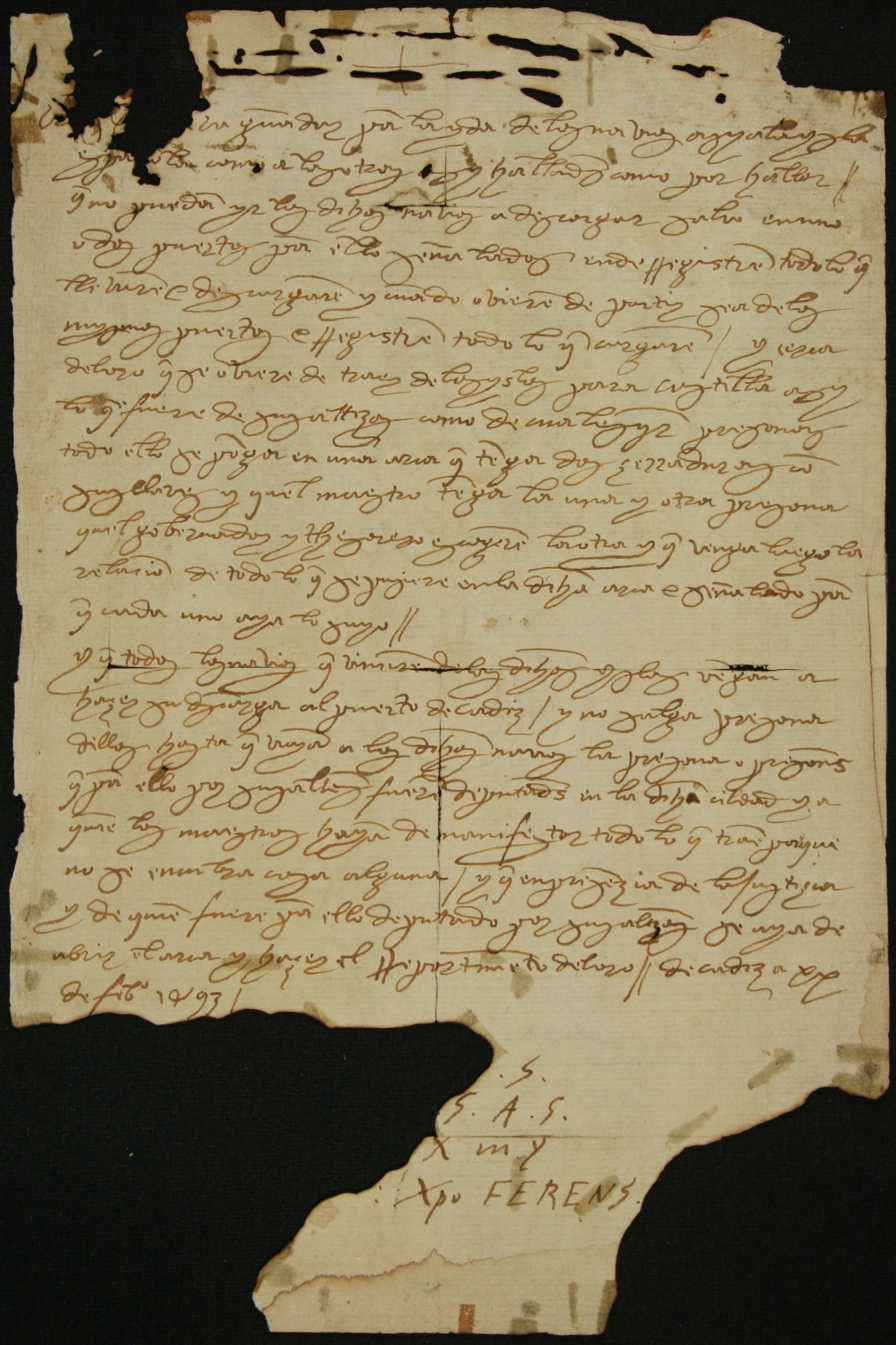
O'Gorman Columbian manuscript, signed by Christopher Columbus. February 20, 1493.

The O'Gorman Columbian manuscript (also known in Spanish as Ordenanza. Manuscrito Colombino O'Gorman Condumex) is a document written and signed by Christopher Columbus in the city of Cadiz, Spain, on February 20, 1493. It was named after its discoverer, the Mexican historian Edmundo O'Gorman.

== History of the document ==
According to O'Gorman, the manuscript was written and signed by Christopher Columbus during his return voyage to Spain, after his first expedition to the Americas. The document, signed in Cadiz on February 20, 1493, bears the signature Xro. FERENS, used by Columbus. The signature has sparked controversy because of how the letters are arranged over four lines.

In 1978, the document was authenticated. The manuscript refers to the newly discovered lands, then known as East Indies.

== Content of the document ==
In the document, Columbus presents his ideas on how the traffic among La Isla Española (currently Santo Domingo) and Haiti, and the other islands found by Spain should be. The manuscript also contains the appropriate norms for the gold search and its distribution among the Crown (the Monarchy of Spain), the colonists, and the admiral.

This document is valuable because of its transcendence, rareness, and historical importance. This is one of the documents that registers the first encounter of the Western civilization with the New World.
