= Ireland–Mexico relations =

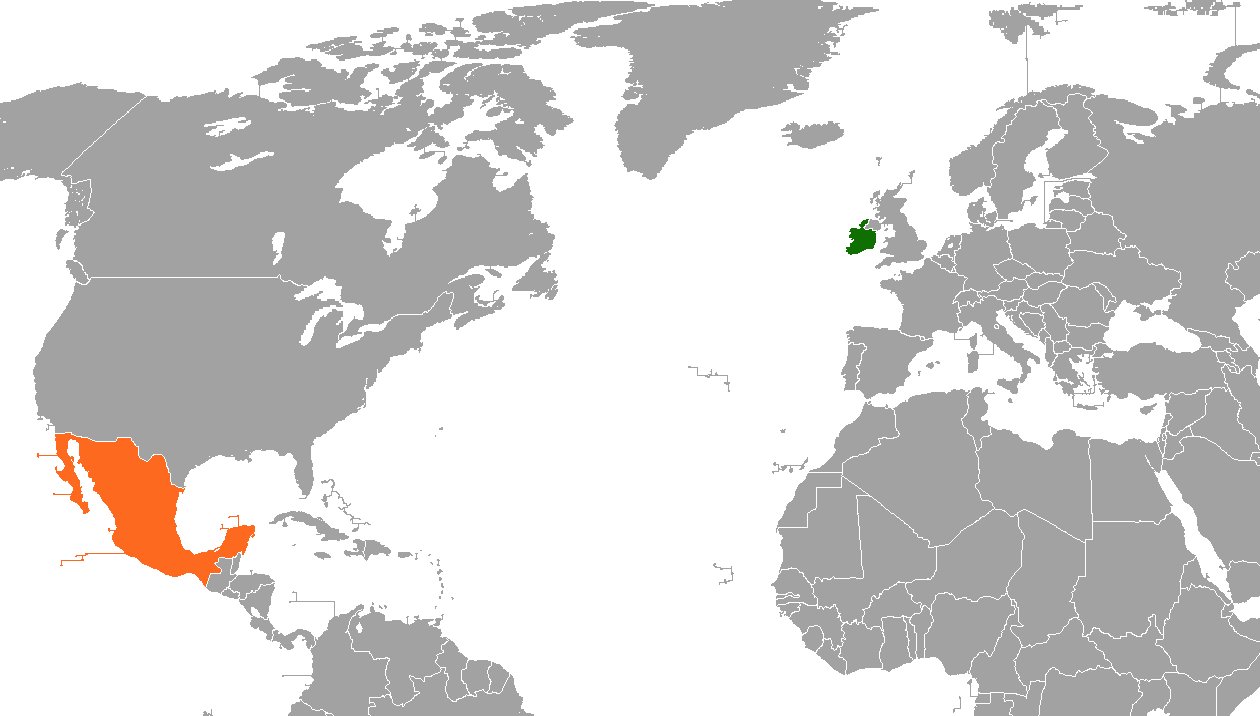

- Ireland: Mexico

The nations of Ireland and Mexico established diplomatic relations in August 21,1975. The relationship has been often associated with the Irish migration to Mexico. Both nations are members of the Organization for Economic Co-operation and Development, United Nations and the World Trade Organization. Rooted in historical context, both countries have a long-lasting relationship dating to the Mexican–American War (1846–1848). Through migration and historical ties, mutual exchanges have been visible in recent studies of both countries. Ireland and Mexico have developed increased relations during the period from the 19th century to today.

== History ==
Commemorative plaque placed at the San Jacinto Plaza in Mexico City. It states: "In memory of the Irish soldiers of the heroic St. Patrick's Battalion, martyrs who gave their lives for Mexico during the unjust invasion by the United States of 1847."

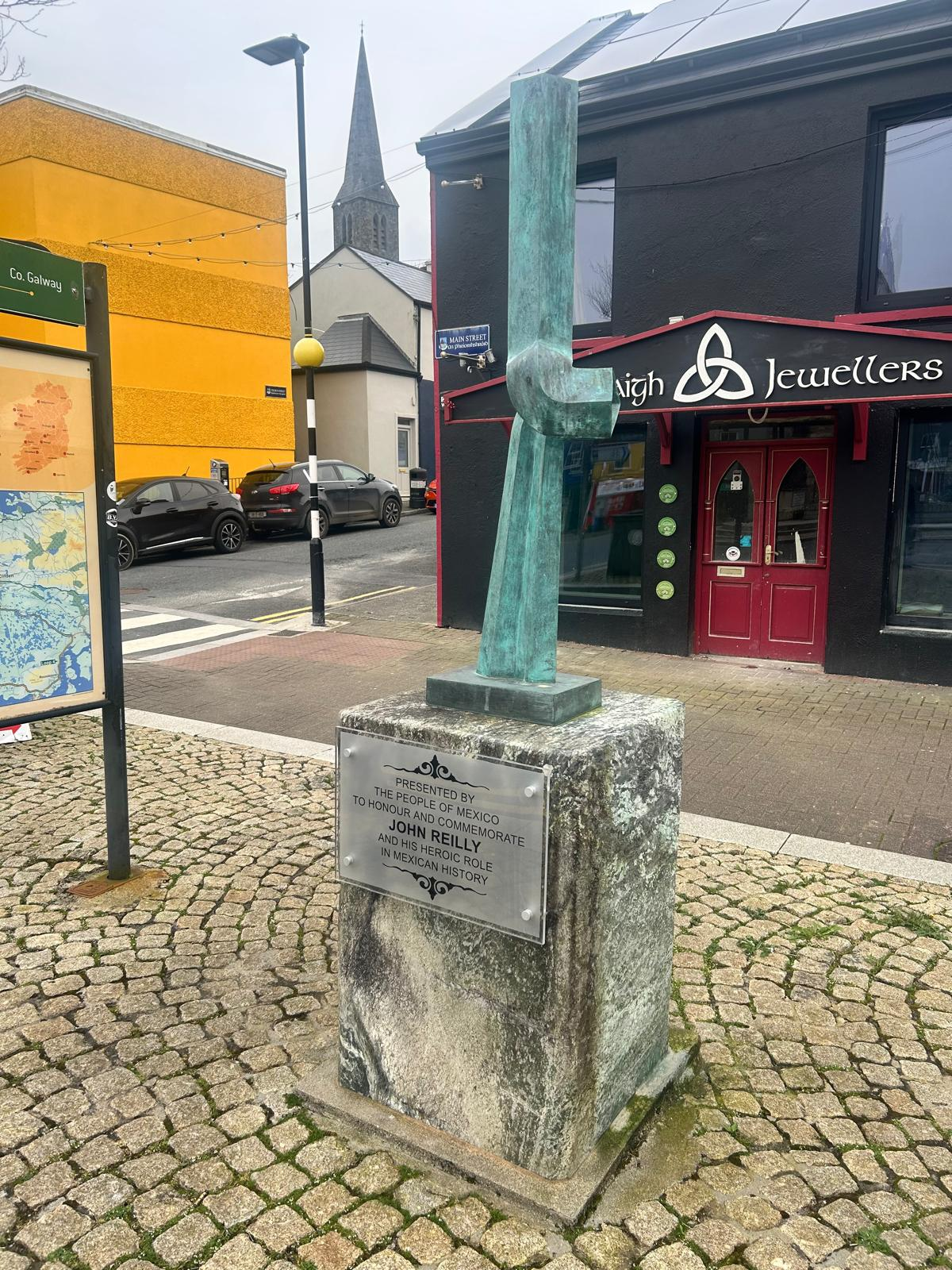
Commemorative monument placed at the Center of Connemara in Clifden, Ireland. It states: " Presented by the people of Mexico to honour and commemorate John Reilly and his heroic role in Mexican history."

During the Spanish colonization of Mexico, several Spanish Viceroys were of Irish descent, including Juan O'Donojú, who was the last Spanish Viceroy.During the Mexican–American War (1846–1848), many Irish-American immigrants abandoned their posts to join Mexican forces due to their solidarity through shared discrimination, and persecution of their Catholic faith by Protestant Americans.One of the most popular Irish battalions during the war was that of the Saint Patrick's Battalion, which fought for the Mexican side during both the Battle of Buena Vista and Battle of Churubusco in 1847, among others. Following the events of the war, a commemorative plaque was placed at the San Jacinto Plaza in Mexico City in honor of Saint Patrick's Battalion.

On 10 January 1974, both nations established diplomatic relations. At first, Mexico was accredited to Ireland from its embassy in London, and Ireland was accredited to Mexico from its embassy in Washington, D.C. In 1990, both nations agreed to open resident diplomatic missions and, in June 1991, Mexico opened its embassy on Raglan Road, Dublin; Ireland followed suit, opening its embassy in Mexico City in September 1999.

In January 1994, Taoiseach Albert Reynolds paid a visit to Mexico, becoming the first Irish head-of-State to do so. In 1999, Irish President Mary McAleese also paid a visit to Mexico. In November 2002, Mexican President Vicente Fox paid an official visit to Ireland, becoming the first Mexican leader to do so. There would be several high-level visits between leaders and representatives of both nations. In 2013, President Michael D. Higgins paid a visit to Mexico where he met with President Enrique Peña Nieto.

In October 2022, Mexican Foreign Undersecretary Carmen Moreno Toscano paid a visit to Ireland to attend the VIII political consultation reunion between both nations. During the reunion, both nations agreed on deepening bilateral collaboration on issues such as health, trade and investment promotion, diaspora and international migration. In January 2024, Tánaiste Micheál Martin paid a visit to Mexico and visited the new premises of the Irish Embassy in Mexico City and inaugurated Ireland's new Office for Central America which is housed in the embassy.

== High level visits ==
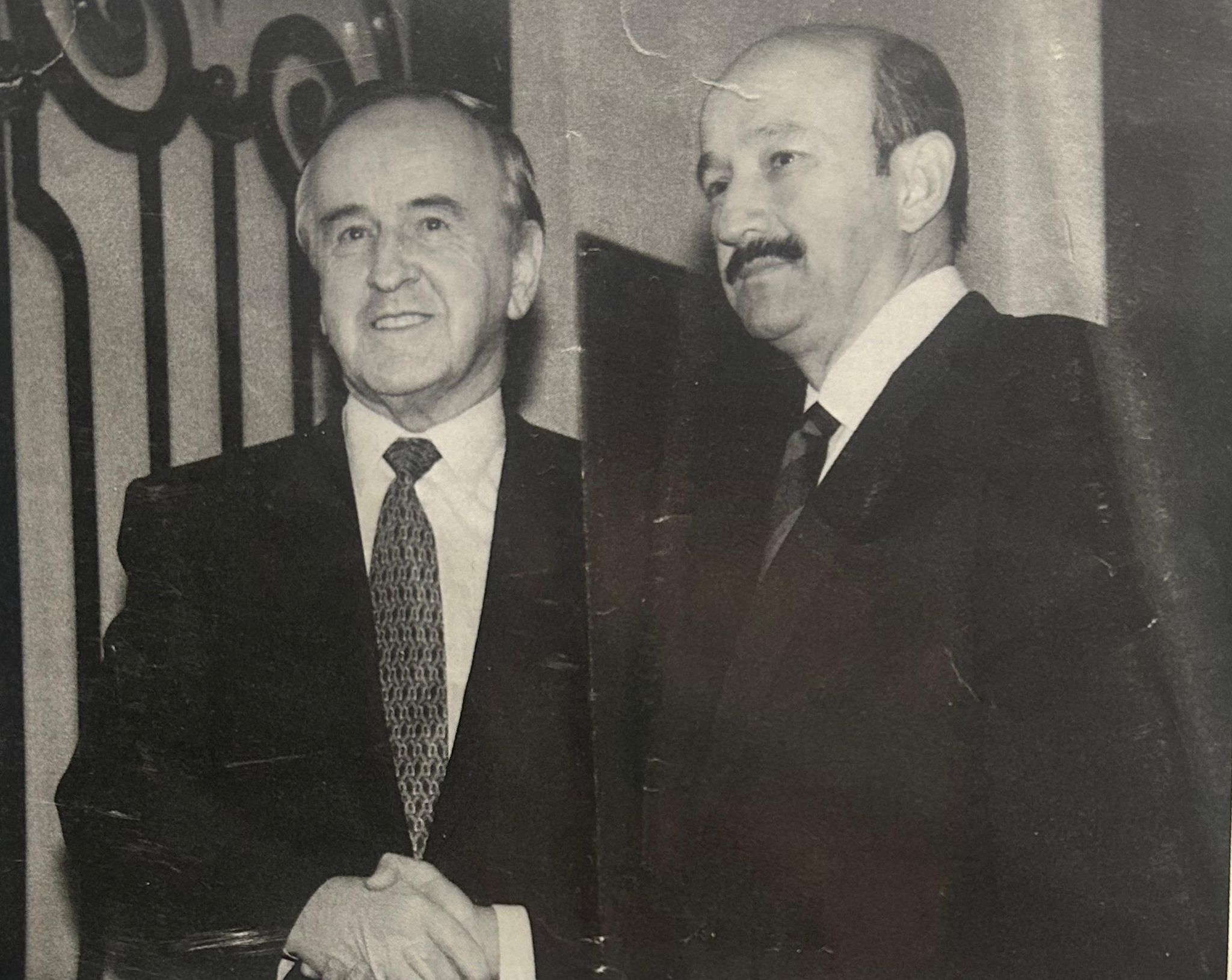
Irish Taoiseach Albert Reynolds and Mexican President Carlos Salinas de Gortari in Mexico City; January 1994.

High-level visits from Ireland to Mexico

- Foreign Minister Gerry Collins (1991)
- Taoiseach Albert Reynolds (1994)
- President Mary McAleese (1999)
- Taoiseach Bertie Ahern (2003, 2004)
- Foreign Minister Micheál Martin (2009)
- President Michael D. Higgins (2013)
- Secretary General of the Department of Foreign Affairs and Trade Niall Burgess (2015)
- Tánaiste Micheál Martin (2024)

High-level visits from Mexico to Ireland

- Foreign Secretary Fernando Solana (1990, 1992)
- Foreign Undersecretary Andrés Rozental Gutman (April & May 1991)
- Foreign Undersecretary Javier Barros Valero (1992)
- Foreign Secretary Rosario Green (1999)
- President Vicente Fox (2002)
- Foreign Undersecretary Lourdes Aranda Bezaury (2006, 2010)
- Minister of Health Salomón Chertorivski Woldenberg (2012)
- Minister of the Economy Idelfonso Guajardo (2014)
- Foreign Undersecretary Carlos de Icaza (2017)
- Foreign Undersecretary Carmen Moreno Toscano (2022)

== Cultural exchange ==
Many cultural highlights can be seen in both countries. Mexico City celebrates St. Patrick's Day every March 17th, honoring the traditional Irish holiday. With 73 pubs located in Mexico City, local businesses cook traditional Irish cuisine for customers. Staples of Irish produce are present in Mexican pubs. Guiness, Harp Smithwick's, Jameson among other alcoholic beverages can be served within these localities.Ireland recently published a governmental article articulating the ties between their holiday Samhain and el Dia de los Muertos. Both holidays revere the cycle of life in celebratory manner. While Samhain draws from pagan believes native to early Irish religion, el Dia de los Muertos dates from indigenous Aztec rituals and Catholic customs. In addition, Mexico and Ireland are working together to promote academic exchanges that will "promote student mobility." In 2022, Director General of European Union Division Maeve von Heynitz visited Tecnologico de Monterrey to discuss relationship ties between Irish universities and Tecnologico de Monterrey. The goal of this attempt is to promote English language immersions and laboral opportunities, given that Mexican citizens don't require a visa to enter Ireland.

== Agreements ==
Both nations have signed several bilateral agreements such as an Agreement to Avoid Double Taxation and Prevent Tax Evasion regarding Income and Capital Gains Taxes (1998); Agreement on Educational and Cultural Cooperation (1999); Memorandum of Understanding for Cooperation between the Mexican Secretariat of Foreign Affairs and Trinity College Dublin (2003); Memorandum of Understanding for the Establishment of a Mechanism of Consultation in Matters of Mutual Interest (2006); and an Agreement of Cooperation between the cities of Dublin and Mexico City (2015).

== Economic relations ==
In 1997, Mexico signed a Free Trade Agreement with the European Union (which includes Ireland). In 2023, two-way trade between both nations amounted to US$3.1 billion. Ireland's main exports to Mexico include pharmaceutical and health products such as medicines, machines and chemicals; parts for motor vehicles, electronic integrated circuits, dairy based products, and alcohol.Dublin, Ireland is currently an emerging technology hub. Mexico's main exports to Ireland include data processing machines, medical instruments and appliances, chemical based products, aircraft such as helicopters and airplanes, minerals and alcohol. Irish multinational companies such as Kerry Group and Smurfit Kappa (among others) operate in Mexico. Following the COVID- 19 pandemic, Global Ireland launched Ireland's Strategy for Latin America and the Caribbean to 2025, which aimed at pursuing mutual economic recoveries following the pandemic's recession.

== Drug trafficking ==
In 2013, Europol claimed that "…Mexican drug cartels are targeting Ireland and mainland Europe for their cocaine and cannabis trade," and that there was "…evidence of Mexican cartels using Ireland as a staging post for bringing drug shipments into Europe."

In 2016, it was revealed that an Irish gangland leader, Christy Kinahan, was working with the Sinaloa cartel to import cocaine from Peru.

In February 2024, 546kg of crystal meth worth €32 million was found in a container in the Port of Cork. The Sinaloa cartel were suspected to behind this importation. The Gardaí suspected an Irish-Mexican citizen was working with the cartel.

== Resident diplomatic missions ==
- Ireland has an embassy in Mexico City.
- Mexico has an embassy in Dublin.
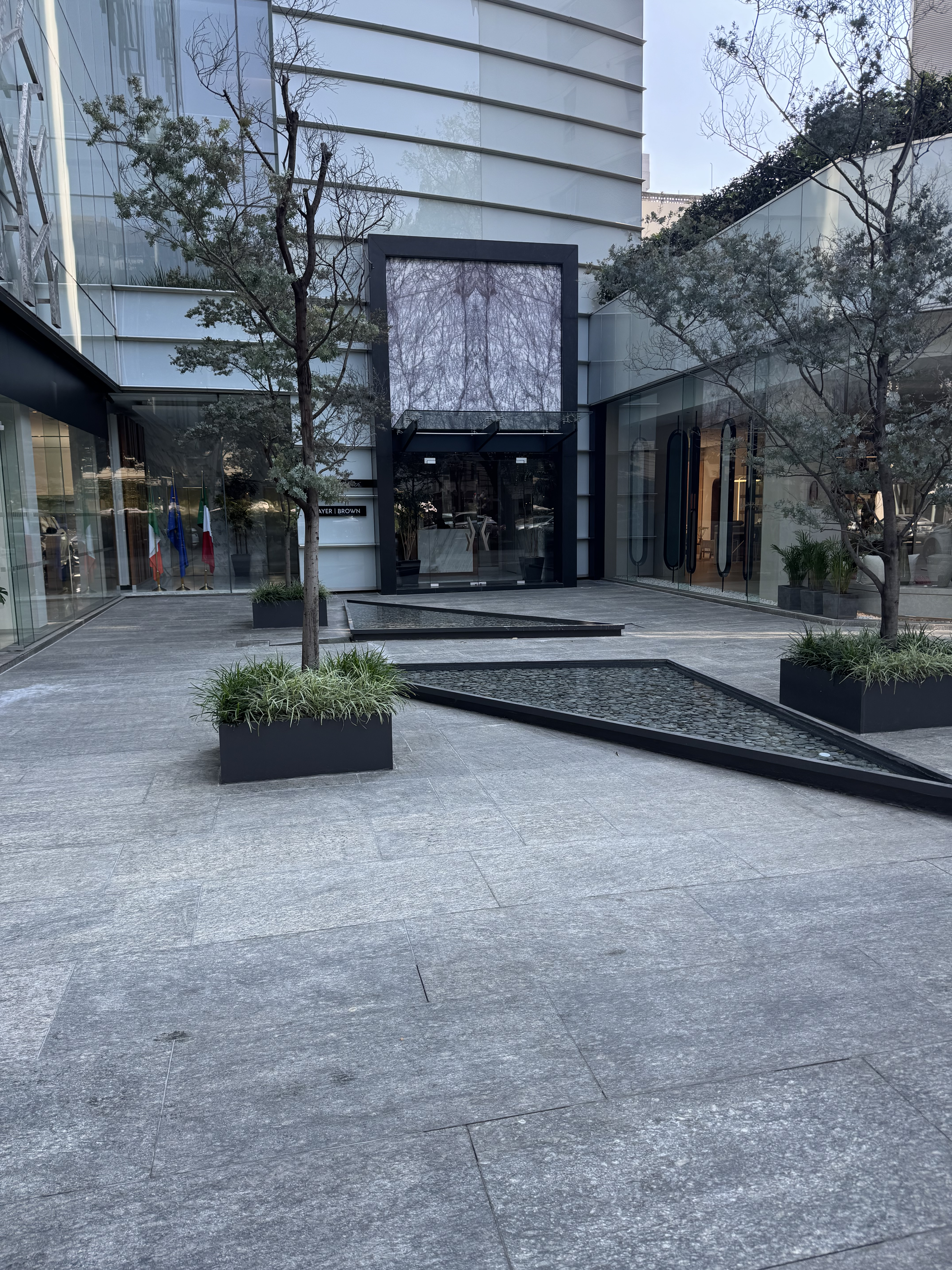
Embassy of Ireland in Mexico City

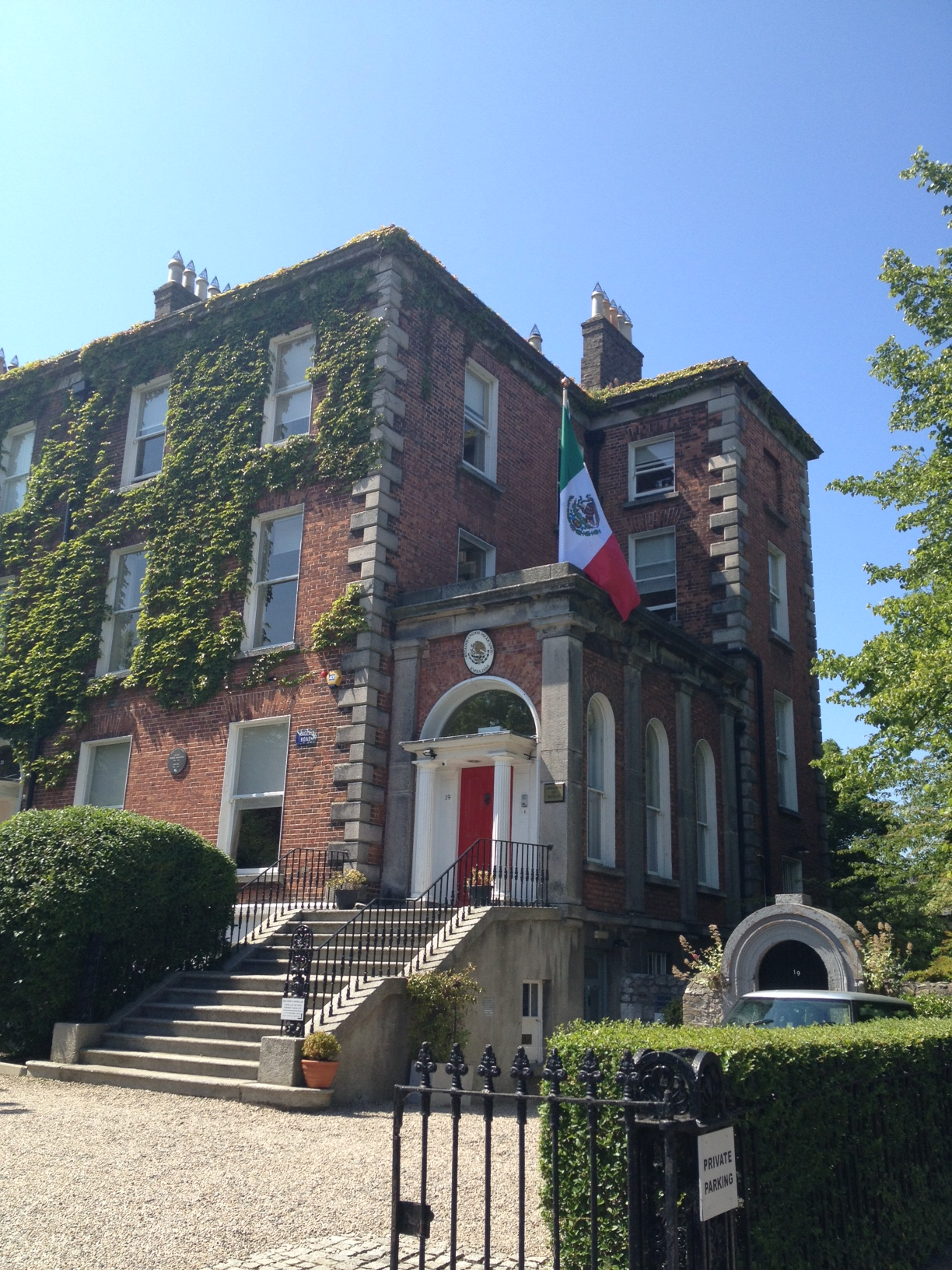
Embassy of Mexico in Dublin

== Gallery ==
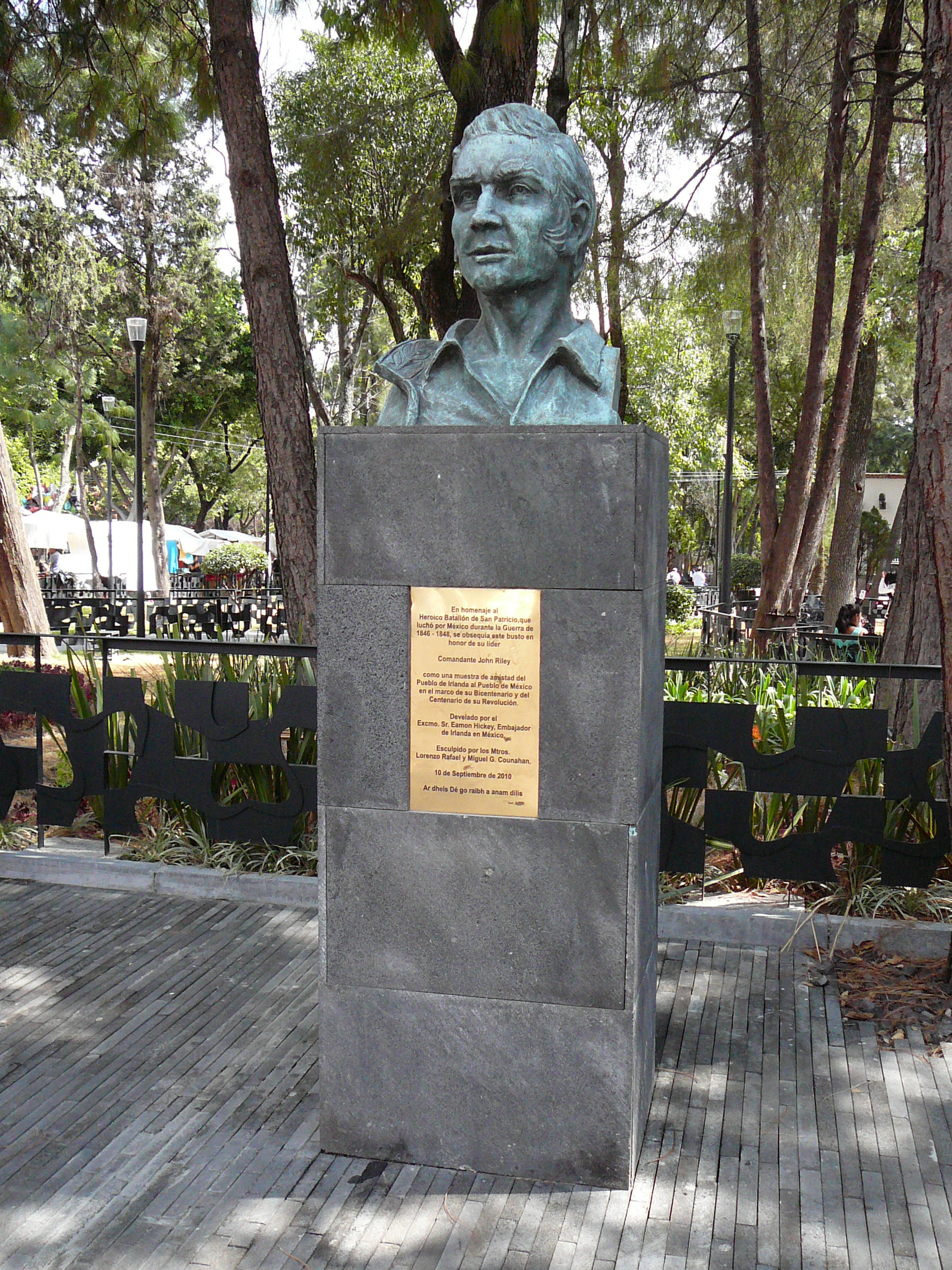
Bust of Irish soldier John Riley of the Saint Patrick's Battalion in Mexico City

Mexican Navy training ship, the ARM Cuauhtémoc, in Dublin Bay; 2012

Plaque commemorating Mexican pilot Ruben Ocaña Rubio of his aerial feat to Mallow, County Cork

Foreign Ministers Claudia Ruiz Massieu of Mexico; Sebastian Kurz of Austria and Charles Flanagan of Ireland in New York City; 2015

Flags of Mexico and Ireland during the Saint Patrick's Day parade in Mexico City

Mexican participation in the Saint Patrick's Day parade in Cork

== See also ==
- Irish Mexicans
- San Patricio, Jalisco
