= Central Library (UNAM) =

Main library of the National Autonomous University of Mexico

Central Library UNAM
- Biblioteca Central UNAM
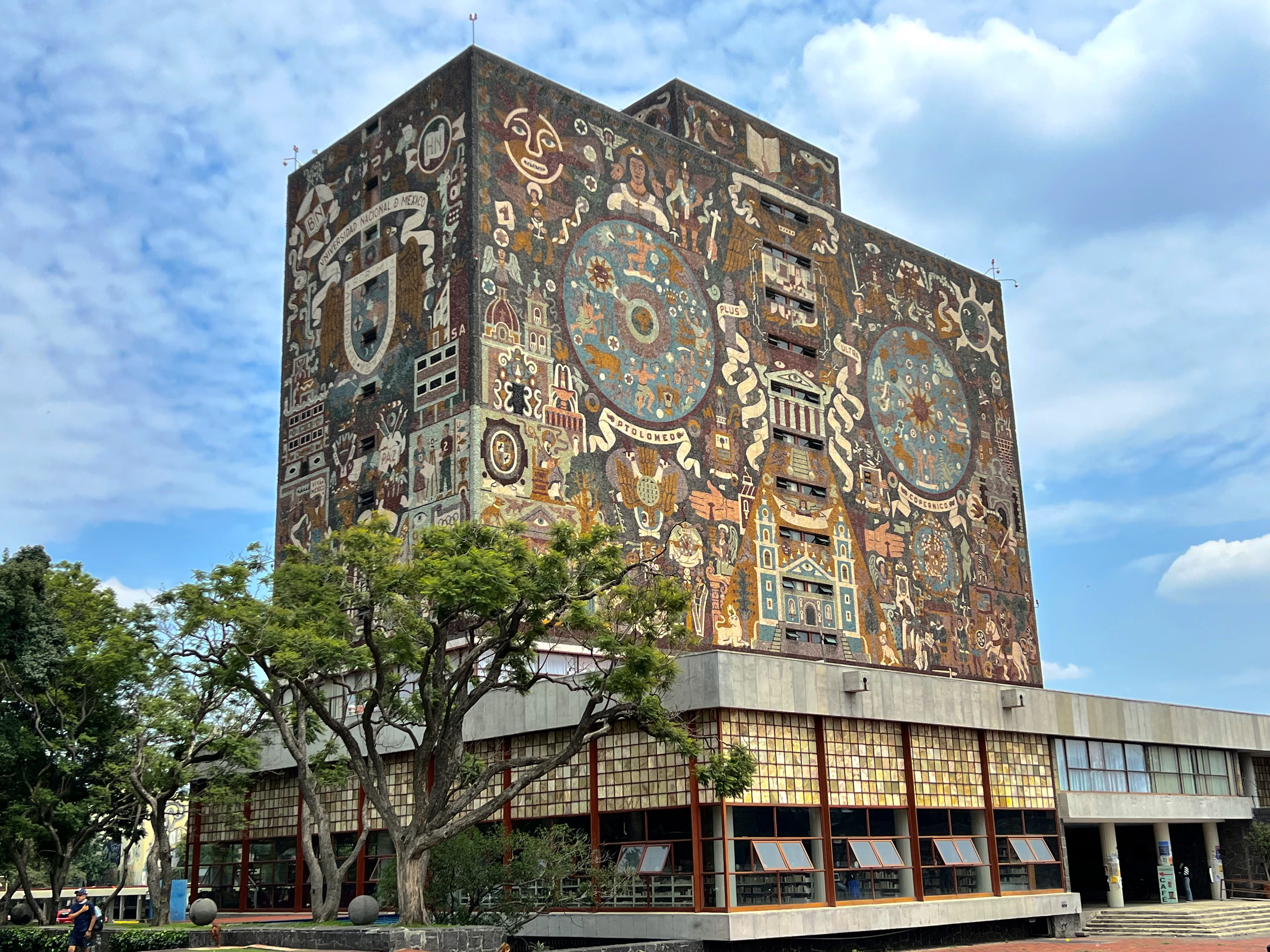
- View from the south-west corner (2022)
- 19°20′01″N 99°11′14″W
- Location: Coyoacán, Mexico City, Mexico
- Type: Academic library
- Established: 5 April 1956 (70 years ago)
- Branches: 1

Collection
- Items collected: Books, journals, newspapers, magazines, databases, maps, stamps, prints, drawings and manuscripts

Other information
- Website: bibliotecacentral.unam.mx

The Central Library of the National Autonomous University of Mexico (UNAM) is the main library in the Ciudad Universitaria Campus. It holds one of the largest collections in Mexico. It has a multidisciplinary approach for all the university courses from the adjacent faculties.

The building is covered with the mosaic mural Historical Representation of Culture, created by the Mexican artist Juan O'Gorman. His unique masterpiece has become the most iconic building from the UNAM. In July 2007, the UNESCO proclaimed the Central Library, along with the Central Campus of the University City, as World Heritage.

The Central Library hosts some of the administrative offices of the General Libraries Directorate of the UNAM. The library opened to users on April 5, 1956.

After 25 years, it underwent its first remodel (1981–1983), changing from closed to open shelves.

== Collection ==
In 2017 the Central Library holds 1,445,118 volumes, including: 589,418 books; 323,452 journal and magazine issues; 9 subscriptions to Mexican newspapers; 2,687 brochures and 8,616 multimedia CDs. It also has 520,936 theses, and 299,057 of them are available for full-text access online.

== Services ==
The Central Library offers the following services:

- Book loan (registered users only)
- Self check-out module (registered users only)
- Online loan renewal
- Information retrieval service
- Visual and motor disability equipment
- Computer room
- Photocopy
- Guided visits

== Architecture ==
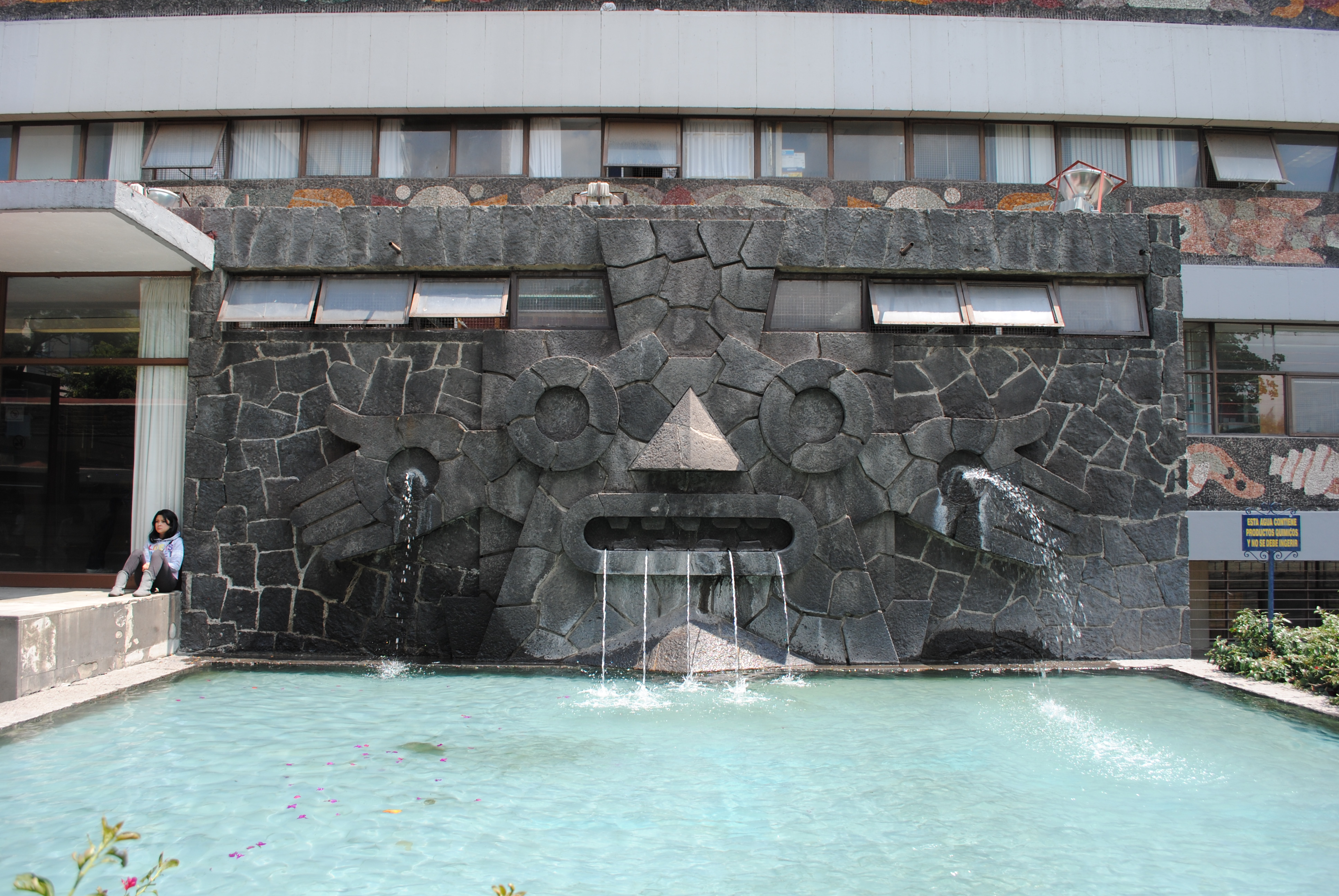
One of the building's two fountains

The Central Library encompasses an area of 16 thousand square meters and is built on a platform three-meter above the terrain, Two basalt fountains and decorative reliefs inspired by pre-Hispanic art were placed at the base of the building. The color of the stone in these elements is in plain view, done to take advantage of the stone's texture as an aesthetic and expressive element and to give a sense of continuity to the external pavement.

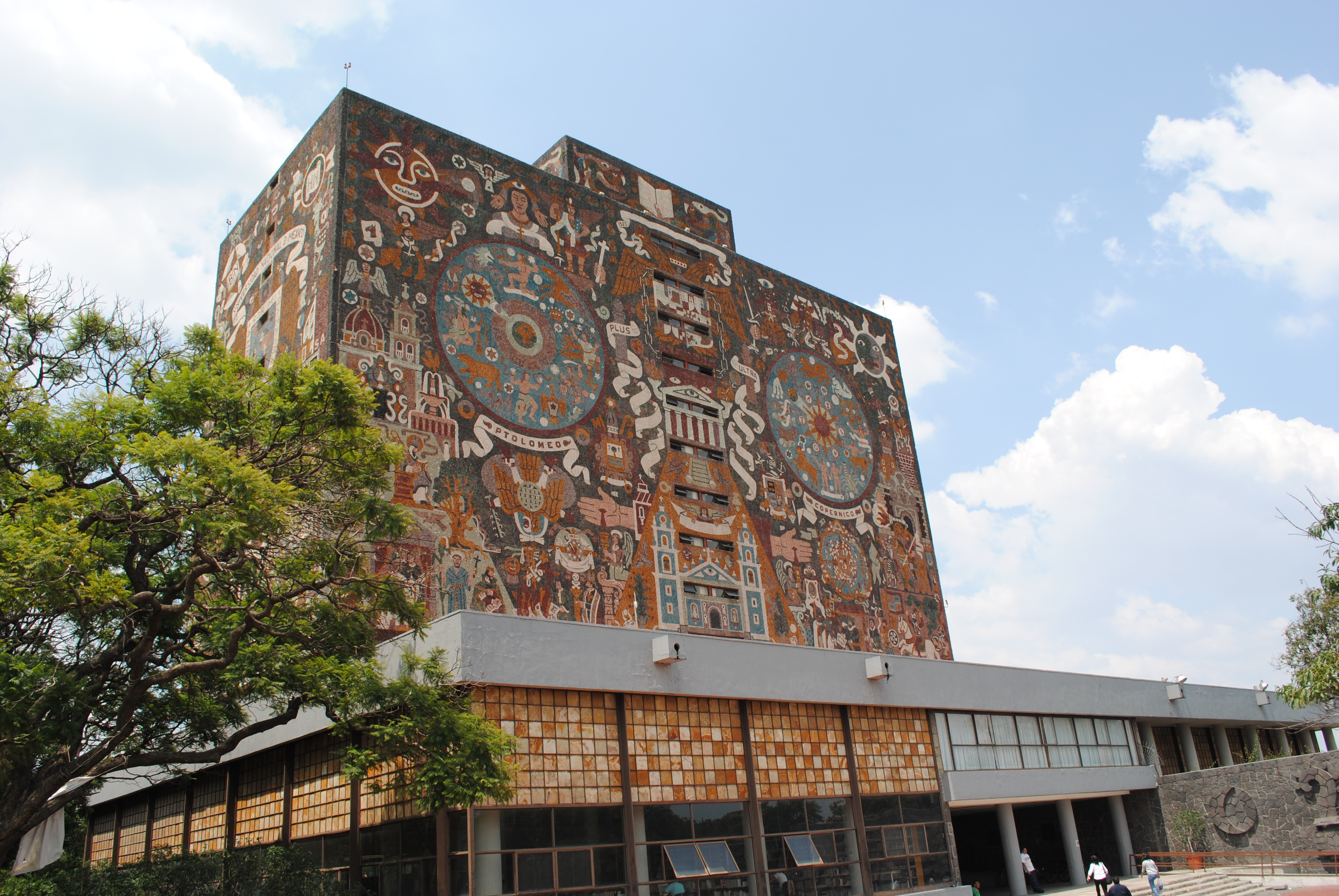
Juan O'Gorman's mural Historical Representation of Culture covers the entire facade of the upper ten floors.

The project included ten windowless floors for book storage, each having enough space for 120 thousand volumes. These storage areas have the necessary lighting, temperature and humidity conditions for book conservation. In the reading room, flanked by a garden on each side, the diffuse and matte light is filtered through thin tecali stone slabs. The service areas of a library of such proportions were placed in the semi-basement of the building.

The façades were covered with natural colored stones that shaped the mural titled Historical Representation of the Culture. The mural, one of the largest in the world is created using tiles of 12 colors that, when viewed from a distance, produce various hues.

== Murals ==
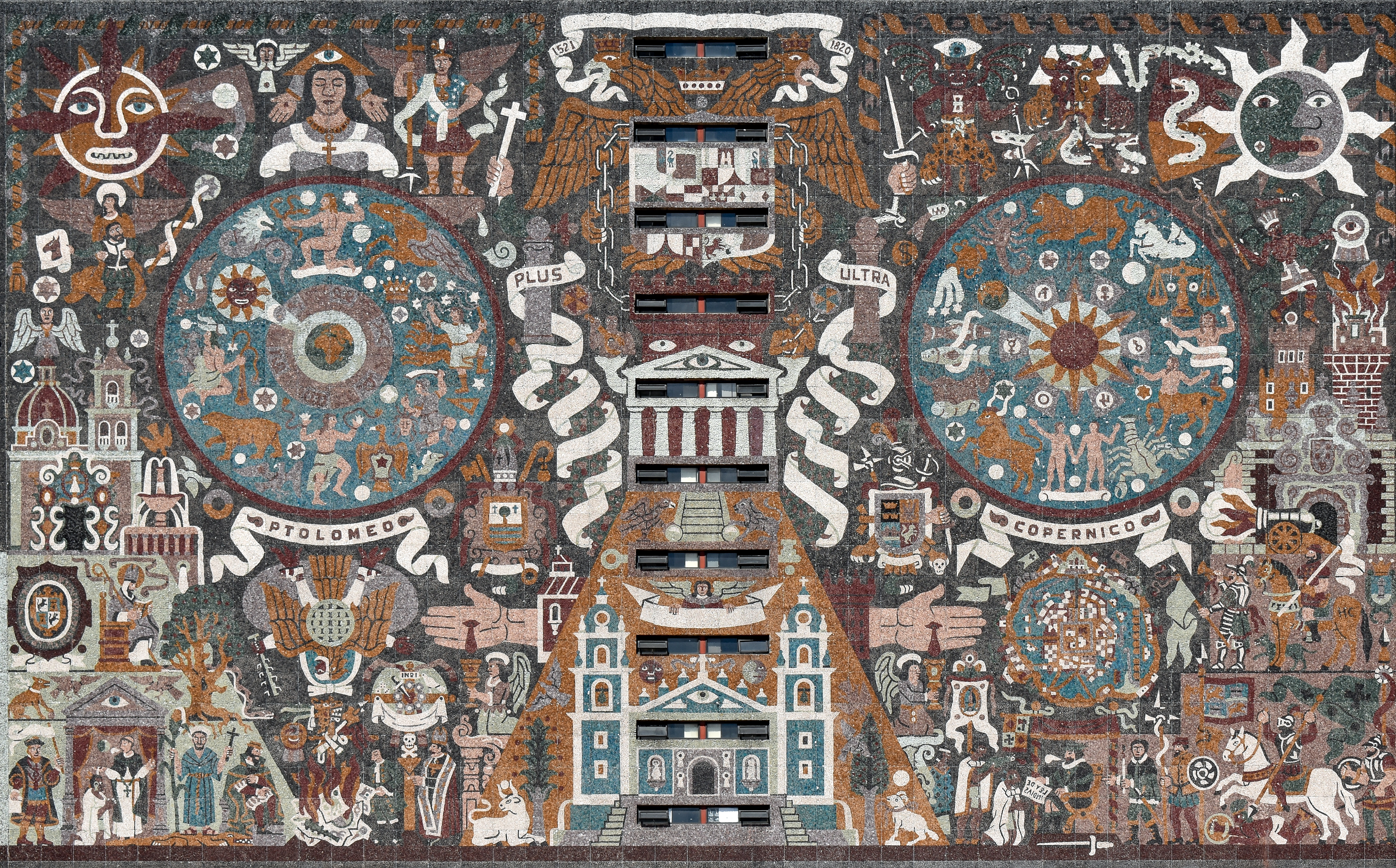
The building's South Wall

The outside murals are entirely built from stone tiles, which were brought from different places in Mexico and classified by color prior to their placement. The colors seen in the mural are the natural colors of the tiles, not paint, which O'Gorman chose in order to create an artwork that would endure the passage of time in an outdoor setting.

The idea for the murals was proposed by O'Gorman to Carlos Lazo (Manager of the Ciudad Universitaria project). Lazo was excited, especially by the idea of making a mural made just out of thousands of colored tiles, something that never had been done at that scale.

According to the artist, in each of the four walls that make up the surface of the mosaic, he represented three fundamental historical facets of the Mexican culture: the pre-Hispanic era, the most ancient facet; the Spanish colonial era, and the modern age as a result of the two previous periods.

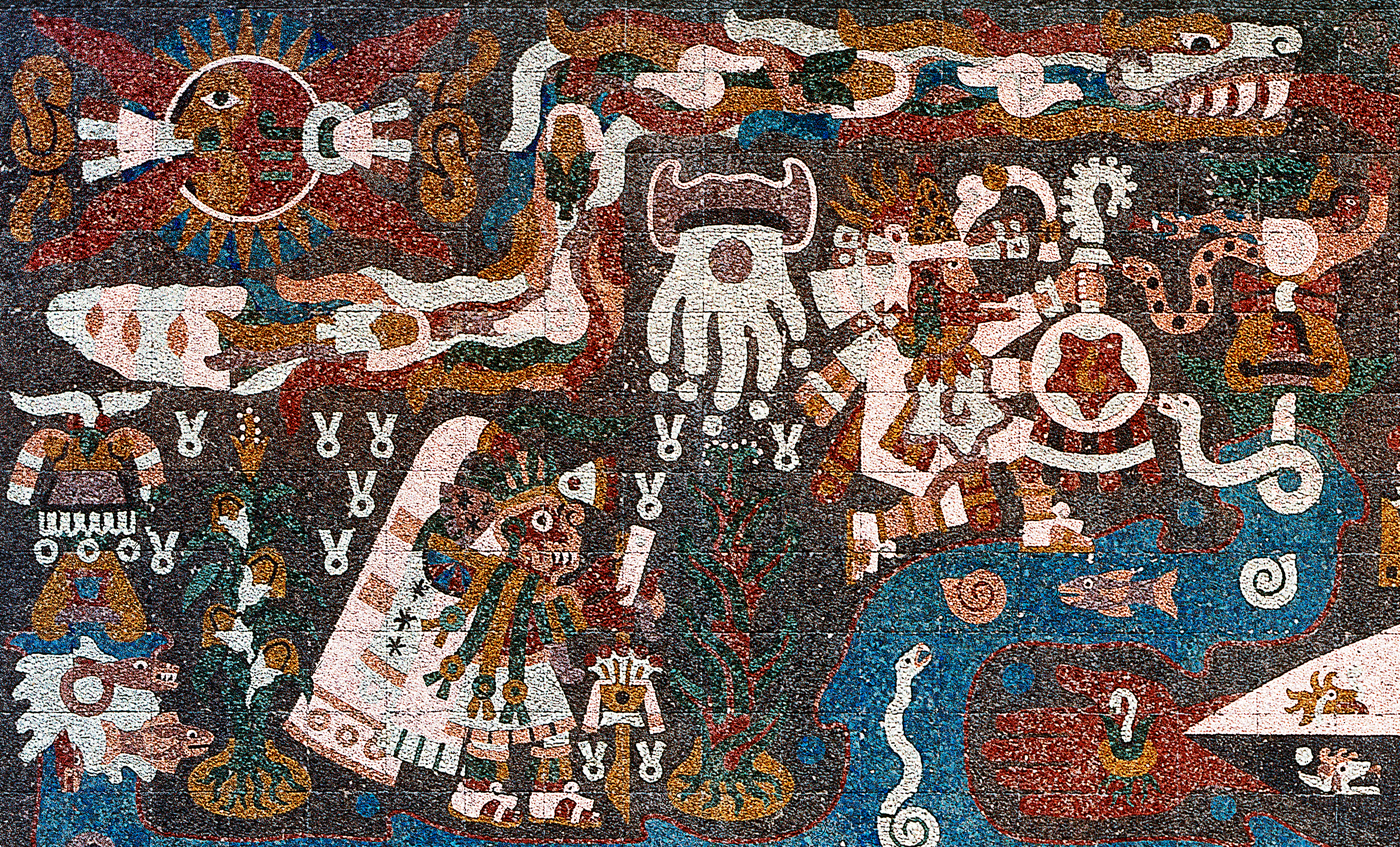
A detail of the building's North Wall

=== North Wall: Pre-Hispanic past ===
This wall corresponds to the pre-Hispanic era and puts into play the life-death duality. This wall is dominated by mythical elements. On the left side of the main axis, separated into three different planes, we can see deities and scenes pertaining to the life-creating principle: on the upper corner is the Sun, framed by Quetzalcoatl in the guise of a serpent; below this, the figure of Tlaloc emerges carrying a mat on his back; the section is complemented by Huitzilopochtli holding a shield and the Xiucoatl, the precious serpent. In the central section, we see Tlazolteotl, the earth goddess, surrounded by the eagle, a solar attribute, and by the jaguar, the symbol of the night. Inside a temple in this there is Teccistecatl, a masculine deity associated to the Moon and to fertility. On the lower part of this wall is a ritual ceremony of a propitiatory nature, in which the sacred meaning of the war is emphasized. The right-hand side of the mural represents the antithesis of life: the world of mystery, that of the dark side of things, of evil and death. Here we can perceive Quetzalcoatl's serpent drawn by using chalchihuitls (jade-like stones) and shells; below the serpent que can contemplate the image of Chalchiutlicue, the water goddess, and in front of her is a bonfire where her son is being sacrificed in order to give birth to the Moon; besides this scene, we find Tezcatlipoca, the creative principle and lord of the sorcerers, accompanied by a skull. The center of this part of the wall is dominated by the dual representation of Mictlantecuhtli-Quetzalcoatl, in the lower area we find images of warriors along with prisoners of war that complement the chapter related to human sacrifice.

The vertical axis of the composition shows Tonatiuh as the primeval source of the life cycle whose permanence is guaranteed by the sacrifices of men and gods. In this part of the mural, we can perceive a black and white ellipse divided into two, whose formal composition is based on the Mexica cosmogonical belief that the shape of the universe is composed of two joined ellipses. This one features Tlaloc glyphs related to tonalpohualli, the most important ritual calendar of the Mexican people. Said calendar was the center of their celebrations and their astronomical calculations. The finishing stroke to this side of the mural is an image of the myth concerning the founding of the city of Mexico-Tenochtitlan.

=== South Wall: Colonial past ===
This mural explore the conquest by the Spanish, which included both religious elements and great violence. This mural depicts angels and churches as well as fortresses, shields and cannons.

=== East Wall: Contemporaneous world ===
This wall explores tradition and progress and other binaries, including the sun and moon, as well as urban industrial workers and rural peasants. It also depicts Emiliano Zapata holding a flag with his slogan "Land and Liberty".

=== West Wall: The university and modern Mexico ===
The west wall includes the crest of the university and details about Mexican culture includes Aztec pyramids, as well as contemporary references to science, technology and sports.

== See also ==
- UNAM—Universidad Nacional Autonoma de Mexico
- List of libraries in Mexico
