= Juan O'Gorman =

Mexican artist and architect (1905–1982)

- Born: 6 July 1905; Coyoacán, Mexico
- Died: 18 January 1982 (aged 76); Mexico City, Mexico
- Education: Academy of San Carlos; Art and Architecture School at National Autonomous University of Mexico
- Movement: Functionalism, Mexican muralism
- Patrons: Diego Rivera, Frida Kahlo

Juan O'Gorman (6 July 1905 – 18 January 1982) was a Mexican painter and architect.

== Early life and family ==
Juan O'Gorman was born on 6 July 1905 in Coyoacán, then a village to the south of Mexico City and now a borough of the city, to an Irish immigrant father, Cecil Crawford O'Gorman and Encarnación O'Gorman Moreno. His parents were distant cousins. He had three younger siblings, Edmundo, Margarita and Tomás. Despite his father's influence, O'Gorman chose to focus on architecture early in his career. In 1927, he graduated from Academy of San Carlos, the Art and Architecture school at the National Autonomous University of Mexico.

His first marriage was to Nina Wright, Russian-American architect. He later married Helen Fowler, an American artist with whom he had an adopted daughter.

== Career ==
=== San Ángel houses ===
In 1929, O'Gorman purchased a plot containing two tennis courts in Mexico City's San Ángel colonia. On the plot, O'Gorman constructed a small house and studio intended for use by his father, now known as the Cecil O'Gorman House. The building's forms were strongly influenced by the work of Le Corbusier, whose theories of architecture O'Gorman studied. O'Gorman dubbed the house the first functionalist structure in Latin America.

Diego Rivera, a contemporary of O'Gorman, impressed with the design of the Cecil O'Gorman House, commissioned the architect to design a home for him and Frida Kahlo on an adjacent plot (O'Gorman and Kahlo had been friends since high school in Coyoacan). The house was built in a similar functionalist style from 1931 to 1932. The Rivera-Kahlo house was two houses connected by a bridge. Both houses were purchased to be restored and opened to the public with the Rivera-Kahlo house operating as a museum.

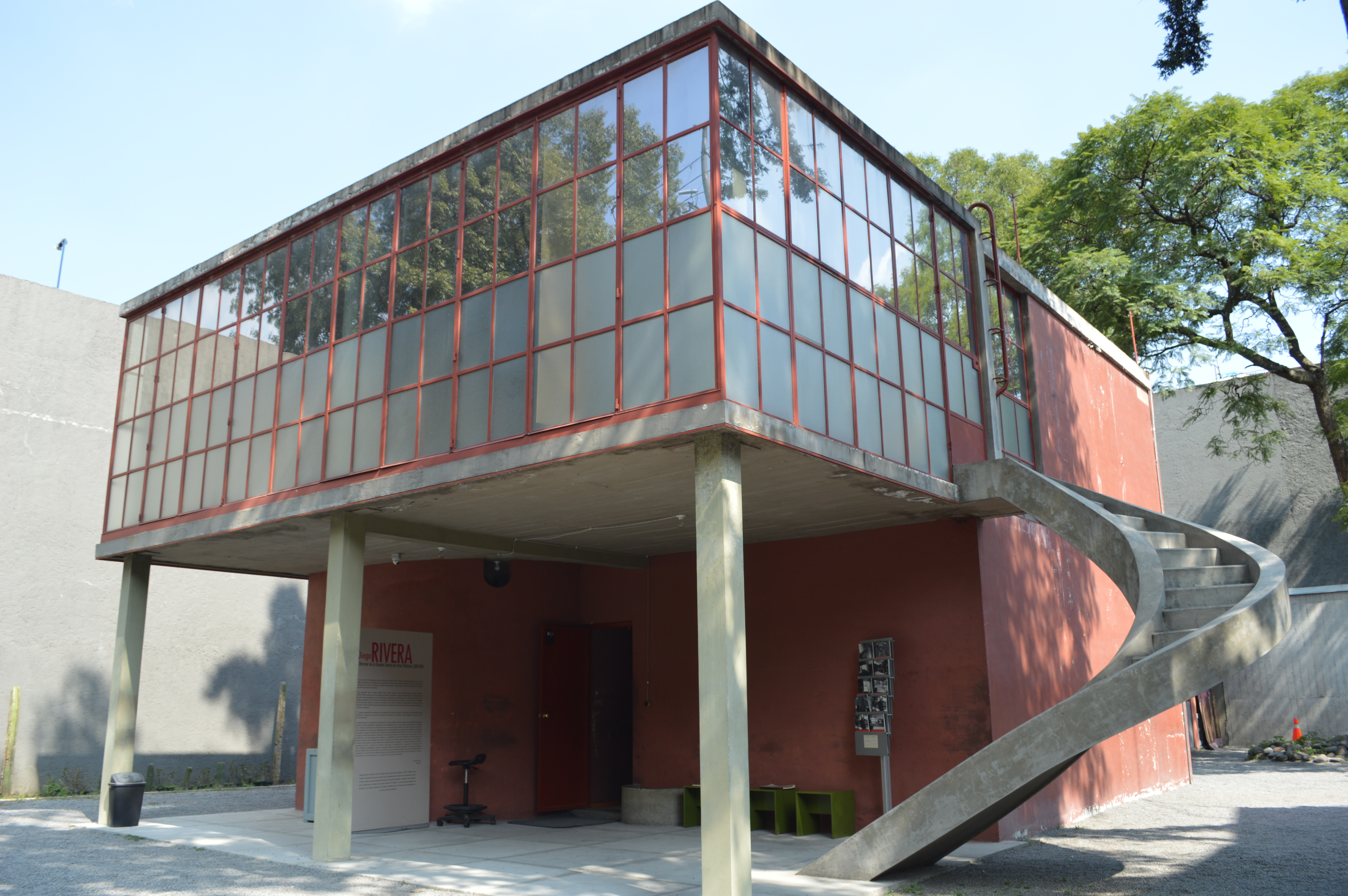
The 1929 Cecil O'Gorman House

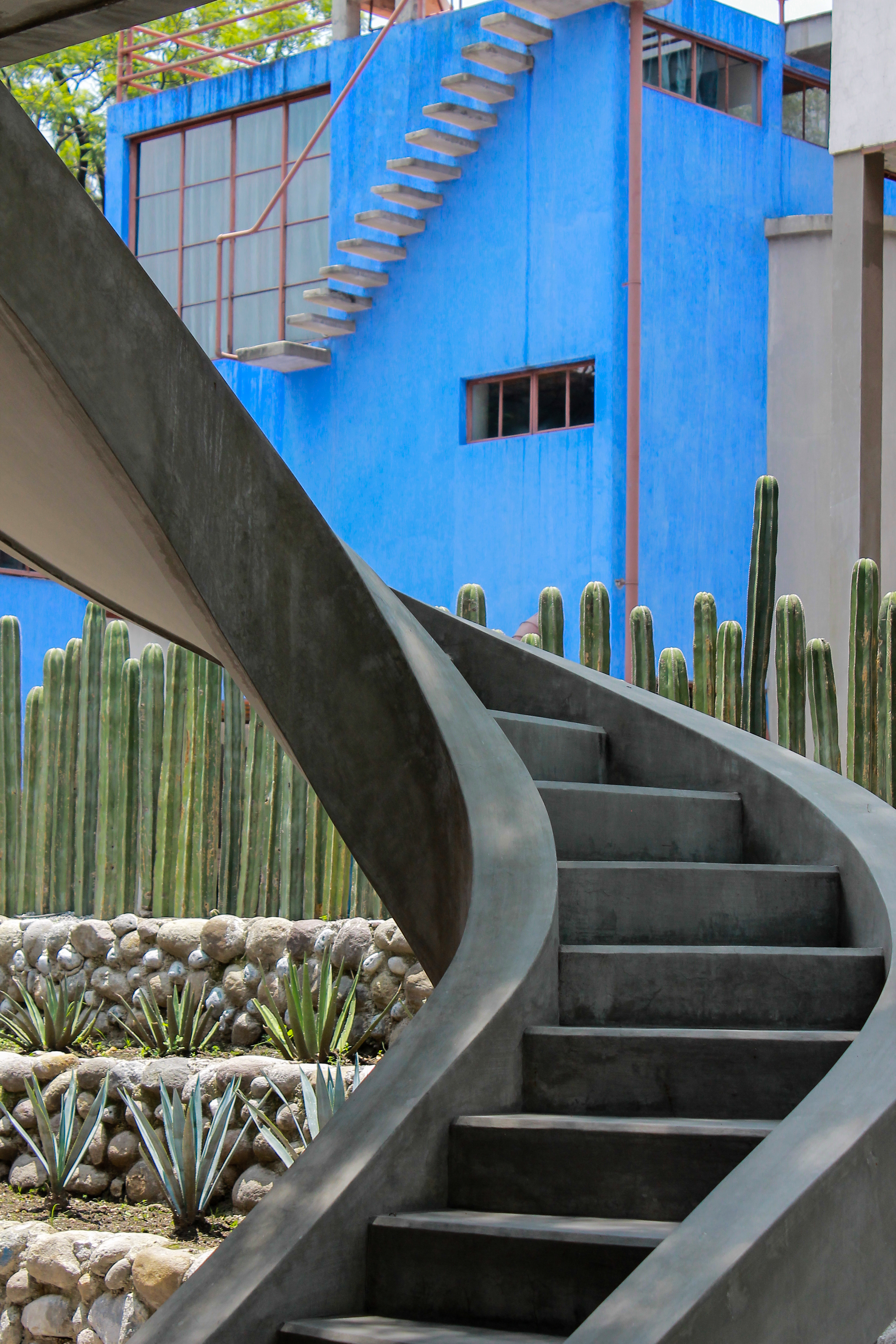
The exterior staircase of the Cecil O'Gorman house.

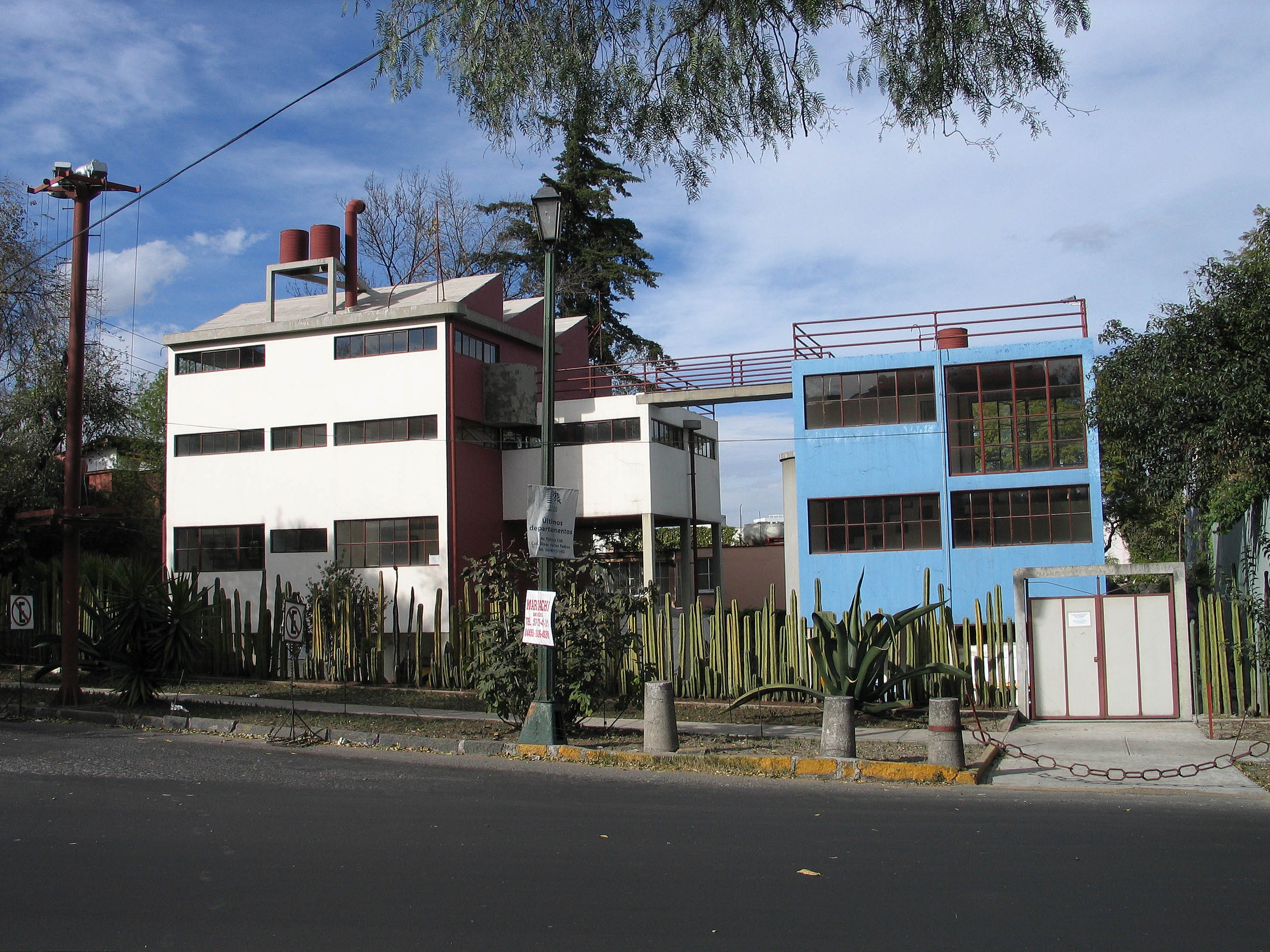
The Rivera-Kahlo house as visible from the street

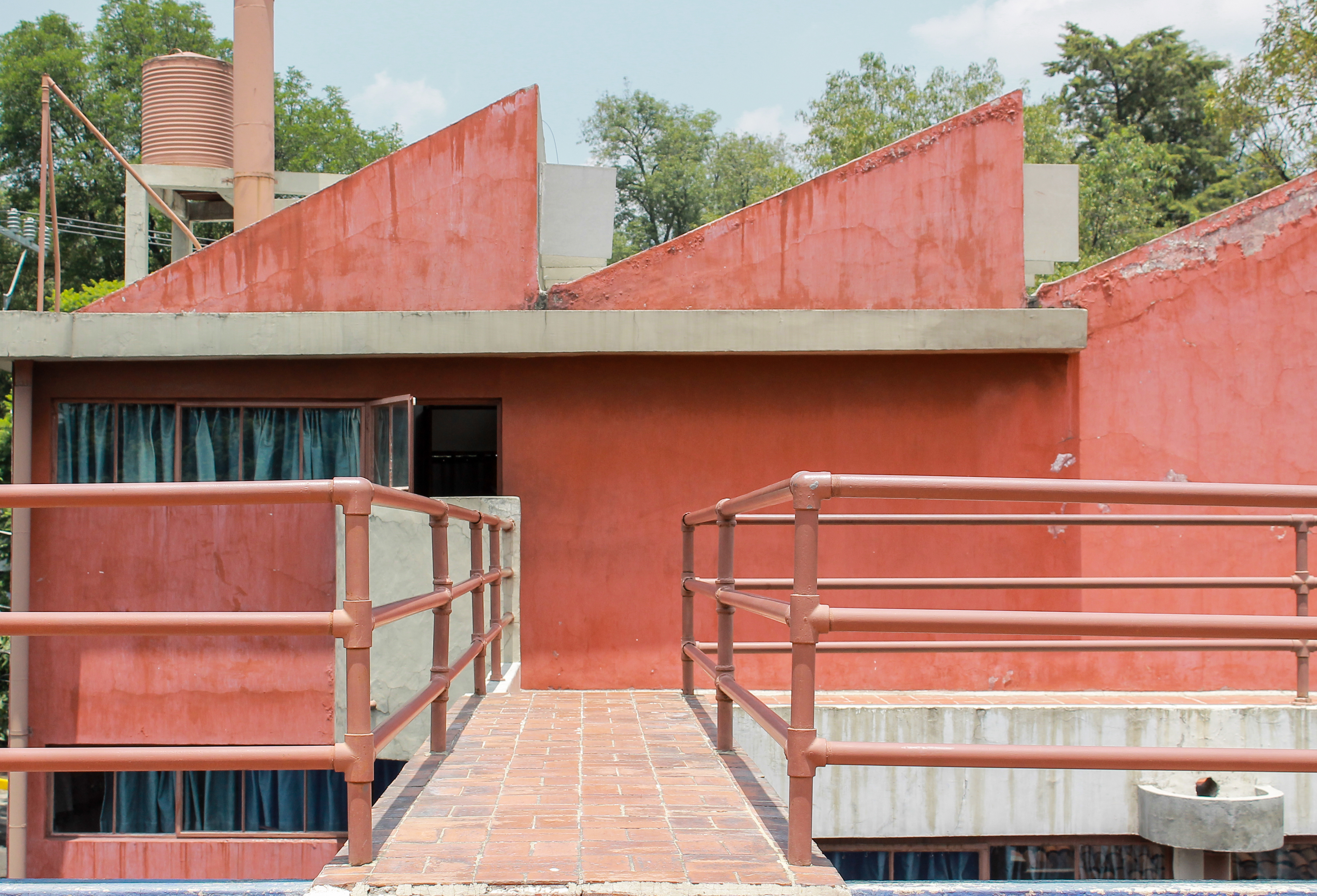
A bridge connects the two divisions of the Rivera-Kahlo house

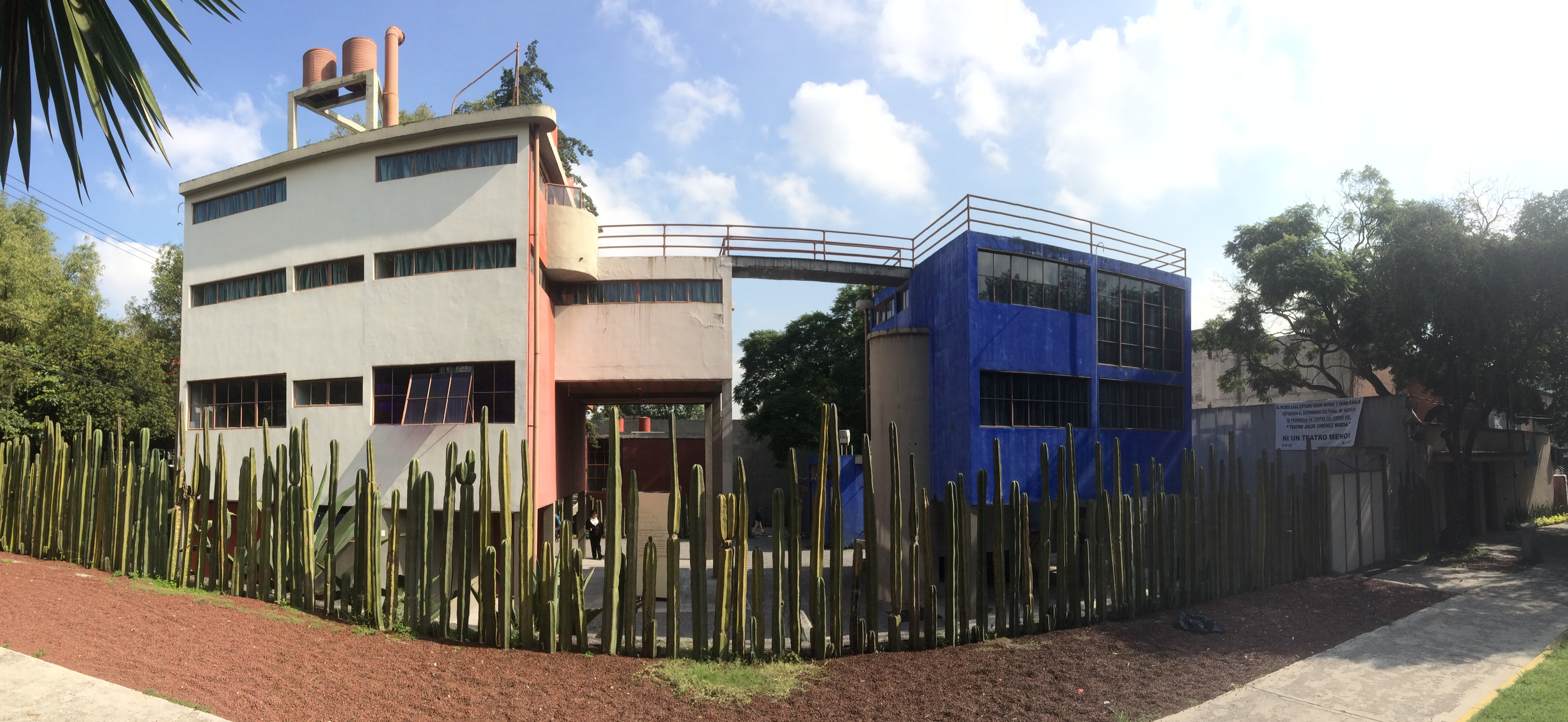
Panorama of Rivera-Kahlo house

=== Schools ===
In 1932, Narciso Bassols, then Secretary of Education, appointed O'Gorman to the position of Head of Architectural Office of the Ministry of Public Education, where he went on to design and build 26 elementary schools in Mexico City. The schools were built with the philosophy of "eliminating all architectural style and executing constructions technically."

After 6 years of functionalist projects, O'Gorman turned away from strict functionalism later in life to focus on painting and murals, including works at the Mexico City airport in 1937 and "Credit Transforms Mexico" for the International Bank on Reforma Avenue, now moved to HSBC.

After being asked by Edgar Kaufmann Sr. to submit a proposal for murals for the Pittsburgh Young Men's & Women's Hebrew Association, O'Gorman spent a weekend at Fallingwater, which inspired him to return to architecture, this time a more organic architecture, combining the influence of Frank Lloyd Wright with traditional Mexican constructions.

=== Central Library at Ciudad Universitaria (UNAM) ===
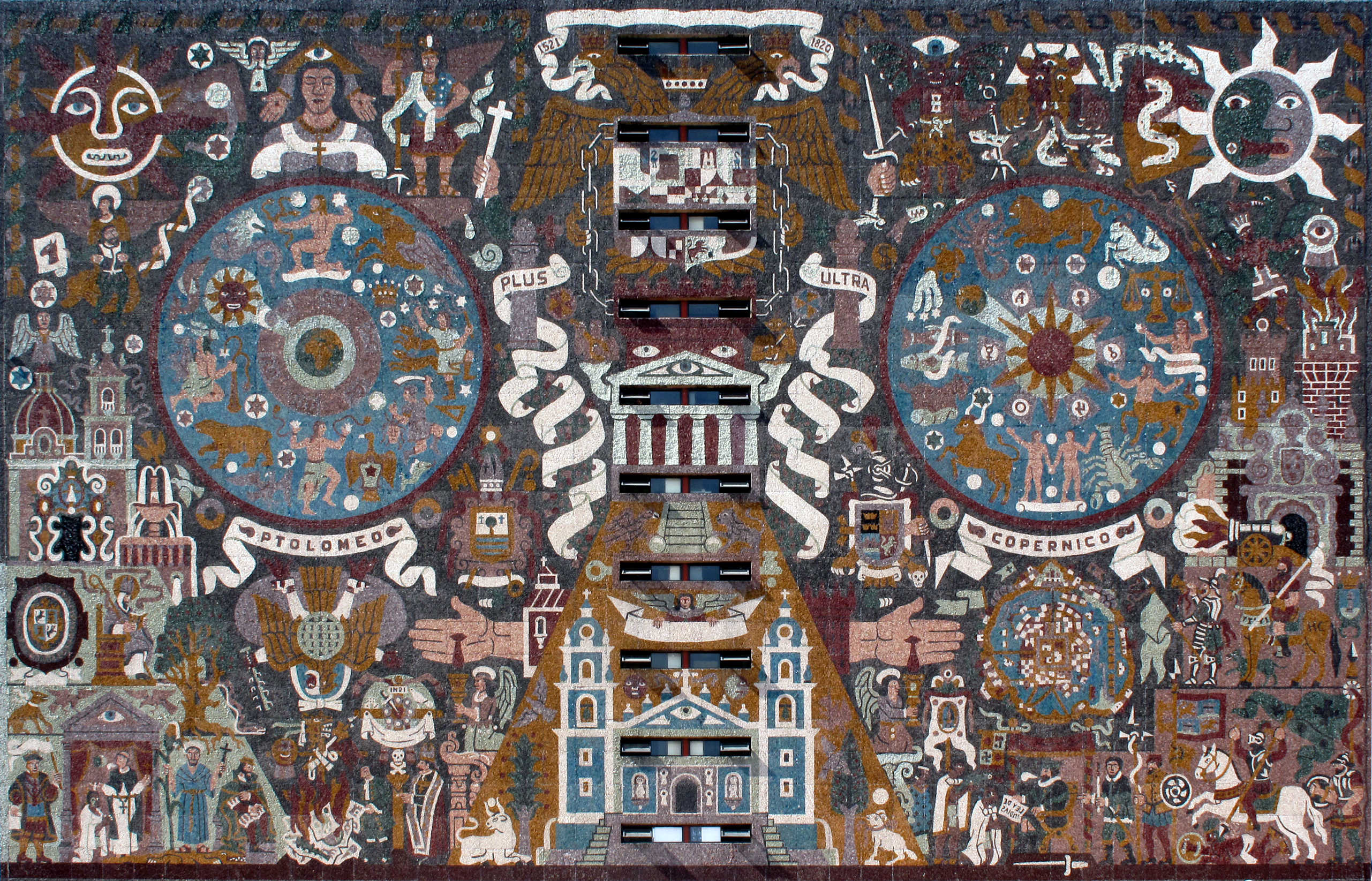
O'Gorman's mural Historical Representation of Culture on the Central Library at UNAM

Juan O'Gorman's most celebrated work due to its creativity, construction technique, and dimensions, are the four thousand square meters murals covering the four faces of the building of the Central Library at Ciudad Universitaria at UNAM. These murals are mosaics made from millions of colored stones that he gathered all around Mexico in order to be able to obtain the different colors he needed. The north side pictures Mexico's pre-Hispanic past and the south facade its colonial one, while the east wall depicts the contemporary world, and the west shows the university and contemporary Mexico.

From the beginning, I had the idea of making mosaics of colored stones in the walls of the collections, with a technique in which I was already well experienced. With these mosaics the library would be different from the other buildings of Ciudad Universitaria, and it would be given a particular Mexican character.

=== Later work ===
O'Gorman built and designed his own house in the suburb of Pedregal, which was part built structure part natural cave, which is known as "The Cave House" from 1953 to 1956. It was decorated with mosaics throughout. Due to financial reasons O'Gorman sold the house to the Mexican sculptor Helen Escobedo in 1969, with the promise that the house would be preserved in its original state. However the house was partially demolished and modified, later transformed into a music school without a clear preservation plan for O'Gorman's architectural legacy.

His paintings often treated Mexican history, landscape, and legends. A mural commission in Pátzcuaro, Michoacan resulted in the huge "La historia de Michoacán" in the Biblioteca Pública Gertrudis Bocanegra in a former church. He painted the murals in the Independence Room in Mexico City's Chapultepec Castle, and the huge murals of his own 1952 Central Library of the National Autonomous University of Mexico, designed with Gustavo Saavedra and Juan Martínez de Velasco.

In 1959, together with fellow artists, Raúl Anguiano, Jesús Guerrero Galván, and Carlos Orozco Romero, O'Gorman founded the militant Unión de Pintores y Grabadores de México (Mexican Painters and Engravers Union).

== Death ==
O'Gorman was found dead at his home of suicide at age 76, on 18 January 1982. Authorities believe the artist grew despondent after being diagnosed with a heart ailment which curtailed his work.

== Awards ==
- National Prize for Arts and Sciences of "fine arts", 1972.

== Bibliography ==
- Burian, Edward R. (1997). "The Architecture of Juan O'Gorman: Dichotomy and Drift". Modernity and the Architecture of Mexico. Austin, Texas: University of Texas Press. ISBN 0-292-70852-1.
- Burian, Edward R. (2005). "Modernity and Nationalism: Juan O'Gorman and Post-Revolutionary Architecture in Mexico, 1920-1960". In LeJeune, Jean-François (ed.). Cruelty & Utopia: Cities and Landscapes of Latin America. New York: Princeton Architectural Press. pp. 210–223. ISBN 1-56898-489-8.
- O'Gorman, Juan. Juan O'Gorman. Inv. y coord. documental Ida Rodríguez Prampolini, Olga Sáenz y Elizabeth Fuentes. México: UNAM-Coordinación de Humanidades.
- O'Gorman. México: Grupo Financiero Bital. 1999.
- Prampolini, Ida Rodríguez (1983). Juan O'Gorman, arquitecto y pintor. México: UNAM-Instituto de Investigaciones Estéticas.
- Frasier, Valerie (2000). Building the New World: Modern Architecture in Latin America. Verso. ISBN 1-85984-787-0.

== See also ==
- Mexican Muralism
- Modernist architecture in Mexico
