= Cecil Crawford O'Gorman =

Irish-Mexican mining engineer, chemist and painter

- Born: Cecil Carleton Crawford O'Gorman; 6 April 1873; Shipston-on-Stour, Warwickshire. England
- Died: 3 November 1943 (aged 70); Mexico City
- Citizenship: British Subject (renounced), Mexico
- Spouse: Encarnación O'Gorman Moreno (1873–1944)

Cecil Crawford O'Gorman (1874 – 1943) was an English-born Irish-Mexican mining engineer, chemist and painter.

== Life ==
Cecil Crawford O'Gorman was born in Shipston-on-Stour, Warwickshire. He was the son of Edmund Anthony Gorman (1821-1912) and his third wife Margaret Eliza Barclay Crawford (1849-1899), his family was of Irish and English origins. O'Gorman studied engineering in Dublin.

O'Gorman moved to Mexico to work for a British mining company in 1895. Following ill-health from working in mining areas, O'Gorman became a chemist. He decided to stay since he knew his maternal family had been living in Mexico for several years, then he met and married his distant cousin in Mexico, Encarnación O'Gorman. She was the daughter of John (Juan) O'Gorman, and the grand-daughter of Charles O'Gorman, the first British consul to Mexico in 1835. They had four children, architect Juan, historian Edmundo, Margarita, and Tomás.

In his 1973 autobiography, his son Juan recounted the family's experience of the Mexican revolution and the bravery and piety of O'Gorman in protecting his family.

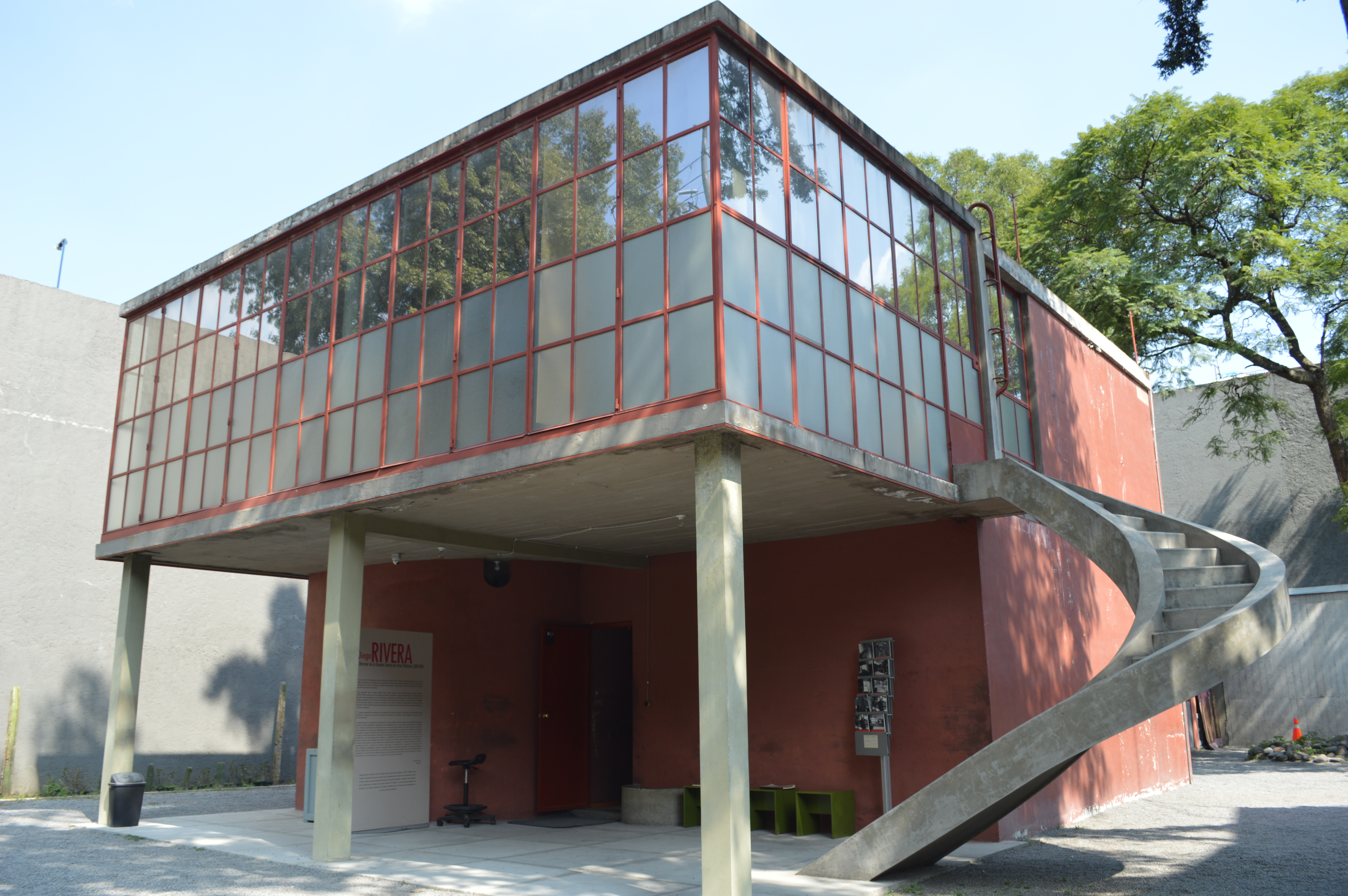
Cecil O'Gorman House

He commissioned his son Juan to design and build a house for him and his wife in 1928, which would become the first modernist house in Mexico. The house, known as the "Cecil O'Gorman House", is in San Ángel Colonia and is beside the Rivera-Kahlo house which was completed in 1932. In 2012, the National Institute of Fine Arts purchased the house.

O'Gorman attended classes given by Saturnino Herrán and travelled to France to improve his painting. He was among the circle of painters who were central to the "Mexican Renaissance" such as Alfonso Michel, Manuel González Serrano, and Emilio Baz Viaud. He became well known for his portraiture, landscapes, and murals. His work is seen as conventional and representational. A retrospective exhibition was held at Palacio de Bellas Artes after he died in 1943.

== Bibliography ==
- Helen Delpar, The Enormous Vogue of Things Mexican Cultural Relations Between the United States and Mexico, 1920-1935, 1992, p.126
- Kathryn E. O'Rourke, Modern Architecture in Mexico City History, Representation, and the Shaping of a Capital, 2017
