= José Santiago Healy Brennan =

- Born: José Santiago Healy Brennan; December 16, 1895; Monterrey, Nuevo León, México
- Died: October 7, 1968 (aged 72); Hermosillo, Sonora, México
- Education: Escuela hogar de Niños Trabajadores, Elemental No. 51.
- Occupation: Journalist
- Years active: 1909–1968
- Works: "Healy. Una historia de periodismo/ A History of Journalisim
- Spouse: Laura Noriega de Healy

José Santiago Healy Brennan (16 December 1895 – 7 October 1968) was a business person, revolutionary, journalist, columnist and contributor to various Mexican newspapers. During his political exile in 1924, he founded the newspaper ECO de México in Los Angeles; and in 1942 he acquired and modernized the Sonoran newspaper known as El Imparcial and El Regional de Hermosillo.

He participated actively in the creation of the Universidad de Sonora.

A number of schools, foundations, streets and avenues bear his name.

== Biographical summary ==
Healy Brennan was born in Monterrey, Nuevo León on the 16 December 1895. He was the youngest son of María Brennan and James Healy, a professor of mathematics and languages in the University of Dublín.

The couple, of Irish origin, emigrated from County Kilkenny to the city of Boston, United States in 1882, settling first in the state of Texas where two of their siblings were born: Elisa and Daniel. Later, in Monterrey, Mexico, Nicolás, Patricio and José Santiago were born.

=== Birth and childhood ===
He received his first years of teaching in his hometown in a small school run by his father.

In 1903, when he was seven years old, the family moved to Mexico City where he began his studies at the Home School for Working Children and at Elementary No. 51.

=== Beginnings ===
Subsequently, due to lack of financial resources, his primary studies were interrupted.

Forced to collaborate with the family economy, in 1909 José Healy, still a teenager and encouraged by his brother Patricio to work in the journalistic field; He begins his work in the Mexican newspaper El combate: Órgano de la Revolución Maderista. Place where both brothers knew and faced the civil war that engulfed the country and which, fortuitously, would begin their careers as journalists in November 1910.

In 1914, José Healy, at the age of 19, joined the revolutionary rebel forces led by the then leader Venustiano Carranza where he made friends with Adolfo de la Huerta who was governor of Sonora and president of Mexico in 1920, fighting as a soldier against Victoriano Huerta's forces in Veracruz.

He worked as a reporter during the campaign against the zapatistas forces in Morelos.

In 1916, with a group of journalists, among them: Froylán Manjarrez, Carlos Genda, Juan Robles, Aurelio Gallardo and Armando Romano, invited by the then governor Adolfo de la Huerta, he arrived in the State of Sonora to found newspapers in different cities with the objective to spread new revolutionary ideas to the country. That a year later they would be included in the Constitution of Mexico.

In Hermosillo, he edited the newspaper Reforma Social, which later changed its name to Orientación and in 1921 became known as "El Sol".

=== Exile ===
In 1924, due to the failed revolution, when the schism occurred between Álvaro Obregón and Plutarco Elías Calles on the one hand and De la Huerta on the other; Healy accompanied his friend Adolfo de la Huerta and filmmaker Emilio Fernández Romo into exile in the United States, as well as others who followed the rebellion against Obregón, where he lived for a period of 8 years. Later, he married Laura Noriega from Sonora.

During his stay in Los Angeles, he founded the newspaper El ECO de México: Diario de los mexicanos en Estados Unidos until 1932, on which date, he was invited by Governor Rodolfo Elías Calles to work in the capital of Sonora, Hermosillo, where he edited the newspaper El Tiempo de Sonora. That disappeared when the political conflict between Plutarco Elías Calles and President Lázaro Cárdenas occurred, three years later.

=== Return to Mexico ===
In 1937, the journalist José Abraham Mendívil started the newspaper El Imparcial with the legend "Diario Gráfico de la Mañana."

Five years later, it is sold to Healy; who acquires the newspaper, modernizing its structure and replacing the legend of "Diario Grafico de la Mañana" with "Diario Independiente de Sonora".Because it was not registered as a new newspaper, to date, El Imparcial is the oldest and most established newspaper in the State of Sonora.

Being a participant in modernization in the Sonoran community, from 1938 to 1942, Mr. Healy Brennan participated intensely in the creation and establishment of the Universidad de Sonora.

In subsequent years, he continued in journalism and in 1955 founded the newspaper El Regional, which has now disappeared.

=== Personal life and later years ===
Healy Brennan remembered with nostalgia Leandro Valle Street and the years they lived in Mexico City, which came to an end with the death of her 20-year-old brother Nicolás.

The closeness to Father Agustín Hunt Cortés and his colleagues in the newspaper El Combate, as well as the death of his older brother, made him influenced by the revolutionary era; One autumn morning in 1914, he left his family and studies to board a train heading to Veracruz, where he became the first captain of the revolution.

Years later, during his exile, he was arrested in the summer of 1926 along with sixteen other people on charges of plotting an armed rebellion to overthrow the Government of Mexico from the territory of the United States, according to a copy of the District Court document. Southern California located in National Archives Pacific Southwest Region No.8054H.

Lover of raising birds and a long life of struggle, exile, success and work, José Santiago Healy Brennan, died on October 7, 1968, during a family visit in Los Angeles, California. He was buried in the popularly known "Yáñez pantheon" in Hermosillo.

He is remembered for having actively participated in the creation of the Universidad de Sonora. And the formation of several institutions such as the State General Hospital, the nursing home and recreation spaces such as sports units that today bear his name.

He had three children, María Laura, José Alberto and Dolores, who died as a child; He also had numerous grandchildren, among them, the renowned businessmen Juan Fernando Healy Loera and Luis Alberto Healy Loera, as well as José Santiago Healy Loera, who, after his father, José Añberto Healy Noriega, became the successors of the well-known newspaper El Imparcial.

Since January 22, 1982, one of the most important streets in the city of Hermosillo was named in his honor and in 1992 the Healy Foundation began operations with the objective of "contributing to comprehensive development, through the generation of cultural opportunities, educational and sports, aimed at people with a desire to improve in the Northwest of Mexico.

== Awards and recognitions ==
- In 1959, the Hermosillo community, represented by the Rotary International to which he belonged since its founding, rewarded his work by giving him recognition for his 50 years of active journalism.
- By agreement of the Hermosillo Lobby, on January 22, 1982, his name was imposed on the old Nogales street.
- Member of the administrative committee Pro-foundation of the Universidad de Sonora
- Member of the board and council of the Husbands Rodríguez Foundation.
- Member of the Sports Committee of Sonora and the Patriotic Board of Hermosillo.
- Founder and first president of the Association of Writers and Journalists of Sonora.
- Founder and administrative director of the company Impressiona y Editorial SA; published by El Imparcial.

== Bibliography ==
- Periódicos Healy, Murillo Chisem, Jorge. Healy. Una historia de periodismo. Primera Edición, 2014. Edited by Emilio Robles Burgos and Lourdes Lugo Zazueta
