= Edmée Pardo Murray =

Mexican writer and narrator (born 1965)

Edmée Pardo Murray (born 5 July 1965) is a Mexican writer and narrator.

Murray was born in Mexico City in 1965. After graduating with a degree in sociology from National Autonomous University of Mexico, she attended Pacifica Graduate Institute in Santa Barbara, California, US. She received further degrees from SOGEM and Instituto Tecnológico Autónomo de México. Murray founded and served as editor of Ediciones Bruges. Her work has been included in several Latin American anthologies.

== Selected works ==
=== Stories ===
- Las plegarias de mi boca, 2005
- Flor de un solo día, 2002
- Rondas de cama y la madera de las cosas, 1999
- Loteria, 1995
- Pasajes, 1993

=== Novels ===
- La voz azul, 2008
- Morir de amor, 2002
- El sueño de los gatos, 1998
- El primo Javier, 1996
- Espiral, 1994

=== Children's literature ===
- Enfermedad de escribe con c, 2009
- El brasier de mamá, 2013
- Ese monstruo tiene mi cara, 2014
- Las tres reglas que cambiaron todo, 2014
- Las grandes Ligas, 2015
