= Edmundo O'Gorman =

Mexican writer, historian and philosopher (1906–1995)

Edmundo O'Gorman (24 November 1906 in Mexico City – 28 September 1995 in Mexico City) was a Mexican writer, historian and philosopher. He is considered as being among the earlier and most influential applicants of historical revisionism to commonly held narratives regarding the Spanish colonial period in Latin America.

== Early life and education ==
O'Gorman was born in Coyoacán, in the then southern part of Mexico City. He was the son of Cecil Crawford O'Gorman, an Irishman who moved to Mexico in 1895. His mother was descendant of the first British consul in Mexico City, Charles O'Gorman, who later married a Mexican citizen. His family was of Irish, Spanish and English origins. He was the younger brother of celebrated architect and painter Juan O'Gorman.

He graduated with a degree in Law (1928) from the Escuela Libre de Derecho. In 1940 he began lecturing in the Philosophy faculty of Mexico City College. In 1948 he obtained a Masters in Philosophy and in 1951 he completed his doctorate in History with summa cum laude honorific distinction from the National Autonomous University of Mexico (UNAM). While at UNAM, he was at the university's Faculty of Philosophy and Letters, and a researcher at the university's Institute of Historical Research. During his time at UNAM, O'Gorman met and developed relationships with distinguished Mexican intellectuals and Spanish refugees, such as José Gaos, who would greatly influence his later works.

O'Gorman also lectured at the Universidad Iberoamericana.

== Career ==
Between 1938 and 1952, O'Gorman worked for the Mexican General National Archive. He became a member of the Mexican Academy of the Spanish Language in 1969 and the Mexican Academy of the Corresponding History of the Real of Madrid, corporation of which he was a director from 1972 to 1987.

He resigned after disagreements over concepts such as the "discovery of America", "encounter between two worlds", "cultural fusion" (or "natural mixing"), names he rejected and instead preferred the terms "empowerment", "domination" and others more according with a critical interrogation of history.

O'Gorman was the author of several historical texts that were published between 1951 and 1986. O'Gorman published his first works and studies in the "Alcancía" along with his close friend Justino Fernández.

He was a great admirer of authors such as José Ortega y Gasset, Wilhelm Dilthey, Benedetto Croce, Martin Heidegger, among other historical and philosophical writers. These influences bolstered O’Gorman’s disagreement with previous Mexican historiography, which was full of extremism and with a leaning towards new, unedited documents.

== Achievements ==
- Premio Nacional de Letras in (1974)
- Premio Historia Rafael Heliodoro Valle (1983)
- Premio UNAM a la Docencia (1986).
- Member of the Academia Mexicana de la Historia (1964).
- Member of the Academia Mexicana de la Lengua (1969).
- Received honoris causa Ph. Ds at the Universidad Nacional Autónoma de México y de la Universidad Iberoamericana.
- Emeritus professor of the Sistema Nacional de Investigadores and the UNAM y member of the Junta de Gobierno.
- Led the Academia Mexicana de la Historia (1972–1987).

== Books ==
- Destierro de Sombras (1986)
- La incógnita de la llamada "Historia de los indios de la Nueva España", atribuida a Fray Toribio Motolinia (1982)
- México el trauma de su historia (1977)
- Guías de las actas del cabildo de la ciudad de México. Siglo XVI (1970)
- 50 años de revolución (1962)
- La supervivencia política novohispana (1961)
- Invención de América (1958)
- Coautor de Precedentes y sentido de la revolución de Ayutla (1954)
- Fundamentos de la historia de América (1951)
- Dos concepciones de la tarea histórica (1951)
