= Bannerman (surname) =

Bannerman is a Scottish occupational surname for flag/standard bearers, first held by Clan Bannerman. Notable people with the surname include:

- Alexander Bannerman (1788–1864), British colonial governor
- Alick Bannerman (1854–1924), Australian Test cricketer
- Anne Bannerman (1765–1829), Scottish poet
- Bannerman baronets
  - Sir Alexander Bannerman, 6th Baronet (1741–1813), British doctor and professor
  - Sir Alexander Bannerman, 9th Baronet (1823–1877), Scottish diplomat
  - Sir Alexander Bannerman, 11th Baronet (1871–1934), British major and aviator
  - Sir Arthur Bannerman, 12th Baronet (1866–1955), British colonel, colonial administrator and courtier
- Casey Bannerman (born 1987), Canadian artist
- Cecilia Bannerman, Ghanaian politician
- Celia Bannerman (born 1944), English actress
- Charles Bannerman (1851–1930), Australian cricketer, scorer of a century in the first Test match
- Christopher Bannerman, Canadian-born British academic, choreographer and dancer
- David Armitage Bannerman (1886–1979), British ornithologist
- David Bannerman, South African bishop
- David Campbell Bannerman (born 1960), British politician
- Edmund Bannerman (1832–1903), journalist, newspaper proprietor and lawyer in the British colony of the Gold Coast; third son of James Bannerman
- Edward Bannerman (1850–1923), Scottish cricketer and rugby player
- Frances Bannerman (1855–1944), Canadian painter and poet
- Francis Bannerman VI (1851–1918), Irish-American Businessman, built Bannerman's Castle on Pollepel Island
- Gary Bannerman (1947–2011), Scottish journalist
- Harry Bannerman (born 1942), Scottish golfer
- Helen Bannerman (1862–1946), British writer, author of Little Black Sambo
- Henry Satorius Bannerman (born 1918), Ghanaian doctor and politician
- Hugh Bannerman (1887–1917), New Zealand cricketer, journalist and soldier
- Ian Bannerman, Australian actor who portrayed Deadly Earnest on TEN-10 from 1966 to 1970
- Isabel Bannerman (born 1962), British designer
- Isabella Bannerman (born 1961), American cartoonist
- James Bannerman (1790–1858), Fanti Governor of the Gold Coast, the son of a Fanti woman and a Scotsman
- James Bannerman (1807–1868), Free Church of Scotland theologian
- John Alexander Bannerman (1759–1819), British colonial administrator
- John Bannerman, Baron Bannerman of Kildonan (1901–1969), Scottish rugby player, politician and farmer
- John Bannerman (1932–2008), Scottish historian
- Joseph Bannerman (1850–1932), Canadian politician
- Julian Bannerman (born 1951), British architect
- Kay Bannerman (1919–1991), British actress and screenwriter
- Manon Bannerman (born 2002), Swiss singer
- Marc Bannerman (born 1973), British actor
- Margaret Bannerman (1896–1976), Canadian actress
- Max Bannerman (born 1997), Scottish politician
- Murray Bannerman (born 1957), Canadian ice-hockey goaltender
- Ronald Bannerman (1890–1978), New Zealand flying ace of World War I
- Sara Bannerman, Canadian academic
- Scott Bannerman (born 1979), Scottish footballer
- William Bannerman (1841–1914), Canadian politician
- William Bannerman (1822–1902), New Zealand missionary
- Major General William Burney Bannerman (1858–1924), Scottish military surgeon
- Yasmin Bannerman (born 1972), British actress
- Manon Bannerman (born 2002), Swiss singer, member of KATSEYE

== See also ==
- Henry Campbell-Bannerman
- Campbell-Bannerman (surname)
