= Alexander Bannerman (disambiguation) =

Alexander Bannerman (1788–1864) was a British merchant and MP for Aberdeen.

Alexander Bannerman may also refer to:

- Alexander Bannerman (engraver) (fl. 1766), English engraver
- Alexander Bannerman (cricketer) (1854–1924), Australian cricketer
- Sir Alexander Bannerman, 1st Baronet (died 1711), of the Bannerman baronets
- Sir Alexander Bannerman, 2nd Baronet (died 1742), of the Bannerman baronets
- Sir Alexander Bannerman, 3rd Baronet (died 1747), of the Bannerman baronets
- Sir Alexander Bannerman, 4th Baronet (died 1770), of the Bannerman baronets
- Sir Alexander Bannerman, 6th Baronet (1741–1813), Scottish professor of Medicine
- Sir Alexander Bannerman, 7th Baronet (1769–1840) of the Bannerman baronets
- Sir Alexander Bannerman, 9th Baronet (1823–1877), Scottish diplomat
- Sir Alexander Bannerman, 11th Baronet (1871–1934), British military aviator
- Sir Alexander Bannerman, 14th Baronet (1933–1989) of the Bannerman baronets
