= David Bannerman =

David Bannerman may refer to:

- David Armitage Bannerman (1886–1979), British ornithologist
- David Campbell Bannerman (born 1960), British politician
- David Bannerman (bishop), South African Anglican bishop
- Sir David Bannerman, 15th Baronet (born 1935), of the Bannerman baronets

== See also ==
- Bannerman (disambiguation)
- Clan Bannerman
