= Bannerman =

Bannerman is a name of Scottish origin (see Clan Bannerman) and may refer to:

== Places ==
Canada

- Bannerman, Edmonton, a neighbourhood in Edmonton, Canada

United Kingdom

- Bannermans, a rock and whisky bar in Edinburgh

United States

- Bannerman, Wisconsin, an unincorporated community
- Bannerman's Castle, an abandoned arms depot on the Hudson River in New York

== Other uses ==
- The carrier of a military unit's colours, standards and guidons, or other banners (standard-bearer)
- Bannerman (surname)
- Bannerman, a loose translation of hatamoto, a direct vassal of the Tokugawa shogunate in Japan
- A man who belonged to the Eight Banners of the Qing Dynasty
- An alternative name of Manchu people
- The surname of some key characters in the Stephen King novel The Dead Zone and related works
- The Banner Man, a 1971 single by Blue Mink, charting at #3 in the United Kingdom
- Bannerman, a track on Squint (album), by Steve Taylor
- Bannermen, the main antagonists in the 1987 Doctor Who episode "Delta and the Bannermen".

== See also ==
- Clan Bannerman
- Bannerman baronets
- Bannerman Clarke
- Pollepel Island (also Bannerman Island), site of Bannerman's Castle
- Delta and the Bannermen
