= 1872 Aberdeen by-election =

British parliamentary by-election

The 1872 Aberdeen by-election was fought on 29 June 1872. The by-election occurred as a result of the death of the incumbent Liberal MP, William Henry Sykes. It was won by the "Moderate Liberal" candidate John Farley Leith against the official Liberal candidate James William Barclay, whose reputation as a Radical led to a split in the local party

By-election, 29 June 1872: Aberdeen
Party	Candidate	Votes	%	±%
Liberal	John Farley Leith	4,392	57.0	N/A
Liberal	James William Barclay	2,615	33.9	N/A
Conservative	James Shaw	704	9.1	New
Majority		1,777	23.1	N/A
Turnout		7,711	55.1	N/A
Registered electors		13,996		
Liberal hold				
