= William Bannerman =

William Bannerman may refer to:

- William Bannerman (politician) (1841–1914), Scottish-born Canadian politician
- William Bannerman (minister) (1822–1902), Presbyterian minister in Otago, New Zealand
- William Burney Bannerman (1858–1924), Scottish military surgeon
