= Alexander Fordyce (politician) =

Scottish naval officer and politician (1800–1864)

Member of Parliament for Aberdeen
- In office 3 August 1847 – 10 July 1852
- Preceded by: Alexander Bannerman
- Succeeded by: George Thompson

Personal details
- Born: 4 March 1800 Aberdeen, Scotland
- Died: 16 July 1864 (aged 64)
- Party: Whig

Alexander Dingwall Fordyce of Culsh and Brucklay (4 March 1800 – 16 July 1864) was a British naval officer and Whig politician.

== Life ==
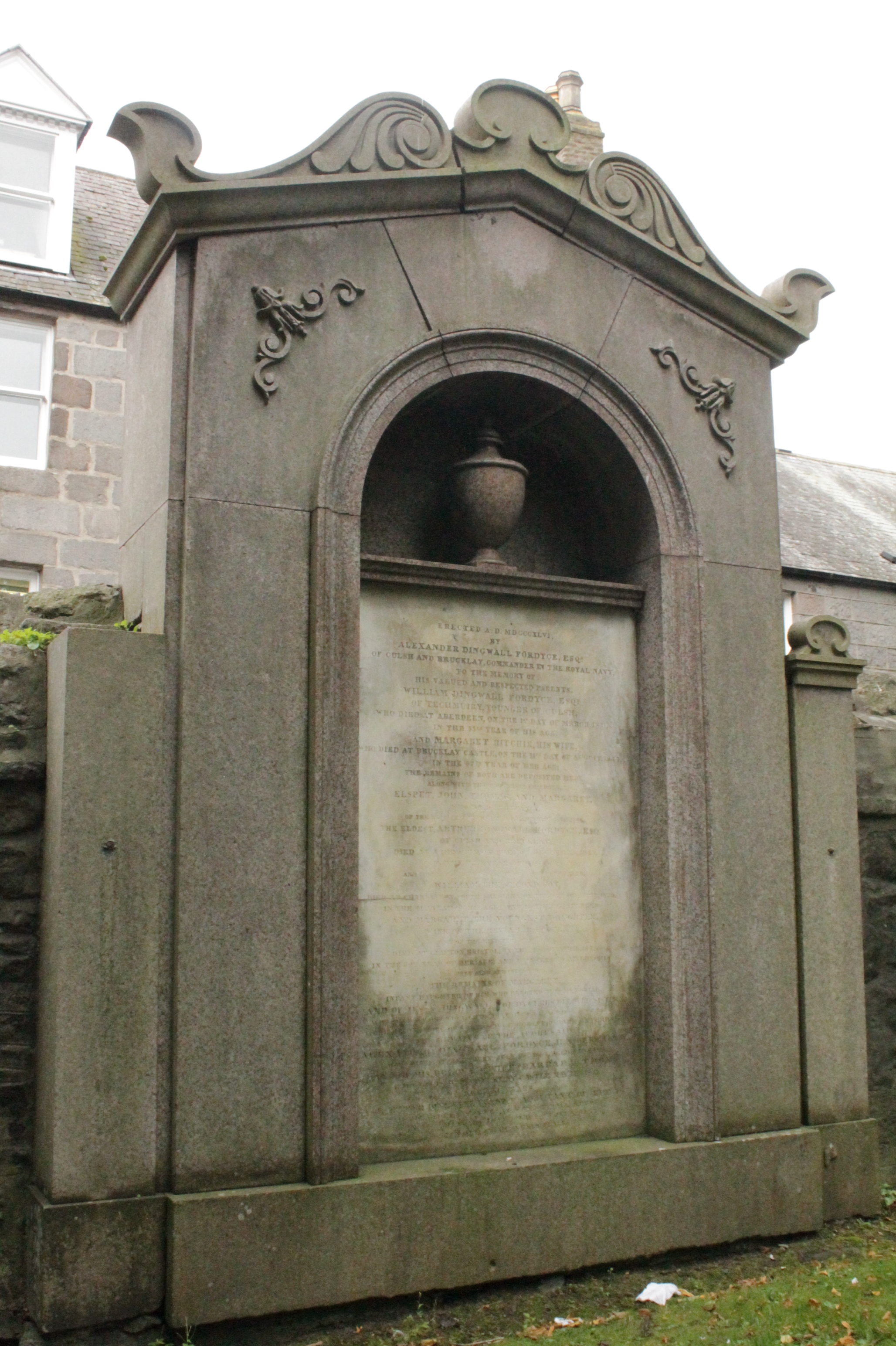
The grave of Alexander Dingwall Fordyce, St Nicholas Churchyard, Aberdeen

He was born in Aberdeen the son of William Dingwall Fordyce of Techmuiry and Culsh, and his wife, Margaret Ritchie.

At the age of 13, Fordyce entered the navy as a volunteer on board the Désirée where he was commanded by his relative, Captain Arthur Farquhar, and was actively employed at the blockade of the German rivers, and at the reduction of Cuxhaven in December 1813 and Glückstadt in January 1814. After this, he followed Farquhar on board the Liverpool, serving on this ship from 1814 to 1816, and becoming involved in the blockade of Île Bourbon. Upon his return to England, he is believed to have been almost lost off Dover, with the frigate having taken ground at the foot of Shakespeare's Cliff, only freed when masts and spars were cut away, and guns, provisions and stores were thrown overboard.

In April 1816, he became one of the first to pass the examination for navigation at the Royal Naval College, and just four months later was serving at the bombardment of Algiers on board the Albion, captained by John Coode. Aboard this ship, as well as the Rochfort and the Revenge, he was employed in the Mediterranean Sea, serving under Sir Charles Penrose, Sir Thomas Fremantle, Sir Graham Moore, and Harry Burrard-Neale.

In January 1826, he was appointed acting-lieutenant of the Weazel, captained by Richard Beaumont, having passed his examination for seamanship just five and a half years previous. In May of the same year, he was confirmed to the vessel, and was then employed for many months in the Ionian Islands to protect British commerce during the Greek War of Independence.

He returned to England in March 1827, and then officiated as first-lieutenant from May 1829 to June 1833 aboard the Algerine, captained by Charles Talbot and John Frederick Fitzgerald De Roos. During this period, he recovered the remnants of treasure which had been lost at Cape Frio aboard the Thetis, and received the thanks of the Commander-in-Chief. Upon leaving the ship, he was presented by his captain with a "handsome sword, bearing an appropriate inscription" as well as a silver snuff-box from the warrant officers, seamen, and marines "in grateful acknowledgement of his unwearied efforts to promote their happiness and comfort during a period of four years' service".

From January 1839 to March 1841, he served on the Cleopatra, captained by Stephen Lushington on the Brazilian and North America & West India stations, and for some time by himself. In September 1841, he became a commander, and moved to half-pay. In 1837, in the period between the Algerine and Cleopatra, he published one title: Outlines of Naval Routine.

== Political career ==
He was elected Whig MP for Aberdeen at the 1847 general election and held the seat until 1852 when he did not seek re-election.

He lived at Albyn Place in Aberdeen but also owned property including Brucklay Castle.

He died on 16 July 1864 and is buried with his patents in the churchyard of the Kirk of St Nicholas in Aberdeen. The large tomb stands on the west wall.

Parliament of the United Kingdom
| Preceded by Alexander Bannerman | Member of Parliament for Aberdeen; 1847–1852 | Succeeded by George Thompson |
