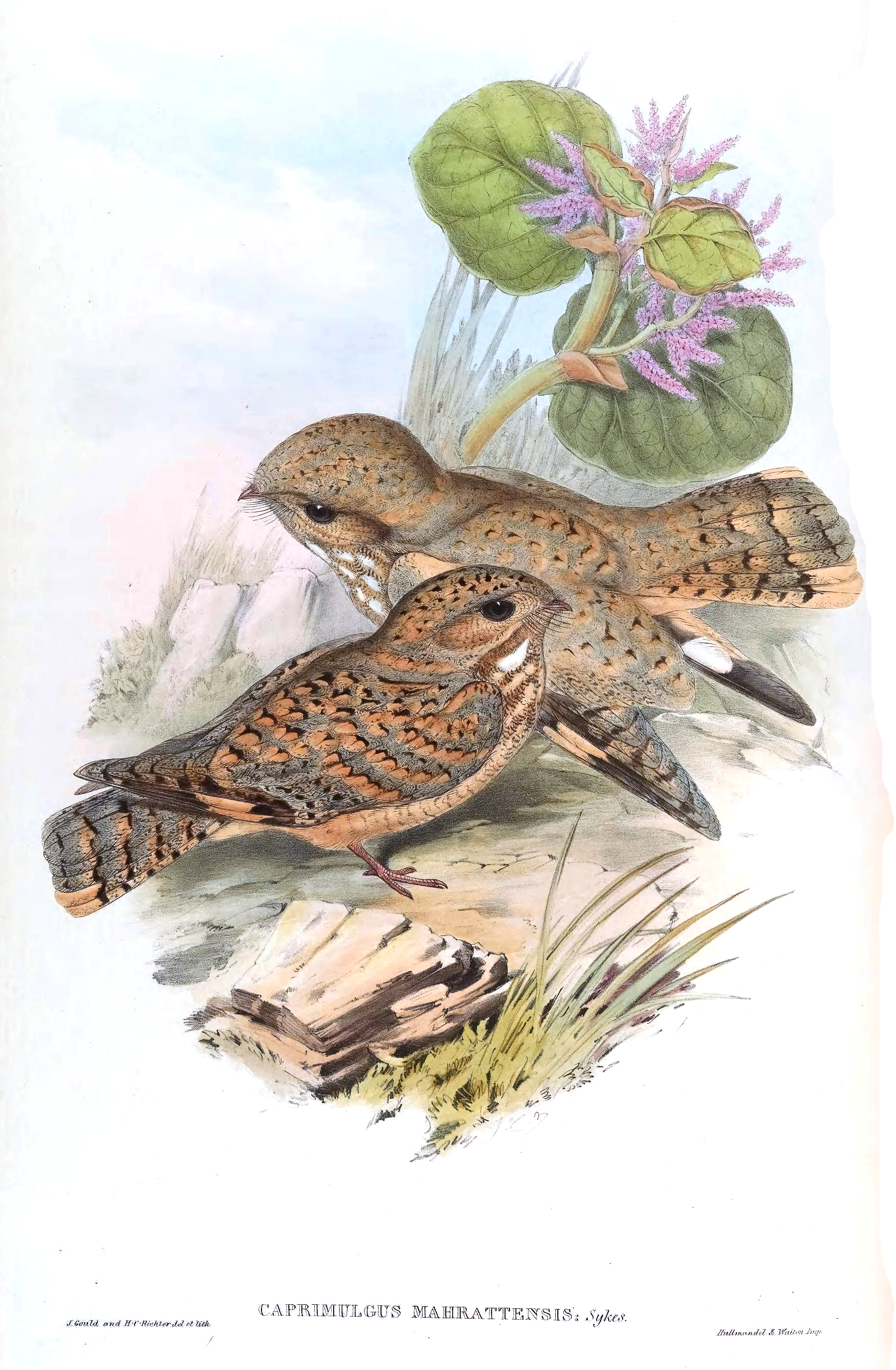

Conservation status
- Least Concern (IUCN 3.1)

Scientific classification
- Kingdom: Animalia
- Phylum: Chordata
- Class: Aves
- Clade: Strisores
- Order: Caprimulgiformes
- Family: Caprimulgidae
- Genus: Caprimulgus
- Species: C. mahrattensis

Binomial name
- Caprimulgus mahrattensis Sykes, 1832

= Sykes's nightjar =

Species of bird

The Sykes's nightjar, Sykes' nightjar, Sind nightjar or Sindh nightjar (Caprimulgus mahrattensis) is a nightjar species found in northwestern South Asia. This species has a large range with stable population size and therefore has been listed as "Least Concern" with no prediction of substantial human influence on their habitats in the near future.

== Description ==
The Sykes's nightjar is a relatively small bird, measuring around 20-25 centimeters in length and weighing about 60 grams. They have a short bill, and dark blackish brown irises. The Sykes's nightjar's wings are long and narrow. The bird has a short, pale-gray bill with bristles around the mouth. They have small feet, only useful for perching and not effective at walking.

Their plumage is mainly of brown and grey color, with upperparts having sandy coloration with blackish brown and pale brown spots all over their body, making their plumage resemble tree bark, leaf litter, or sandy ground, allowing them to camouflage with their environment, known as cryptic plumage. The Sykes's nightjar has a nuchal collar (nape) of buffish color with irregular buff spotting, along with a blackish-brown crown, whitish submoustachial stripe, and a large white patch on either side of their lower throat, sometimes extending across the entire throat. Their wing coverts are sandy grey with blackish brown streaks and vermiculation, along with buff spots, and their scapular contains blackish spots and cinnamon markings. They have a white band towards the wing tip of their three outermost primaries and broad white tips on their two outermost tail feathers. Their underparts are paler in color, being sandy-grey with buff spots and brown barring, becoming buff barred brown on their belly and flanks.

Both sexes of this species are similar with slight sexual dimorphism, both having the large white band on their three outermost primaries, but it is smaller in females and sometimes mixed with buff. The tips on their outermost tail feathers are also white for males while females' are buffish white. Immature and juvenile birds are paler in color and plainer than adults.

== Taxonomy ==
The Sykes's nightjar is a monotypic species which belongs to the family of nightjars, Caprimulgidae. The name commemorates Colonel William Henry Sykes, an English naturalist and ornithologist who served with the British military in India. This species is closely related to the Jungle nightjar (Caprimulgus indicus) and the European nightjar (Caprimulgus europaeus) but is mainly confused with the Egyptian nightjar (Caprimulgus aegyptius) and looks similar to the Vaurie's nightjar (Caprimulgus centralasicus). In comparison to the European nightjar, Sykes's nightjar is plainer and sandier, with spots rather than streaks on their crown, largely unfeathered tarsi, and have different calls which carry less far with notes that don't have changes in pitch. The two species' breeding ranges overlap but they are unlikely to be found together during the breeding season. The Sykes's nightjar differs from the Egyptian nightjar in their size and their wing and tail patterns. They are smaller than the Egyptian nightjar, which has white underwings but lacks white upper wing bands and tail spots. A similar difference is observed when comparing Sykes's nightjar to Vaurie's nightjar, which is very similar in overall coloration, but lacks the white band near the wing tip of the outer wings. Sykes's nightjar has also been observed to have similar to slightly shorter wing length compared to Vaurie's nightjar.

== Distribution and habitat ==
=== Distribution ===
The Sykes's nightjar is mainly found in the Indian subcontinent, predominantly in the countries of India, Nepal, Bhutan, Bangladesh, and Sri Lanka. Their distribution also includes Pakistan, Afghanistan, and Iran, with vagrant birds recorded in United Arab Emirates and Oman. The species is partially migratory, wintering in western and central India, visiting south-western Afghanistan in the summer, and breeding in Afghanistan, Pakistan, Iran, and India. The Sykes's nightjar is considered a resident species in Pakistan, south-eastern Iran, Sri Lanka.

=== Habitat ===
The Sykes's nightjar inhabits various ecosystems with dry open areas containing trees and bushes. The species has low forest dependence and is mainly found in semi-deserts with scattered thorn scrub, also inhabiting open woodlands, subtropical grasslands, forest edges, dry stony scrubland, and many other habitats. They usually avoid cultivated or irrigated areas but thrive in a variety of other habitats due to their adaptability and they are generally found in elevations from sea level (0 meters) to 500 meters.

== Behaviour ==
Sykes's nightjar is active mostly in the late evening, early morning and at night. They are very agile and buoyant when foraging, flying low to the ground over open terrain.

=== Diet ===
The Sykes's nightjar feed primarily on large flying insects which are abundant during the night, such as moths, beetles, grasshoppers, locusts, crickets, cicadas, and other nocturnal insects. These insects are caught by the bird during flight, where they are scooped up by the nightjar's wide bill.

=== Vocalizations ===
The territorial call/song of Sykes's nightjar consists of long series of hard, knocking notes rapidly repeated, producing a prolonged churr, also described as a low trilling sound or rattle, which is given in bouts lasting 1-2 seconds and 3-4 minutes. This song is performed by a male from the ground, mainly at dusk and dawn, carrying through 200-300 meters, with each individual note being roughly equal in pitch and rate. Other calls include a series of soft "chuk-chuk" or "cluk-cluk" notes when the bird is startled to fly and during display. During display flights, males also produce mechanical wing-clapping sounds.

=== Reproduction ===
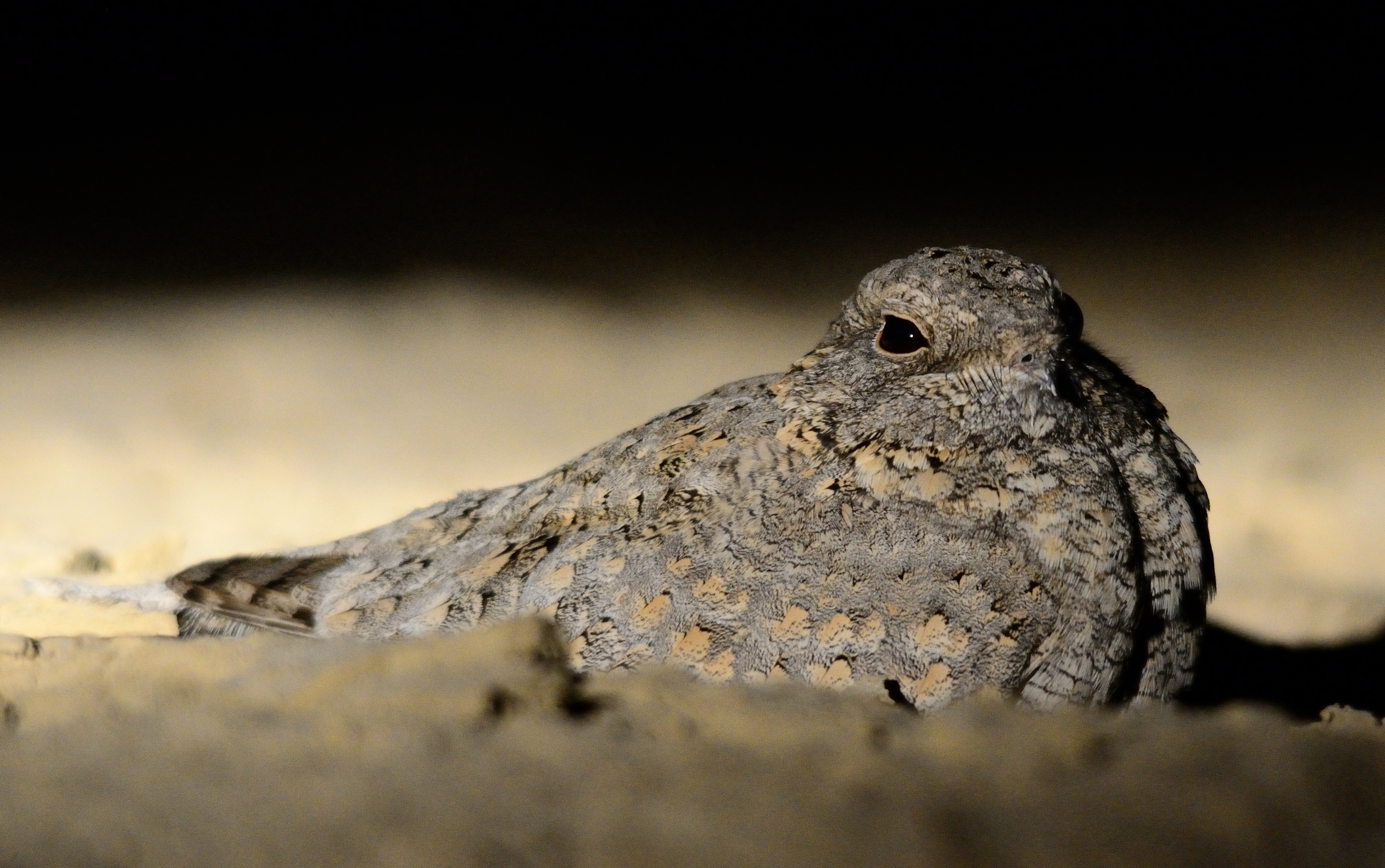
in Banni Grasslands

The breeding season for Sykes's nightjar usually begins in April and May, though it has been recorded as February to August in Pakistan, with a peak breeding period during March to May, and recorded as March to May in India. During the breeding season, the males establish territories and perform various courtship displays to attract a mate during the night, including aerial acrobatics, wing-clapping, and vocalizations. The female nightjars lay 1-2 eggs directly on the bare ground without a nest, sometimes among leaf litter or small rocks, at a nesting site in full sunlight or sheltered by grass or a small bush. These eggs have an elliptical shape, white or greyish white color, with grey or brownish grey smears and blotches, camouflaging them from potential predators.

The incubation period for the eggs lasts around 20-22 days and is usually done by the female but can also be done by both the male and the female taking turns. Once the eggs hatch, the parents share the duties of feeding and protecting the chicks, which are semi-precocial with grey color and black speckles. These chicks have the adapted behaviour to remain motionless on the ground and camouflage with their surroundings to avoid being detected by predators. The young nightjars become fully independent from their parents a few months after fledging and reach sexual maturity at around one year of age where they usually breed annually. Their lifespan (or generation length) has been recorded as 5.6 years.
