= Sir Alexander Bannerman, 6th Baronet =

Sir Alexander Bannerman, Bt
- Born: Alexander Bannerman; 22 December 1741; Scotland
- Died: 29 December 1813 (aged 72); Aberdeen, Scotland
- Other name: Alexander Burnett
- Occupations: Physician, professor
- Spouse: Mary Gordon (after 1768)
- Parent(s): Alexander Bannerman; Margaret Burnett
- Relatives: Anthony Keith-Falconer, 7th Earl of Kintore (grandson); Sir Alexander Bannerman, 9th Baronet (grandson)

Sir Alexander Bannerman, 6th Baronet (22 December 1741 – 29 December 1813) was a Scottish medical doctor and professor of medicine at the University of Aberdeen.

== Early life ==
Alexander was born in Scotland on 22 December 1741. He was the eldest son of Aberdeen merchant Alexander Bannerman (1715–1782) and Margaret (née Burnett) Bannerman (b. 1719). He was the brother of merchant Thomas Bannerman (father of colonial governor Sir Alexander Bannerman, MP and grandfather of Sir George Bannerman, 10th Baronet), Anne Bannerman (the wife of Alexander Garioch, Esq.) and advocate Charles Bannerman.

His mother, a great-granddaughter of Alexander Burnett, 1st Laird of Kirkhill, succeeded to the lands of Kirkhill. On 16 April 1777, his name was legally changed to Alexander Burnett. His paternal grandparents were Margaret (a daughter of Sir Charles Maitland, Bt of Pitrichies) and Sir Patrick Bannerman, a Provost of Aberdeen who was the second son of Sir Alexander Bannerman, who had been created a baronet in the Baronetage of Nova Scotia in 1682 by King Charles II on account of his "constant loyalty during the rebellion, and of the heavy calamities he had suffered on that account." His grandfather's elder brother, Sir Alexander Bannerman, 2nd Baronet, married Isabella Macdonald (a daughter of Sir Donald Macdonald of Sleat) and was the father of the 3rd Baronet (who raised a regiment that fought at the Battle of Culloden) and grandfather of the 4th and 5th Baronets (whom Sir Alexander succeeded in 1796).

== Career ==
A trained Doctor of Medicine, he worked as a professor of medicine at the University of Aberdeen in Scotland.

On 1 October 1796, his name was legally changed back to Alexander Bannerman upon his succession as the 6th Baronet Bannerman of Elsick. He succeeded his unmarried cousin, Sir Edward Bannerman, the younger brother of Sir Alexander Bannerman, 4th Baronet, who was forced to sell the Elsick estate for a nominal price on account of his father's and his alleged participation in the Jacobite rising of 1745.

== Personal life ==
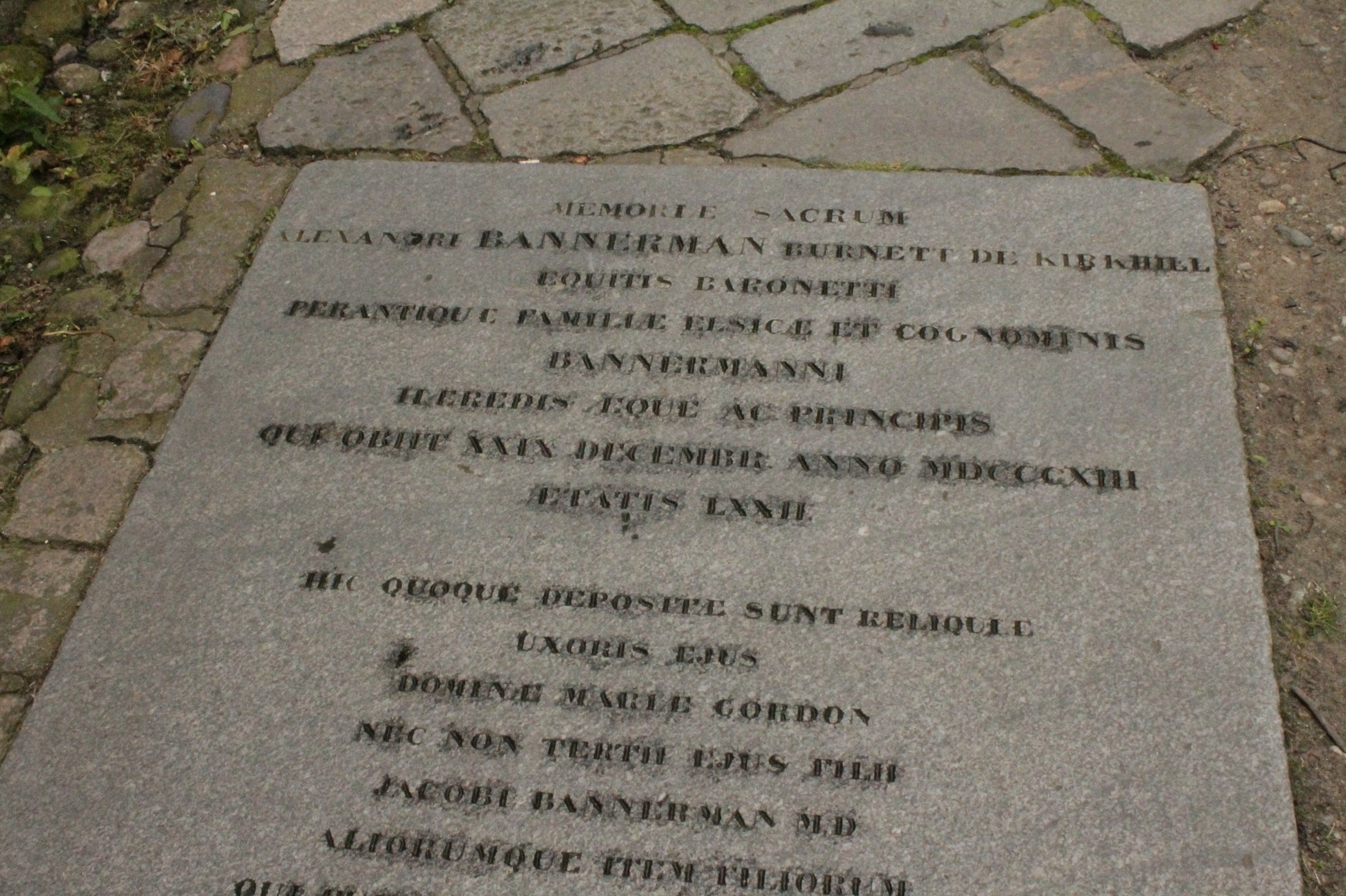
The grave of Sir Alexander Bannerman, 6th Baronet, Kirk of St Nicholas, Aberdeen

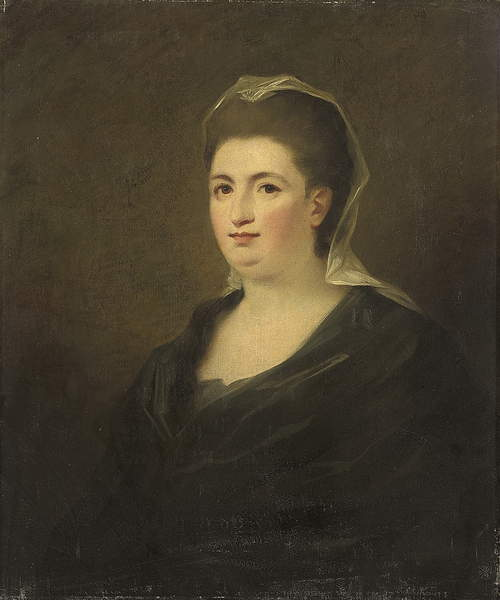
Portrait of his daughter Maria, Countess of Kintore by Henry Raeburn

On 25 January 1768, Alexander was married to Mary Gordon, daughter of James Gordon, 1st of Banchory and the former Mary Buchan. Together, they lived at Kirkhill in Aberdeenshire and were the parents of:

- Thomas Bannerman (1768–1813), who died unmarried in India.
- Sir Alexander Bannerman, 7th Baronet (1769–1840), who married Rachel Irvine, daughter of John Irvine, in 1800.
- Maria Bannerman (1771–1826), who married William Keith-Falconer, 6th Earl of Kintore in 1793.
- James Bannerman (1774–1838), who was also a physician and professor; he married Helen Burnett (1784–1864), a daughter of Alexander Burnett, Esq. of Kemnay.
- Sir Charles Bannerman, 8th Baronet (1782–1851), who married his cousin Anne Bannerman (d. 1838), a daughter of Charles Bannerman (the 6th Baronet's younger brother).
- Edward Bannerman, who died unmarried in India.
- Margaret Bannerman, who died unmarried.

Sir Alexander died in Aberdeen on 29 December 1813. He was buried in the churchyard of St. Nicholas in Aberdeen.

=== Descendants ===
Through his daughter Maria, he was a grandfather of Anthony Keith-Falconer, 7th Earl of Kintore (1794–1844), who married twice, had four children with his second wife, and several natural born children with his mistress.

Through his son Charles, he was a grandfather of the diplomat Sir Alexander Bannerman, 9th Baronet (1823–1877), who married Lady Arabella Diana Sackville-West, the youngest daughter of Lord Chamberlain George Sackville-West, 5th Earl De La Warr and Elizabeth Sackville-West, Countess De La Warr in 1860. After her death, he married Lady Katherine Ashburnham, daughter of Bertram Ashburnham, 4th Earl of Ashburnham and Lady Katherine Charlotte Baillie (a sister of George Baillie-Hamilton, 10th Earl of Haddington), in 1874. With his first wife, he was the father of Ethel Mary Elizabeth Bannerman (1868–1947), the wife of Charles Carnegie, 10th Earl of Southesk (a son of James Carnegie, 9th Earl of Southesk). Sir Alexander bought back part of the Elsick estate sold by the 4th Baronet. As he had no sons, the baronetcy passed to his extended cousin, George Bannerman (1827–1901), who was the grandson of the 6th Baronet's younger brother Thomas and the father of Sir Alexander Bannerman, 11th Baronet.

Baronetage of Nova Scotia
Preceded by Edward Trotter Bannerman	Baronet (of Elsick); 1796–1813	Succeeded by Alexander Bannerman
