= Air Battalion Royal Engineers =

Air Battalion
- Founded: 1 April 1911
- Country: UK
- Part of: Royal Engineers
- Headquarters: Farnborough Airfield

Commanders
- Commander: Sir Alexander Bannerman

The Air Battalion Royal Engineers (ABRE) was the first flying unit of the British Armed Forces to make use of heavier-than-air craft. Founded in 1911, the battalion in 1912 became part of the Royal Flying Corps, which in turn evolved into the Royal Air Force.

== Establishment ==
In 1911, following the growth in early aviation activity, the War Office issued instructions for the School of Ballooning, which had originally been formed in 1888, to be expanded into a battalion. An order was issued on 28 February 1911 for the formation of the Air Battalion of the Royal Engineers effective 1 April the same year. The initial establishment was 14 officers and 150 other ranks. Officers could be selected from any branch of the service whereas other ranks were selected from the Corps of Royal Engineers.

Pilots had to already have earned a Royal Aero Club certificate from a private flying school. The GBP 75 charge for flight training was reimbursed only if the student passed the course.

== Structure and activities ==
The battalion comprised two companies and a headquarters located at Farnborough. The commander of the Air Battalion was Major Sir Alexander Bannerman.

No. 1 Company, at Farnborough, was equipped with airships and was under the command of Captain Edward Maitland, an experienced balloon and airship pioneer. He also helped pioneer the parachute and in 1913 made the first parachute jump from an airship.

No. 2 Company, at Larkhill on Salisbury Plain, was equipped with aeroplanes and was commanded by Captain John Fulton. A mechanical engineer from the Royal Field Artillery, Fulton had been an early enthusiast of military flying and had attended the world's first air show at Rheims in 1909. He had earned his pilot's certificate, number 27, on 15 November 1910.

On 17 September 1911, Lt. R.A. Cammell, RE was killed in the crash of a Valkyrie monoplane at Hendon airfield; a 1922 account of the formation of the RAF states this was the only fatal accident in the Air Battalion.

On 14 February 1912, Lt. Barrington-Kennet flew a government-bought aeroplane – a two-seater Nieuport monoplane with a 50 hp Gnome engine – 249.5 miles in 4 hours and 32 minutes, setting a record.

== Creation of the Royal Flying Corps ==
In October 1911, Italy's use of aircraft in combat against the Ottoman Empire in Tripoli, Libya led to the formation of a sub-committee of the British Imperial Defence Staff to recommend policy for the future of British military flying. The committee recommended the formation of a separate flying corps and on 13 April 1912 the Royal Flying Corps was created, with the Air Battalion becoming its Military Wing on 13 May.

No. 1 Company became No. 1 Squadron RFC on 1 April 1911.

No. 2 Company became No. 3 Squadron RFC on 1 April 1911 and a detachment of No. 2 Company became No. 2 Squadron RFC on 13 May 1912.

ASL Valkyrie

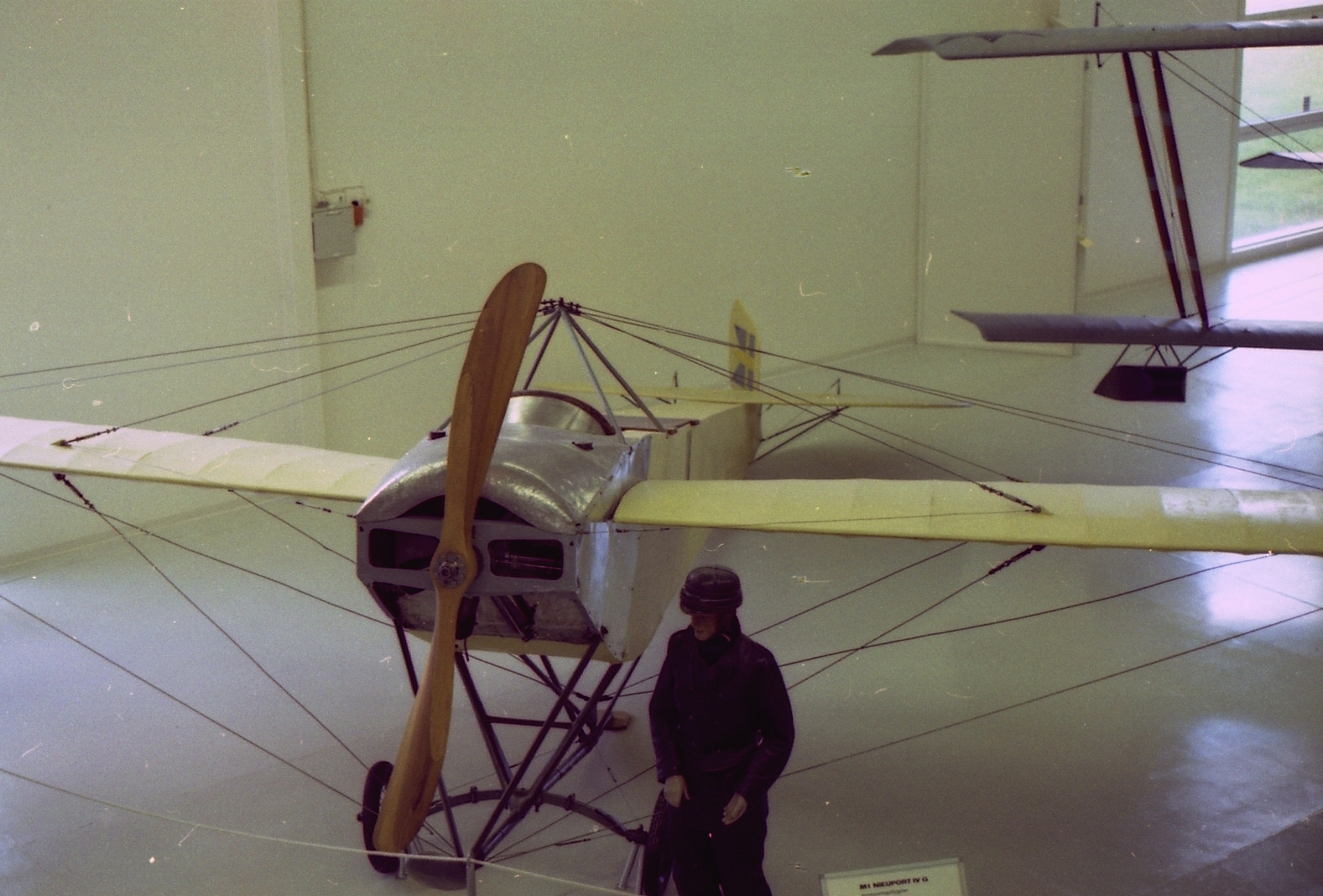
Nieuport IV

Breguet III

== See also ==
- Bertram Dickson – first British serviceman to fly in 1910, pre-dating the Air Battalion

| Preceded by School of Ballooning | Air Battalion; 1911–1912 | Succeeded by Royal Flying Corps (Military Wing) |
