= John Farley Leith =

British lawyer and Liberal politician

John Farley Leith QC MP
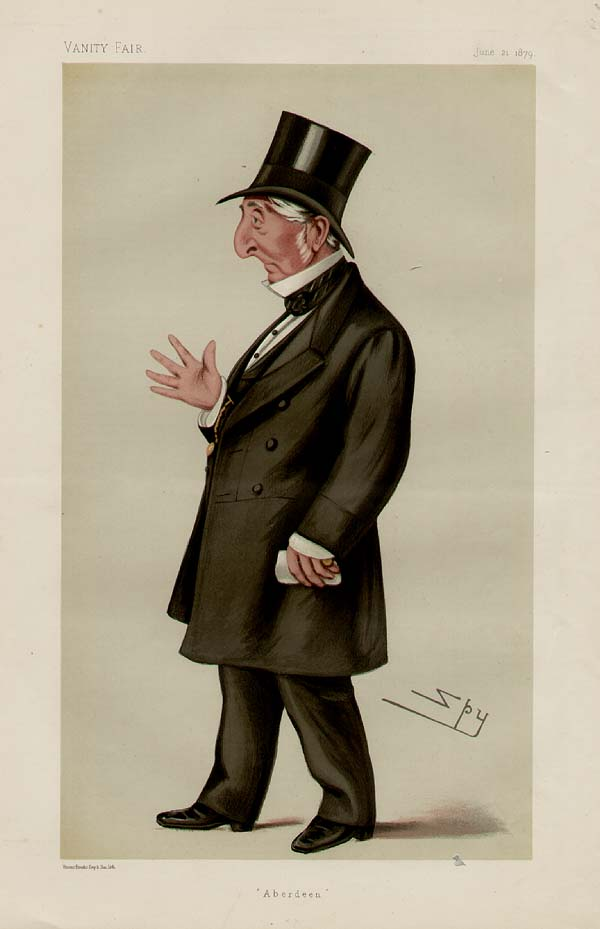
- 1879 caricature of John Farley Leith in Vanity Fair

Member of Parliament for Aberdeen
- In office 29 June 1872 – 3 April 1880
- Preceded by: William Henry Sykes
- Succeeded by: John Webster

Personal details
- Born: 5 May 1808
- Died: 4 April 1887 (aged 78)
- Party: Liberal
- Education: University of Aberdeen

John Farley Leith, QC (5 May 1808 – 4 April 1887) was a British lawyer and Liberal politician.

== Life ==
He was the eldest son of James Urquhart Murray Leith, of Barrach, Aberdeenshire, killed in 1814 at the Battle of Orthez with the 68th Regiment. He was educated at Marischal College and Aberdeen University. He studied law at the Middle Temple and was called to the bar in 1830.

Leith practised as a barrister in the Calcutta High Court from 1832 to 1846 and was then Professor of Law at the East India Company's Haileybury College from 1853 to 1857. He was made QC in 1872 and a bencher in 1874.

He was elected MP for Aberdeen at a by-election in 1872 but stood down at the 1880 general election.

Leith died in 1887.

== Family ==
In 1832 Leith married Alicia Anne, the daughter of Samuel Tomkins (the elder) of London, a banker, with whom he had issue. Their daughter Mary Anne married Sir William Miller, 1st Baronet. Their sons included Edward Tyrrell Leith, law professor at the University of Bombay, and the barrister William Gordon Ernest Leith.

Parliament of the United Kingdom
Preceded by William Henry Sykes	Member of Parliament for Aberdeen; 1872 – 1880	Succeeded by John Webster
