= Campbell-Bannerman (surname) =

Campbell-Bannerman is a compound surname, composed of Campbell and Bannerman. It is also a political family in the United Kingdom.

Notable people with this name include:

- Charlotte, Lady Campbell-Bannerman (1832–1906), wife of Henry
- David Campbell Bannerman (born 1960), British Conservative politician
- Henry Campbell-Bannerman (1836–1908), British Liberal politician
