= George Thompson (shipowner) =

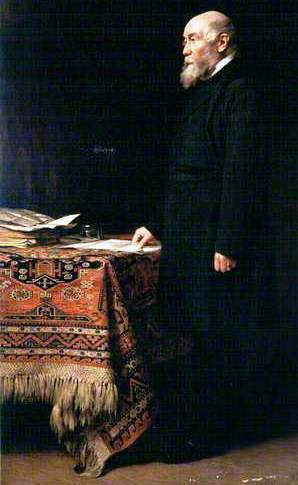
George Thompson by Sir George Reid

George Thompson of Pitmedden (1804–1895) was a Scottish Whig politician who was The Lord Provost of Aberdeen and MP for the city. He was also the founder of the Aberdeen Line shipping company.

== Background ==
He was born at Woolwich on 23 June 1804.

His father, Andrew Thomson (sic), served in the Royal Regiment of Artillery before joining the East India Company in 1805.

George Thompson, always known as George Thompson Junior to distinguish himself from his grandfather, was educated at Aberdeen Grammar School. He then joined the Aberdeen office of the London Shipping Company. In 1825, aged 21, he set up his own business as a ship and insurance broker, with offices in Aberdeen. In the same year his name first appeared as a subscribing owner of a small Aberdeen ship, and his shipowning interests rapidly developed. He also traded the imports which his vessels brought back to Aberdeen.

== Political career ==
George Thompson served as Provost of Aberdeen from 1847 to 1850. The highlight of his term of office was welcoming Queen Victoria and Prince Albert to Aberdeen on 8 September 1848. They were on their way to Balmoral for the first time. This was the first occasion a monarch had visited Aberdeen since 1650. A crowd of 80,000 people turned out to greet her.

In 1852 he was persuaded to stand as a Whig candidate for Aberdeen and defeated another Whig, Andrew Leith Hay by 682 votes to 478. He was an advocate of further parliamentary reform, and associated with Richard Cobden and John Bright in the repeal of the Corn Laws. After retiring from Parliament in 1857, he took no further part in politics.

== The Aberdeen White Star Line ==
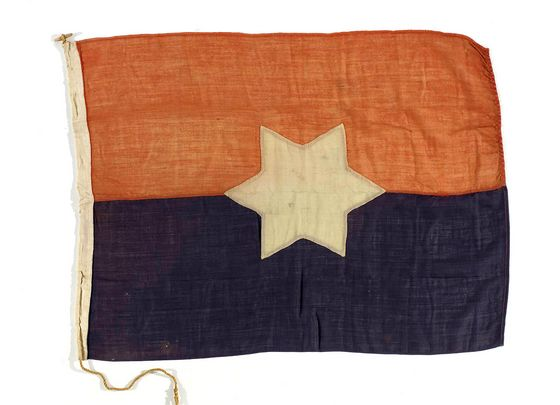
George Thompson & Co. Ltd house flag

In his first 15 years Thompson operated a seasonal liner service to Canada and built up a fleet of a dozen vessels with trades extending to Cuba, South America, the Baltic, the Mediterranean, South Africa and the Far East. 1840 saw the launch of the first ship built at Walter Hood's yard in Aberdeen for Thompson, and this yard built most of his ships up to 1881. They included some of the world's finest clippers.

In 1842 one of his ships undertook an emigrant charter to New Zealand, and in the same year his first ship visited Australia. By 1846 his ships had become established in the Australian trade. Initially this was to Sydney, but with the discovery of gold at Ballarat the ships also traded to Melbourne. Thompson first established the Aberdeen Line (or Aberdeen White star Line to distinguish it from John T. Rennie's Aberdeen Line) on the Australian trade in his own right in 1856. From that time, Thompson's ships were distinguished by their green-painted hulls, their white masts and yards and the red and blue house flag with the six-pointed white star which gave rise to the alternative name.

Thompson entered the China tea trade in 1848. A regular voyage pattern was soon established: London to Australia with passengers and general cargo; Australia to China, Japan or Russia with coal; and thence via a Chinese port with tea. The famous clipper Thermopylae was designed for this trade. On her maiden voyage in 1869 she broke records for London to Melbourne, Newcastle (NSW) to Shanghai and Foochow to London. Ousted from the tea trade by steamers in 1879, Thermopylae was deployed as a wool clipper on the Australian trade. In both the Chinese tea trade and the Australian wool trade her chief rival was Cutty Sark.

Thermopylae was one of only two composite (i.e. iron and hardwood) ships owned by Thompson. Thereafter his ships were mainly constructed of iron. They included Patriarch and Samuel Plimsoll. George Thompson had adopted the famous loadline recommendations long before they became mandatory in 1890.

In 1881 Walter Hood's yard was sold, as the age of sail was coming to an end. From then on the Line built up an initial fleet of five steamers: Aberdeen, Australasian, Damascus, Thermopylae (2) and Nineveh. Initially they steamed out to Australia via Cape Town and returned via the Suez Canal, but from 1895 they came back via Cape Town.

Thompson died in Aberdeen on 11 April 1895 and was buried in Dyce churchyard. His safety track record as a shipowner had been exceptional, seldom losing a ship, and he never insured his ships against loss. Instead he invested the money he had saved in insurance premiums in the purchase of new ships and the maintenance of his existing ships. In this way he developed what has been called 'one of the greatest Lines in British merchant navy history'.

== Family ==
In 1830 Thompson married Christiana Little Kidd (1806–1874), a daughter of James Kidd DD (1761–1834), an evangelical preacher. They had four sons and four daughters. One daughter married William Henderson, who later succeeded him as chairman of the Line and then serve as Lord Provost of Aberdeen, being knighted in 1893.

In 1908 Thompson's granddaughter, Muriel Thompson, won the first ever Ladies' Race at Brooklands race track. In World War I she was an ambulance driver with the First Aid Nursing Yeomanry (FANY). For her bravery under fire she received the Order of Leopold II, the Croix de Guerre and the Médaille militaire, and was also mentioned in despatches.

His great grandchildren included Lord Devlin, who was the youngest High Court judge to be appointed in the 20th century and subsequently a Law Lord, and Alison Leggatt, a noted character actress.

== Other interests ==
Thompson was a generous supporter of the Free Church of Scotland, and has been described as Aberdeen's most generous benefactor of his age. In weeks just prior to his death, he handed out £4000 among a number of prominent Aberdeen charities. He supported an extension of the Aberdeen Royal Infirmary, and bestowed £5000 to the University of Aberdeen to provide bursaries in medicine.

In later life he lived at Pitmedden House, his estate to the west of Aberdeen. He was a Deputy Lieutenant of Aberdeenshire. He is buried with his wife and some of their children in the family plot in the United Free Church graveyard at Dyce.

== Notes ==
Parts of article was compiled in July 2010 by relatives of George Thompson, with help from historian Captain Peter King

- MacDonagh, Oliver (1962). "The Anti-Imperialism of Free Trade". The Economic History Review. New Series. 14 (3): 489–501. doi:10.1111/j.1468-0289.1962.tb00063.x.

Parliament of the United Kingdom
Preceded by Alexander Fordyce	Member of Parliament for Aberdeen; 1852–1857	Succeeded by William Henry Sykes
Civic offices
Preceded by Sir Thomas Blaikie	Provost of Aberdeen; 1847–1850	Succeeded by George Henry
