= William Henry Sykes =

British politician and naturalist

Colonel William Henry Sykes FRS MP
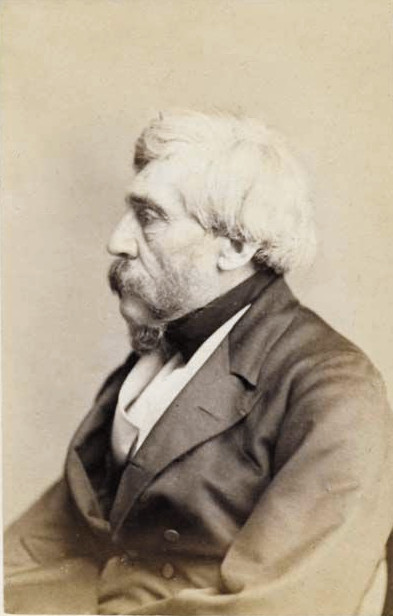
- William Henry Sykes by Whitlock, 1860s
- Born: 25 January 1790; Near Bradford, Yorkshire
- Died: 16 June 1872 (aged 82); Kensington, London
- Known for: One of the pioneers of the Victorian statistical movement, a founder of the Royal Statistical Society
- Scientific career
- Fields: Politician, Indologist, ornithologist
- Institutions: Honourable East India Company, Member of Parliament
- Author abbrev. (zoology): Sykes

Colonel William Henry Sykes, FRS (25 January 1790 – 16 June 1872) was an English naturalist who served with the British military in India and was specifically known for his work with the Indian Army as a politician, Indologist and ornithologist. One of the pioneers of the Victorian statistical movement, a founder of the Royal Statistical Society, he conducted surveys and examined the efficiency of army operation. Returning from service in India, he became a director of the East India Company and a member of parliament representing Aberdeen.

== Life and career ==
Sykes was born near Bradford in Yorkshire. His father was Samuel Sykes of Friezing Hall, and they belonged to the family of Sykeses of Yorkshire. He joined military service as a cadet in 1803 and obtained a commission on 1 May 1804 with the Honourable East India Company. Joining the Bombay Army, he was to lieutenancy on 12 October 1805. He saw action at the siege of Bhurtpur under Lord Lake in 1805. He commanded a regiment at the battles of Kirkee and Poonah and was involved in the capture of hill forts. By 1810 he could speak Hindi and Marathi languages. He became a captain on 25 January 1819 and travelled for four years across Europe from 1820. He returned to India in October 1824 and was appointed by Mountstuart Elphinstone as a statistical reporter to the Bombay government. He then collected statistical and natural history researches, and completed a census of the population of the Deccan, producing two voluminous statistical reports, and a complete natural history report illustrated with drawings. He married Elizabeth, daughter of William Hay of Renistoun, in 1824. He was promoted to the rank of major on 8 September 1826 and to lieutenant-colonel on 9 April 1831. In December 1829 the post of statistical reporter was abolished, but he took leave from military duty and continued to work on his statistical surveys. He completed this in January 1831 and left for Europe on furlough. He retired from active service with the rank of colonel on 18 June 1833, and in September 1835 he became a Royal Commissioner in Lunacy, a post he held till 1845. On account of his knowledge of Indian matters, he was made a director of the East India Company in 1840. In 1867 he was elected chairman of the court of directors of the East India Company.

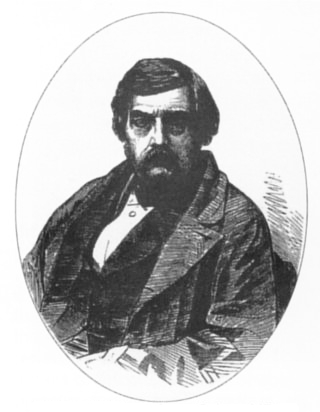
Sykes in 1857

In 1847 he tried to contest for the Member of Parliament seat for Aberdeen but failed. In 1857 he contested again, representing the liberal interest against John Farley Leith, and was elected. He continued to hold the seat for several terms. He was elected president of the Royal Asiatic Society in 1858. He was also a member of the Society of Arts and the Royal British Association.

Sykes was elected Lord Rector of Marischal College, Aberdeen (whose founder, George Keith, 5th Earl Marischal, was an ancestor of his wife) in 1854. He took a special interest in libraries and information accessibility, seeking university libraries to remain open for longer and supporting the role of public libraries. He noted that England was lagging behind Europe in the size of public libraries noting that the per-capita availability of books in London was 22 books for 100 persons while Paris had 160 for 100, Florence 317 per 100; Dresden 490 per 100; Munich 780; and Copenhagen 467 per 100. He also noted that Munich had 17 public libraries. In his installation talk as Lord Rector, he also claimed that he could help establish a commission in the Indian Army for the best students of mathematics, natural philosophy, natural history, Biblical criticism and classics if they had expertise in military drawing, and geology apart from good conduct. He was a founder member, in 1835, and president of the Royal Statistical Society, 1863–1965; he was the eleventh holder of that post but the first not to be a peer or baronet. He also became an Honorary Metropolitan Commissioner in September 1835. Despite suffering from bronchitis he attended all parliament sessions and died in Kensington, London, aged 82.

== Contributions ==
As a "Statistical Reporter" he travelled across the Deccan region, collecting data on populations apart from collecting natural history specimens. Some of statistical research contributions included the computations of the cost of maintenance per soldier. He calculated for instance that the French army had a much lower cost than that of the British army, which according to him allowed the French to maintain two soldiers for the cost of one "English" soldier. He also worked out that native Indian soldiers were healthier than their European counterparts and that it was possible to provide pension and insurance to Indian soldiers with a very low premium although this was never implemented.

Sykes was a pioneer meteorologist in India, taking regular temperature and atmospheric pressure readings; he noticed regular patterns in diurnal pressure variations and noted that the range was greatest in winter, while the least difference occurred during the monsoons.

Sykes' collections of animals resulted in the publications of catalogues of birds and mammals from the Deccan region, many of which were published in the Proceedings of the Zoological Society. His discoveries included fifty-six birds new to science, including the Indian pond heron. Sykes also studied the fish of the area, and wrote papers on the quails and hemipodes of India. His list of birds of the Deccan contained almost 236 species. He was an authority on the natural history of the Deccan region and he corresponded with many other naturalists. He used his influence during his position at the East India Company and Charles Darwin wrote to him to influence decisions in favour of including Edward Blyth on an expedition to China. Sykes's lark (Galerida deva) of peninsular India is named after him. In addition, a race of blue-headed wagtail (Motacilla flava beema) was given the common name Sykes's wagtail in British Birds (1907).

Sykes wrote extensively on Buddhism and its antiquity. In an 1842 paper published in the Journal of the Asiatic Society, he contended that the Brahmins were likely not native to India and that Pali was older than Sanskrit. He believed that, rather than Brahmanism, it was Buddhism that had reigned supreme in India's ancient past. Referring to the recently translated travelogue of Faxian, Sykes paid tribute to "the literature of that remarkable people—the Chinese" that thankfully existed to illuminate India's past. He hoped that, "by proper means, applied in a cautious, kindly and forbearing spirit, such farther changes may be effected as will raise the intellectual standard of the Hindus, improve their moral and social condition, and assist to promote their eternal welfare." In 1856, the citizens of Bombay presented Sykes with a medal for his advocacy in favour of a native system of education.

Sykes also wrote on the Taiping Rebellion holding the British Government guilty of unjustifiable aggression towards China. He also held the British responsible for precipitating the 1857 rebellion by being insensitive to local customs, citing the earlier case of the Vellore mutiny. In a commentary to the British media which had suggested that the mutineers were using greased cartridges, one of the immediate causes of the uprising, against the British he pointed out that they were all using 'Brown Bess' and conventional musket ammunition. He was one of the founding members of the Asiatic Society of Bombay.

== Legacy ==
- The Sykes' monkey Cercopithecus albogularis was named after him.
- The bird Sykes's nightjar or the Sindh nightjar Caprimulgus mahrattensis was named after him.
- The bird Sykes's warbler Iduna rama was named after him.

== Publications ==
- Sykes, W.H. (1846). "Statistics of the Administration of Civil and Criminal Justice in British India from 1841 to 1844, both Inclusive". Journal of the Statistical Society of London. 9 (4): 310–338. doi:10.2307/2337677. JSTOR 2337677.
- Sykes, WH (1839). "On the Quails and Hemipodii of India". Transactions of the Zoological Society of London. 2 (1): 1–24. doi:10.1111/j.1469-7998.1839.tb00004.x.
- Sykes, WH (1839). "On the Fishes of the Dukhun". Transactions of the Zoological Society of London. 2 (5): 349–378. doi:10.1111/j.1469-7998.1839.tb00029.x.
- Sykes, WH (1839). "Some Account of the Land-crabs of the Dukhun". Transactions of the Royal Entomological Society of London. 2 (3): 181–184. doi:10.1111/j.1365-2311.1839.tb03206.x.
- Sykes, WH (1836). "Land Tenures of Dukhun". Journal of the Royal Asiatic Society of Great Britain & Ireland. 3 (2): 350–376. doi:10.1017/S0035869X00014337. JSTOR 44011994. S2CID 162483236.
- Sykes, WH 1834–8. On the Fishes of the Dukhun, and on the Fossils collected at Cutch.
- Sykes, WH (1835). "On the atmospheric tides and meteorology of Dukhun (Deccan), East Indies". Philosophical Transactions of the Royal Society. 125: 161–220. Bibcode:1835RSPT..125..161S. doi:10.1098/rstl.1835.0012. S2CID 186208263.
- Sykes, W.H. (1850). "Discussion of meteorological observations taken in India, at various heights, embracing those at Dodabetta on the Neelgherry Mountains, at 8640 feet above the level of the sea". Philosophical Transactions of the Royal Society of London. 140: 297–378. doi:10.1098/rstl.1850.0016. S2CID 111239855.
- Sykes, W.H. (1833). "On a portion of Dukhun, East Indies". Transactions of the Geological Society. 4 (2): 409–432. doi:10.1144/transgslb.4.2.409. S2CID 140668005.
- Sykes, WH 1837. On the Increase of Wealth and Expenditure in the various classes of Society in the United Kingdom.
- Sykes, WH 1838. Special Reports on the Statistics of the Four Collectorates of Dukhun.
- Sykes, WH 1841. Notes on the Religious, Moral and Political State of Ancient India.
- Sykes, WH 1847. Prices of the Cerelia and other Edibles in India and England compared. Quarterly Journal of the Statistical Society of London 10(4):289-315.

Notes in the Journal of the Royal Asiatic Society

- Sykes, W.H. (1835). "Description of the wild dog of the Western Ghats". Transactions of the Royal Asiatic Society of Great Britain and Ireland. 3 (3): 405–411. doi:10.1017/S0950473700001142.
- Sykes, W.H. (1835). "Some account of the Kolisurra silk-worm of the Deccan". Transactions of the Royal Asiatic Society of Great Britain and Ireland. 3 (3): 541–547. doi:10.1017/S0950473700001245.
- Sykes, WH 1833. Ornaments on figures in cave temples at Karli. 451.
- Sykes, WH (1835). "Land Tenures of the Dekkan". Journal of the Royal Asiatic Society of Great Britain and Ireland. 2 (4): 205–233. doi:10.1017/S0035869X00094363. JSTOR 25207464. S2CID 163125872.
- Sykes, WH 1837. The Upas or Poison-tree of Java. 194.
- Sykes, WH 1837. Inscriptions from the Budh caves near Junar. 287.
- Sykes, WH 1837. Oil and cordage plants of the Dekhan, Addenda 22.
- Sykes, WH 1839. Siva in the cave temples at Elephanta and Ellora. 81.
- Sykes, WH 1839. Inscription at Sanchi re proprietary right in the soil. 246
- Sykes, WH 1839. India before the Mohameddan invasion. 248.
- Sykes, WH 1848. Catalogue of Chinese Buddhistical works. 199
- Sykes, WH 1856. Miniature chaityas and Buddhist inscriptions in Sarnath. 37.
- Sykes, WH 1858. Traits of Indian character. 223.
- Sykes, WH 1858. Golden relics discovered in Rangoon. 298

== See also ==
- Category:Taxa named by William Henry Sykes

Parliament of the United Kingdom
Preceded by George Thompson	Member of Parliament for Aberdeen; 1857–1872	Succeeded by John Farley Leith
Academic offices
Preceded by Earl of Carlisle	Rector of Marischal College, Aberdeen; 1854–1855	Succeeded by Austen Henry Layard
