= Sir Alexander Bannerman, 9th Baronet =

Scottish diplomat

Sir Alexander Bannerman, Bt

Personal details
- Born: Alexander Bannerman; 6 April 1823 Aberdeen, Scotland
- Died: 21 April 1877 (aged 54) Belgravia, London
- Spouse(s): Lady Arabella Diana Sackville-West (m. 1860; died 1869) Lady Katherine Ashburnham (m. 1874)
- Relations: Charles Carnegie, 11th Earl of Southesk (grandson); Anthony Keith-Falconer, 7th Earl of Kintore (cousin); Sir Alexander Bannerman, Bt (grandfather)
- Children: Ethel Carnegie, Countess of Southesk
- Parent(s): Sir Charles Bannerman, 8th Baronet; Anne Bannerman
- Education: Trinity College, Cambridge

Sir Alexander Bannerman, 9th Baronet (6 April 1823 – 21 April 1877) was a Scottish diplomat.

== Early life ==
Alexander was born on 6 April 1823. He was the eldest son of Sir Charles Bannerman, 8th Baronet (1782–1851), and Anne Bannerman, who were first cousins.

The Bannerman baronetcy was created in the Baronetage of Nova Scotia in 1682 by King Charles II on account of the 1st Baronet's "constant loyalty during the rebellion, and of the heavy calamities he had suffered on that account." His aunt, Maria Bannerman, was married to William Keith-Falconer, 6th Earl of Kintore, and were the parents of his cousin, Anthony Keith-Falconer, 7th Earl of Kintore. His uncle, Dr. James Bannerman, was a physician and professor like his paternal grandfather, Sir Alexander Bannerman, 6th Baronet. His maternal grandfather, Charles Bannerman, was the younger brother of his paternal grandfather, the 6th Baronet.

== Career ==
He was educated at Trinity College, Cambridge. He was attached to the British Legation at Florence between 1844 and 1847. Upon the death of his father on 18 June 1851, he succeeded as the 9th Baronet Bannerman of Elsick. He bought back part of the Elsick estate that had been sold by the 4th Baronet, who was forced to sell the estate for a nominal price on account of his father's and his alleged participation in the Jacobite rising of 1745.

He held the office of Vice-Lord Lieutenant of Aberdeenshire.

== Personal life ==
On 25 September 1860, Bannerman was married to Lady Arabella Diana Sackville-West (1835–1869), the youngest daughter of Lord Chamberlain George Sackville-West, 5th Earl De La Warr and Elizabeth Sackville-West, Countess De La Warr. They lived at Kirkhill in Aberdeenshire and were the parents of:

- Ethel Mary Elizabeth Bannerman (1868–1947), who married Charles Carnegie, 10th Earl of Southesk, a son of James Carnegie, 9th Earl of Southesk.

After her death, he married Lady Katherine Ashburnham (1841–1885), daughter of Bertram Ashburnham, 4th Earl of Ashburnham and Lady Katherine Charlotte Baillie (a sister of George Baillie-Hamilton, 10th Earl of Haddington), on 20 January 1874.

Sir Alexander died on 21 April 1877 at 46 Grosvenor Place in Belgravia, London. As he had no sons, the baronetcy passed to his extended cousin, George Bannerman (1827–1901), who was the grandson of the 6th Baronet's younger brother Thomas and the father of Sir Alexander Bannerman, 11th Baronet. The widowed Lady Bannerman retired to Upper Brook Street where she lived until her death in 1885.

=== Descendants ===
Through his daughter Ethel, he was a grandfather of five, three boys and two girls, including Lady Katherine Ethel Carnegie (b. 1892), who married Maj. Arthur Rivers Bosanquet, eldest son and heir of Richard Arthur Bosanquet; Charles Alexander Carnegie, 11th Earl of Southesk (1893–1992), who married Princess Maud (a granddaughter of King Edward VII); Commander Hon. Alexander Bannerman Carnegie (b. 1894), who his cousin Susan Ottilia de Rodakowski-Rivers and, after her death, Cynthia Averil Gurney; Lady Mary Elizabeth Carnegie (1899–1996), who married Vice-Admiral Conolly Abel Smith; and Major Hon. James Duthac Carnegie (1910–1996), who married Claudia Katharine Angela Blackburn, a daughter of Lord of Session Robert Blackburn, Lord Blackburn, and granddaughter of Claude Bowes-Lyon, 13th Earl of Strathmore and Kinghorne.

Baronetage of Nova Scotia
Preceded by Charles Bannerman	Baronet (of Elsick); 1851–1877	Succeeded by George Bannerman
