= Casey Bannerman =

Canadian artist (born 1987)

Casey Bannerman (4 November 1987) is a basketball artist based in Toronto, Ontario, Canada. Bannerman has collaborated with National Basketball Association (NBA) athletes including Toronto Raptors point guard Fred VanVleet.

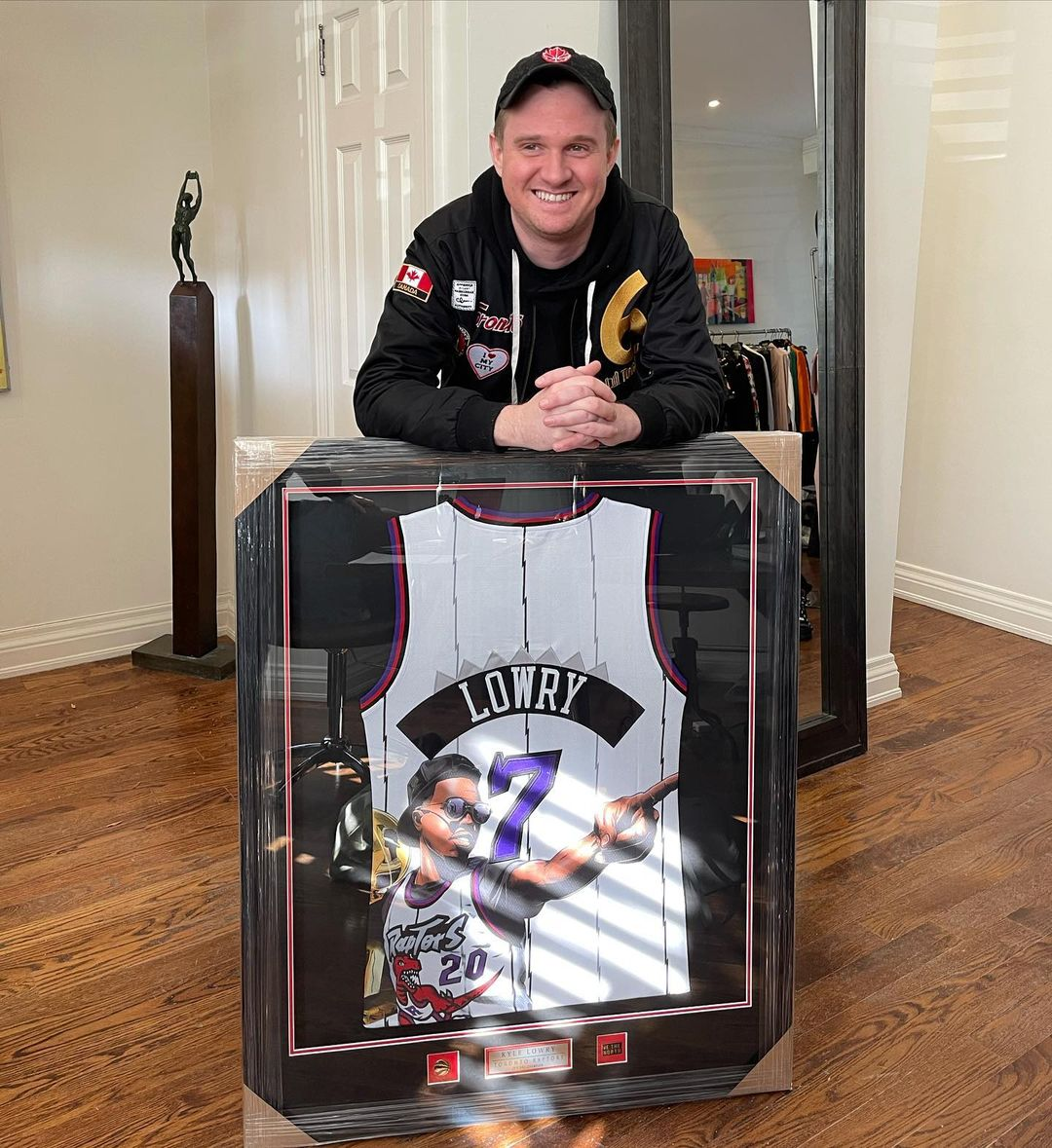
Casey Bannerman poses with custom jersey
