= Sir Arthur Bannerman, 12th Baronet =

British Indian Army officer, colonial administrator and courtier (1866–1955)

Sir Arthur Bannerman
- Born: 20 February 1866
- Died: 27 April 1955 (aged 89)
- Military career
- Allegiance: United Kingdom
- Branch: Indian Army
- Rank: Lieutenant-Colonel
- Unit: Indian Staff Corps
- Conflicts: First World War
- Awards: Knight Commander of the Royal Victorian Order; Companion of the Order of the Indian Empire

Lieutenant-Colonel Sir Arthur D'Arcy Gordon Bannerman, 12th Baronet, KCVO, CIE (20 February 1866 – 27 April 1955) was a British Indian Army officer, colonial administrator and courtier.

Bannerman was the son of Colonel Patrick Wilson Bannerman and Flora Lindsay Vanrenen. He was educated at Harrow School before attending the Royal Military College, Sandhurst.

He commissioned into the Indian Staff Corps and was promoted to captain on 29 August 1896. In 1903 he was invested as Companion of the Order of the Indian Empire after having been Secretary of the Executive Committee for the 1903 Delhi Durbar. He saw active service during the First World War, before becoming Political Resident in Jammu and Kashmir in 1917. Bannerman held the post until 1921, when he became Political Aide-de-Camp to the Secretary of State for India, serving in the role until 1928. That year he was made Knight Commander of the Royal Victorian Order.

In 1928 he became a Gentleman Usher to George V. On 10 March 1934 he succeeded a cousin, Sir Alexander Bannerman, 11th Baronet, as baronet. He subsequently served as an Extra Gentleman Usher to Edward VIII, George VI and Elizabeth II successively until his death in 1955.

Baronetage of Nova Scotia
Preceded by Alexander Bannerman	Baronet (of Elsick); 1934–1955	Succeeded by Donald Bannerman
