= Sara Bannerman =

Communications professor in Canada

Sara Bannerman is a full professor and Canada Research Chair at McMaster University's Department of Communication Studies and Media Arts. She also received a bachelor's in music from Queen's University. She is the Canada Research Chair (CRC) in Communication Policy and Governance (Tier 2); she was first appointed as a CRC in 2017, and renewed for a 2021 appointment.

== Research ==
Bannerman's research examines the power relationships between digital platforms and the state, especially privacy and platform regulation. In 2022, she received an Insight Grant from the Social Sciences and Humanities Research Council (SSHRC) for a project titled "Digital governance in Canada: Politics, players, and struggles for influence". She was a governing board member of the International Society for the Theory and History of Intellectual Property.

Bannerman co-edited The Algorithmic Distribution of News: Policy Responses with James Meese. This book examines government policies and regulatory responses to the increasing influence of digital platforms on news distribution.

She holds a Bachelor of Music from Queen’s University, and a Master of Arts (2004) and a PhD (2009) in communication studies from Carleton University.

Bannerman has published over 40 papers, which have been cited over 450 times.

In 2025, she expressed concerns over the Bill C-4 Proposal.

Bannerman is a professor at McMaster University in Canada, and is the director for their Communications Governance Observatory.

== Selected academic publications ==
- Bannerman, Sara. Canadian Communication Policy and Law. Toronto: Canadian Scholars' Press, 2020.
- Bannerman, Sara. The Struggle for Canadian Copyright: Imperialism to Internationalism, 1842-1971. UBC Press, 2013.
- Bannerman, Sara. International Copyright and Access to Knowledge. Cambridge University Press, 2016.
- Crowdfunding culture. S Bannerman. Journal of Mobile Media. 2013.
- Historical institutionalism in communication studies. S Bannerman and B Haggart. Communication Theory. 2015.
- Middle Powers and International Copyright History: the case of Canada. S Bannerman. Copyright Future Copyright Freedom. 2011.
