= Aberdeen (UK Parliament constituency) =

Parliamentary constituency in the United Kingdom, 1832–1885

- Former burgh constituency for the House of Commons
- Subdivisions of Scotland: Aberdeenshire
- Major settlements: Aberdeen

1832–1885
- Seats: One
- Created from: Aberdeen Burghs
- Replaced by: Aberdeen North; Aberdeen South

Aberdeen was a burgh constituency of the House of Commons of the Parliament of the United Kingdom from 1832 until 1885. It was represented by one Member of Parliament (MP), elected by the first past the post voting system.

== Boundaries ==
As created in 1832, the constituency covered the burgh of Aberdeen, which was previously within the Aberdeen Burghs constituency. Together with Aberdeenshire, Aberdeen was one of two constituencies covering the county of Aberdeen.

The boundaries of the constituency, as set out in the 1832 Act, were-

"From the Point, on the North-west of the Town, at which the Scatter Burn joins the River Don, down the River Don to the Point at which the same joins the Sea; thence along the Sea Shore to the Point at which the River Dee joins the Sea; thence up the River Dee to a Point which is distant One hundred Yards (measured along the River Dee) above the Bridge of Dee; thence in a straight Line to the Point at which the March between the Parishes of Old Machar and Banchory Davenick crosses the Old-Dee-side Road; thence, Northward, along the March between the Parishes of Old Machar and Banchory Davenick, and Old Machar and Newhills, to the Point first described."

In 1885, the Aberdeen constituency was divided between Aberdeen North and Aberdeen South.

== Members of Parliament ==
Election	Member	Party
1832	Alexander Bannerman	Whig
1847	Alexander Fordyce	Whig
1852	George Thompson	Radical
1857	William Henry Sykes	Whig
1859	William Henry Sykes	Liberal
1872 by-election	John Farley Leith	Liberal
1880	John Webster	Liberal
1885	Redistribution of Seats Act: constituency abolished	

== Election results ==
=== Elections in the 1880s ===
General election 1880: Aberdeen
Party	Candidate	Votes	%	±%
Liberal	John Webster	7,505	70.5	+11.6
Conservative	James Shaw	3,139	29.5	−11.6
Majority		4,366	41.0	+23.2
Turnout		10,644	75.0	+29.5
Registered electors		14,184		
Liberal hold		Swing	+11.6	

=== Elections in the 1870s ===
General election 1874: Aberdeen
Party	Candidate	Votes	%	±%
Liberal	John Farley Leith	3,910	58.9	N/A
Conservative	James Shaw	2,724	41.1	N/A
Majority		1,186	17.8	N/A
Turnout		6,634	45.5	N/A
Registered electors		14,585		
Liberal hold				

By-election, 29 June 1872: Aberdeen
Party	Candidate	Votes	%	±%
Liberal	John Farley Leith	4,392	57.0	N/A
Liberal	James William Barclay	2,615	33.9	N/A
Conservative	James Shaw	704	9.1	New
Majority		1,777	23.1	N/A
Turnout		7,711	55.1	N/A
Registered electors		13,996		
Liberal hold				

- Caused by Sykes' death.

=== Elections in the 1860s ===
General election 1868: Aberdeen
Party	Candidate	Votes	%	±%
Liberal	William Henry Sykes	Unopposed		
Registered electors		8,312		
Liberal hold				

General election 1865: Aberdeen
Party	Candidate	Votes	%	±%
Liberal	William Henry Sykes	Unopposed		
Registered electors		3,996		
Liberal hold				

=== Elections in the 1850s ===
General election 1859: Aberdeen
Party	Candidate	Votes	%	±%
Liberal	William Henry Sykes	Unopposed		
Registered electors		3,442		
Liberal hold				

General election 1857: Aberdeen
Party	Candidate	Votes	%	±%
Whig	William Henry Sykes	1,035	54.9	N/A
Whig	John Farley Leith	849	45.1	N/A
Majority		186	9.8	N/A
Turnout		1,884	80.3	+54.8
Registered electors		2,346		
Whig gain from Radical		Swing	N/A	

General election 1852: Aberdeen
Party	Candidate	Votes	%	±%
Radical	George Thompson	682	58.8	N/A
Whig	Andrew Leith Hay	478	41.2	N/A
Majority		204	17.6	N/A
Turnout		1,160	25.5	−14.3
Registered electors		4,547		
Radical gain from Whig		Swing	N/A	

=== Elections in the 1840s ===
General election 1847: Aberdeen
Party	Candidate	Votes	%	±%
Whig	Alexander Fordyce	918	68.5	N/A
Whig	William Henry Sykes	422	31.5	N/A
Majority		496	37.0	+16.8
Turnout		1,340	39.8	−20.6
Registered electors		3,364		
Whig hold		Swing	N/A	

General election 1841: Aberdeen
Party	Candidate	Votes	%	±%
Whig	Alexander Bannerman	780	59.0	N/A
Conservative	William Innes	513	38.8	New
Chartist	Robert Lowery	30	2.3	New
Majority		267	20.2	N/A
Turnout		1,323	60.4	N/A
Registered electors		2,189		
Whig hold		Swing	N/A	

=== Elections in the 1830s ===
General election 1837: Aberdeen
Party	Candidate	Votes	%
Whig	Alexander Bannerman	Unopposed	
Registered electors		2,110	
Whig hold			

General election 1835: Aberdeen
Party	Candidate	Votes	%
Whig	Alexander Bannerman	938	71.6
Conservative	Arthur Farquhar	372	28.4
Majority		566	43.2
Turnout		1,310	62.4
Registered electors		2,098	
Whig hold			

General election 1832: Aberdeen
Party	Candidate	Votes	%
Whig	Alexander Bannerman	Unopposed	
Registered electors		2,024	
Whig win (new seat)			
