= William Bannerman (minister) =

Presbyterian minister in Otago, New Zealand (1822–1902)

William Bannerman (8 September 1822 – 24 December 1902) was a pioneering Presbyterian minister in Otago, New Zealand.

Bannerman was born in Kirkcaldy, Fife, Scotland in 1822, and received his tertiary education at the University of Edinburgh followed by the Free Church Theological College. He emigrated to New Zealand and arrived in Port Chalmers on the Stately on 5 February 1854. Bannerman settled at Puerua, and he was responsible for the sparsely populated area between Waihola and Riverton. Bannerman set up much of the administrative framework for the Presbyterian church in New Zealand. He received the honorary degree Doctor of Divinity (DD) from the University of Edinburgh (in absentia) in April 1900. Bannerman died on 24 December 1902 in Dunedin.

Bannerman married Jane Burns on 21 May 1856 at Dunedin.
