= Clan Bannerman =

Lowland Scottish clan

- Clann Mac a' Bhrataich
- Crest: A demi man in armour holding in his right hand a sword, Proper
- Motto: Pro Patria ("For my Country")

Chief
- Sir David Gordon Bannerman of Elsick
- 15th Baronet of Elsick
- Seat: Elsick House
Allied clans
Clan Forbes
Rival clans
Clan Gordon

Clan Bannerman (Scottish Gaelic: Mac a' Bhrataich) is a Lowland Scottish clan.

== History ==
=== Origins of the clan ===
==== Traditional origins ====
The surname Bannerman has its origin in the privilege of the family's ancestors having been the carriers of the royal standard (banner bearers) in the 10th and 11th centuries. The chief's arms also show this honorable office. It is not known exactly when this right passed to the family but according to one tradition it was during the reign of either Malcolm III of Scotland or Alexander I of Scotland. The king is said to have braved the raging waters of the River Spey and Sir Alexander Carron, the king's chamberlain carried the royal standard and the rest of the Scottish army followed. The rebels were defeated and Carron was rewarded by being named the hereditary Standard Bearer to the King. His descendants still bear this privilege.

==== Recorded origins ====
In June 1367 Donald Bannerman was granted the lands of Clyntrees, Waterton and Weltown in the parish of Ellon, Aberdeenshire from David II of Scotland. The Bannermans were required to build a chapel for weekly mass said for the repose of the soul of David II's father, King Robert the Bruce. The Abbot of Kinloss granted to the Bannermans land lying to the west of the city of Aberdeen in 1370.

=== 16th and 17th centuries ===
The Bannermans became involved in the politics of north-east Scotland which included taking sides in the great feud between the powerful Clan Gordon and their enemies the Clan Forbes during the 16th century. The Bannermans generally supported the Forbeses. However, in 1608 Margaret Bannerman married George Gordon of Haddo, son of Sir John Gordon. George Gordon was a loyal supporter of the king and was later executed for opposing the National Covenant. Alexander Bannerman was also a supporter of Charles I of England against the Scottish presbyterians and his estates were only saved from being forfeited by passing them to his brother-in-law, Sir George Hamilton of Tulliallan.

In 1644 Alexander Bannerman fought a duel with his cousin, Sir George Gordon of Haddo in which Gordon was wounded. The family lands were eventually restored to Alexander Bannerman's son, Alexander Bannerman of Elsick. This Alexander Bannerman was created a Baronet of Nova Scotia by Charles II of England on 28 December 1682 for his constant loyalty during the civil war.

=== 18th century and Jacobite risings ===
Alexander Bannerman's youngest son, Sir Patrick, supported the deposed Stuart monarchs during the Jacobite rising of 1715. Sir Patrick was Provost of Aberdeen and presented a loyal address from the town to James Francis Edward Stuart (the Old Pretender) welcoming him to his ancient kingdom of Scotland. James promptly knighted Sir Patrick. Sir Patrick was arrested after the rising had failed and taken as a prisoner to Carlisle to await execution, but he managed to escape to France.

During the Jacobite rising of 1745, Sir Alexander Bannerman, son of the second Baronet, with 160 men of the clan joined Prince Charles Edward Stuart at Stirling in 1745 and was also with the Prince when he escaped the disaster at the Battle of Culloden in 1746. Bannerman fled north to Dingwall and then to Sutherland. He later escaped to France having narrowly escaped government troops by hiding in a secret closet at Elsick. Sir Alexander Bannerman, the fourth Baronet was forced to sell the estates at Elsick due to the threat of forfeiture and suspected Jacobite intrigues.

=== Modern history ===
Henry Campbell-Bannerman was Prime Minister of the United Kingdom from 1905 to 1908. He had assumed the name of Bannerman through his mother in 1868. His first government office was as financial secretary to the War Office. He rapidly rose through the ranks and became Secretary of State for War in 1886. He became a close friend of Edward VII who later made him Prime Minister.

Sir Athur Bannerman, the twelfth Baronet served in the Indian Army and from 1921 to 1928 was a political aide to the Secretary of State for India. He was also appointed as a Gentleman Usher to George V, Edward VIII and also George VI. He was also made a Knight Commander of the Royal Victorian Order in 1928.

John Bannerman, Baron Bannerman of Kildonan was one of Scotland's greatest rugby players, winning 39 caps for his country.

The thirteenth Baronet served in the Cameron Highlanders and became a Russian interpreter.

== Clan chief ==
The current Chief of Clan Bannerman is Sir David Gordon Bannerman of Elsick, 15th Baronet, OBE. Sir David was educated at Gordonstoun School and New College Oxford. He lives in Suffolk and has four children: Claire (b. 1961), Margot (b. 1962), Arabella (b. 1965) and Clodagh (b. 1975) and seven grandchildren Constance, Alexander, Hector, Milo, Ruby, Dylan and Evie. His wife, Lady Mary Prudence Bannerman (née Ardagh Walter) died on 21st April, 2023.
