= Alexander Bannerman =

British politician

Sir Alexander Bannerman
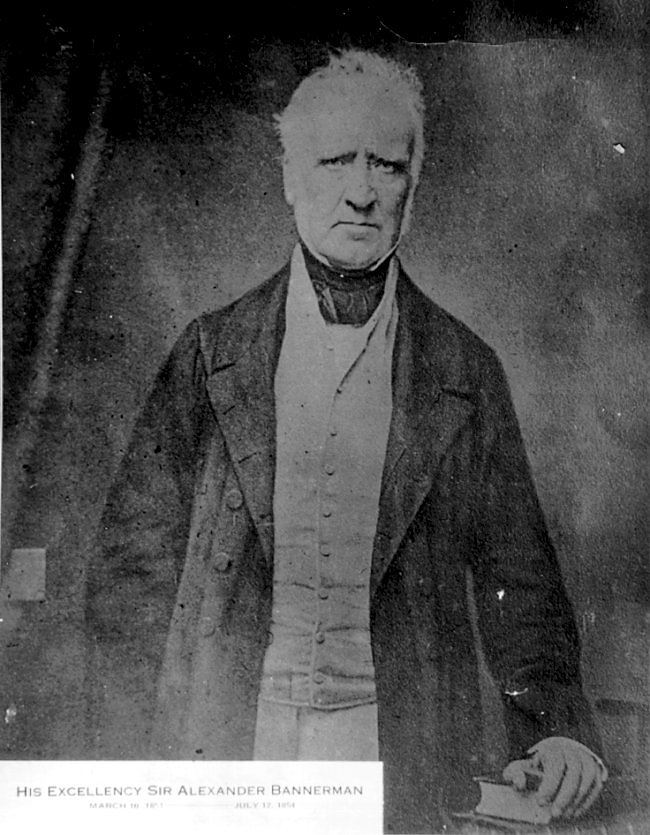

Governor of Newfoundland
- In office 1857–1864
- Preceded by: Sir Charles Henry Darling
- Succeeded by: Sir Anthony Musgrave

Governor of the Bahamas
- In office 1854–1857
- Preceded by: Charles John Bayley
- Succeeded by: John Gregory

Governor of Prince Edward Island
- In office 1851–1854
- Preceded by: Ambrose Lane
- Succeeded by: Dominick Daly

Member of Parliament for Aberdeen
- In office 1832–1847
- Preceded by: New constituency
- Succeeded by: Alexander Fordyce

37th Rector of Marischal College, Aberdeen
- In office 1834–1836
- Preceded by: Sir Charles Forbes
- Succeeded by: Dr. John Abercrombie

Personal details
- Born: 7 October 1788 Aberdeen, Scotland
- Died: 30 December 1864 (aged 76) Mayfair, London
- Spouse: Margaret Gordon (after 1825)
- Relations: Sir Alexander Bannerman, 6th Baronet (uncle)
- Parent(s): Thomas Bannerman; Jean Simson

Viceregal styles of Sir Alexander Bannerman
- Reference style: His Excellency
- Spoken style: Your Excellency

Sir Alexander Bannerman (7 October 1788 – 30 December 1864) was a Scottish merchant, vintner, politician and British colonial governor.

== Early life ==
Known as "Sandy", he was born on 7 October 1788 in Scotland. He was the eldest son of merchant Thomas Bannerman (1743–1820) and his wife, Jean (née Simson) Bannerman (1745–1817), who married in 1779. His younger brother, Thomas, was the father of Sir George Bannerman, 10th Baronet and grandfather of Sir Alexander Bannerman, 11th Baronet.

His maternal grandfather was George Simson of Hazlehead. His paternal grandparents were Aberdeen merchant Alexander Bannerman and Margaret (née Burnett) Bannerman. His uncle was Sir Alexander Bannerman, 6th Baronet.

Bannerman was a prominent businessman in his hometown of Aberdeen from where he managed the family wine business. He also had a hand in trading and whaling. Bannerman served as the city's provost and in 1837, was elected dean of Marischal College, Aberdeen.

== Career ==
Alexander Bannerman joined the town council of Aberdeen in 1811. He was a reformer, challenging the long-standing oligarchy led by James and Gavin Hadden, and was instrumental in establishing an elected trust to manage the new Aberdeen Harbour.

In 1832 he became Member of Parliament (MP) for Aberdeen in the House of Commons, sitting as a Radical, and remained an MP until his retirement in 1847. Together with his wife, Margaret Gordon the granddaughter of former Governor Walter Patterson, Bannerman returned to the colony of her birth, when he took up the appointment in 1851 as governor of Prince Edward Island. On this occasion he was made a Knight Bachelor. Bannerman instituted responsible government on the island but was removed in 1854 due to political unrest in which he favoured the Reformers.

He served as governor of the Bahamas until 1857, when he returned north to become governor of Newfoundland.

He served as Newfoundland's governor from 1857 to 1864. He was Newfoundland's second governor since responsible government had been granted.

He clashed with John Kent, the premier of Newfoundland, who he accused of being corrupt. Bannerman accused Kent's government, as did Bishop Mullock, of using relief aid as patronage and also accused Kent of being unreasonable in negotiations with France over the French Shore. Kent accused Bannerman of conspiring with the courts and opposition Conservative Party of Newfoundland to stop a proposal to reduce the salaries of judges, and in 1861 Bannerman dismissed the Kent government and appointed the leader of the opposition, Hugh Hoyles as the new Premier.

Kent's Liberal Party of Newfoundland defeated the Conservative government in a Motion of No Confidence resulting in an election that was fought along sectarian lines with Catholics largely voting Liberal and Protestants largely voting Conservative. The Protestant Conservative Party of Newfoundland narrowly defeated Kent's Liberals. Threats of violence and rioting led to disputed results, with the Conservatives having a majority of only two until in a peaceful by-election, Harbour Grace returned two Conservatives.

Bannerman' initial action in dismissing Kent had been rash and the Colonial Office told him so, but Hoyles, the new Premier, moved towards non-sectarian government, both bishops called for order, and the politics of class replaced the politics of religion. Bannerman resigned as governor in 1864 and returned to England.

== Personal life ==
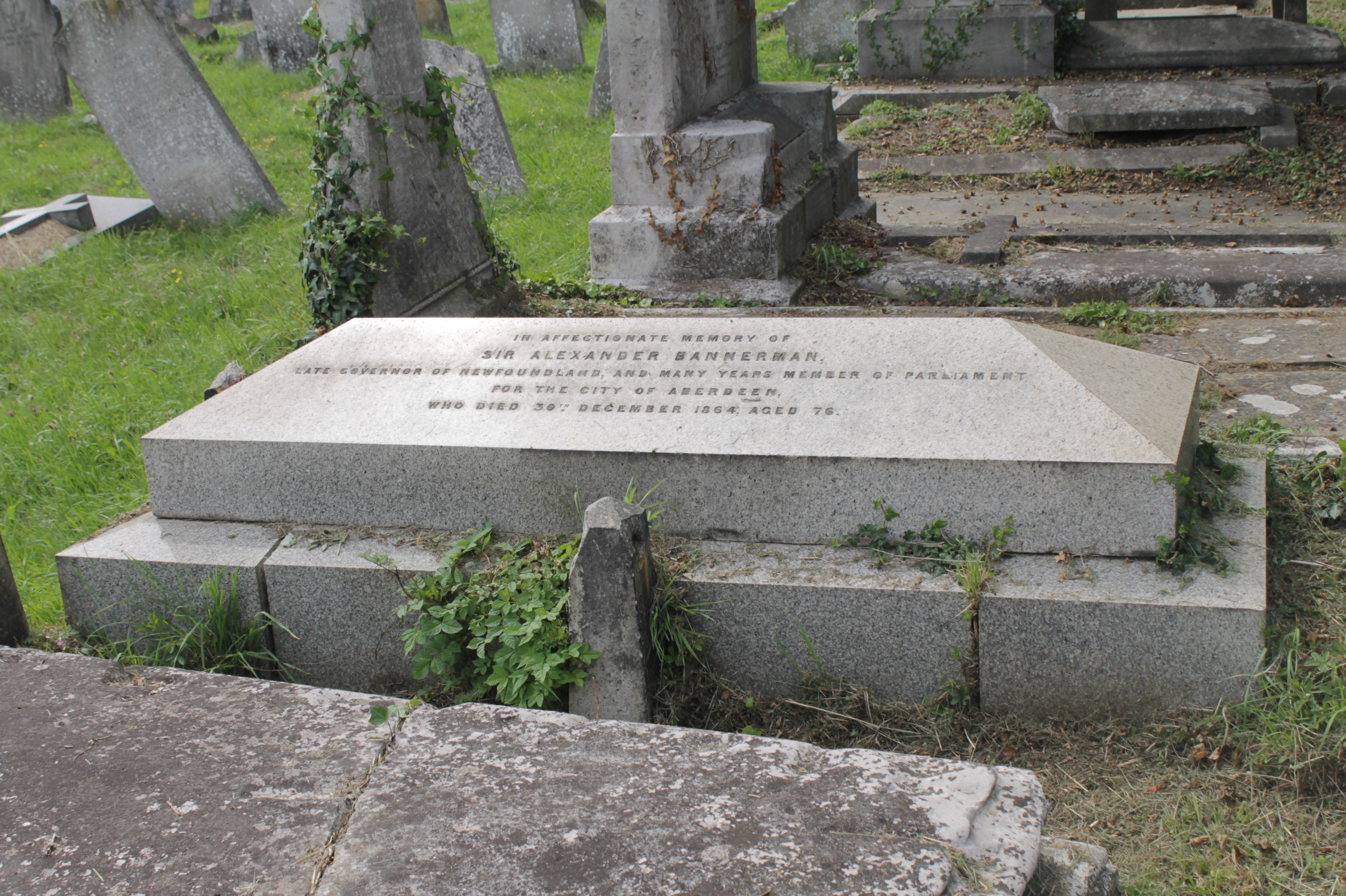
The grave of Sir Alexander Bannerman, Kensal Green Cemetery

In 1825, Bannerman married Margaret Gordon, a daughter of Guthrie Gordon, Esq. Lady Bannerman, as she was known, was born in Charlottetown on Prince Edward Island, and was a granddaughter of Walter Patterson who had been the Island's first governor. She was later identified as "Carlyle's first love" by her biographer, who tells of the young schoolmaster Thomas Carlyle, in Kirkcaldy, Scotland, "who was attracted by her intelligence and wit." Her family considered Carlyle as an unsuitable marriage prospect, and she eventually married Bannerman, a distant cousin.

While in England, he caught a cold and, in his enfeebled state, fell down a flight of stairs causing his death on 30 December 1864 in Mayfair, London aged 76.

He is buried in Kensal Green Cemetery.

=== Legacy ===
Bannerman Park in St. John's commemorates his name in Newfoundland.

Parliament of the United Kingdom
New constituency	Member of Parliament for Aberdeen; 1832–1847	Succeeded by Alexander Fordyce
Government offices
Preceded by Ambrose Lane	Governor of Prince Edward Island; 1851–1854	Succeeded by Dominick Daly
Preceded by John Gregory	Governor of the Bahamas; 1854–1857	Succeeded by Charles John Bayley
Preceded by Sir Charles Henry Darling	Governor of Newfoundland; 1857–1864	Succeeded by Sir Anthony Musgrave
