= Bannerman baronets =

Baronetcy in the Baronetage of Nova Scotia

The Bannerman Baronetcy, of Elsick in the County of Kincardine, is a title in the Baronetage of Nova Scotia. It was created on 28 December 1682 for Alexander Bannerman. The eleventh Baronet was a pioneer military aviator. The twelfth Baronet was a soldier and courtier.

== Bannerman baronets, of Elsick (1682) ==
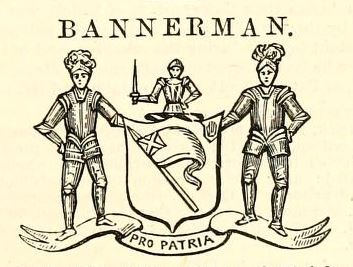
Bannerman Arms

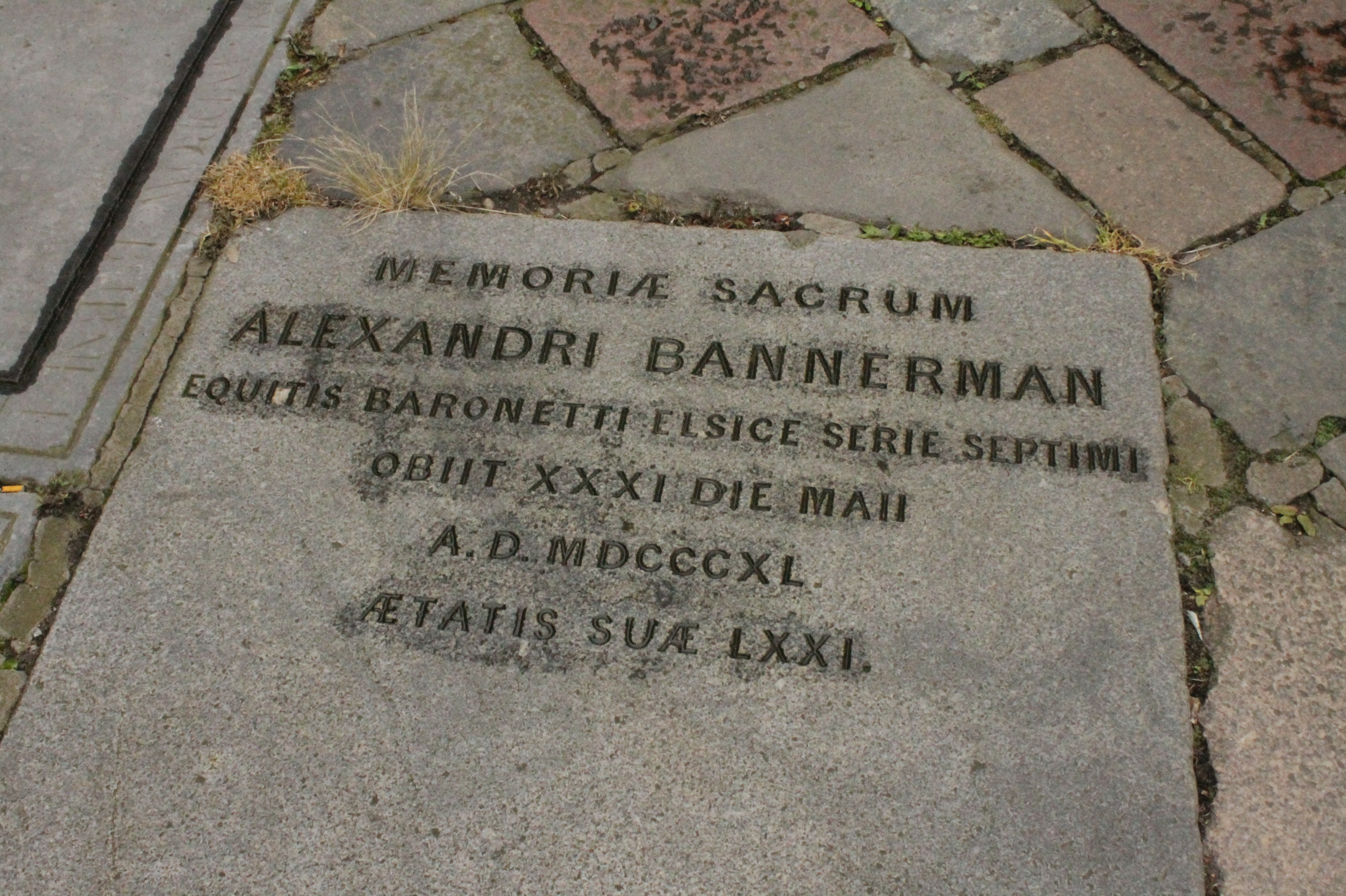
The grave of Sir Alexander Bannerman, 7th Baronet, Kirk of St Nicholas in Aberdeen

- Sir Alexander Bannerman, 1st Baronet (died 1711)
- Sir Alexander Bannerman, 2nd Baronet (died 1742)
- Sir Alexander Bannerman, 3rd Baronet (died 1747)
- Sir Alexander Bannerman, 4th Baronet (died 1770)
- Sir Edward Trotter Bannerman, 5th Baronet (died 1796)
- Sir Alexander Bannerman, 6th Baronet (1741–1813)
- Sir Alexander Bannerman, 7th Baronet (1769–1840)
- Sir Charles Bannerman, 8th Baronet (1782–1851)
- Sir Alexander Bannerman, 9th Baronet (1823–1877)
- Sir George Bannerman, 10th Baronet (1827–1901)
- Sir Alexander Bannerman, 11th Baronet (1871–1934)
- Sir Arthur D'Arcy Gordon Bannerman, 12th Baronet KCVO CIE (1866–1955)
- Sir Donald Arthur Gordon Bannerman, 13th Baronet (1899–1989)
- Sir (Alexander) Patrick Bannerman, 14th Baronet (1933–1989)
- Sir David Gordon Bannerman, 15th Baronet OBE (born 1935)

There is no heir to the baronetcy.

== Bannerman descendants ==
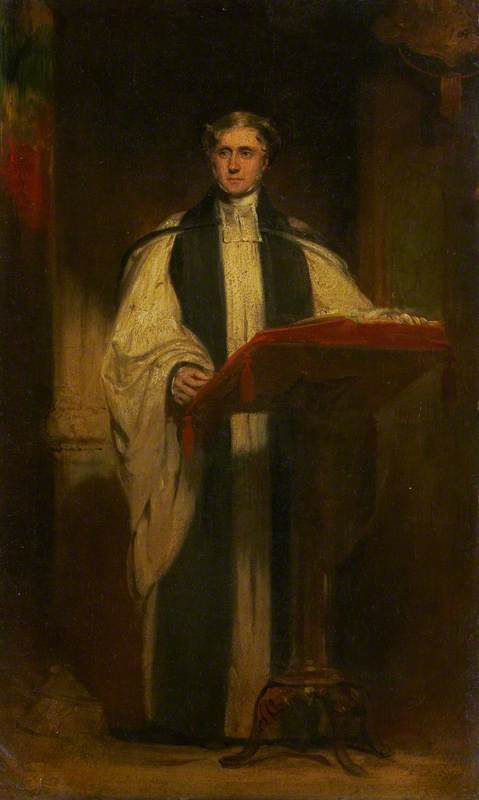
Portrait of the Very Rev. Edward Bannerman Ramsay, Dean of Edinburgh, by John Watson Gordon.

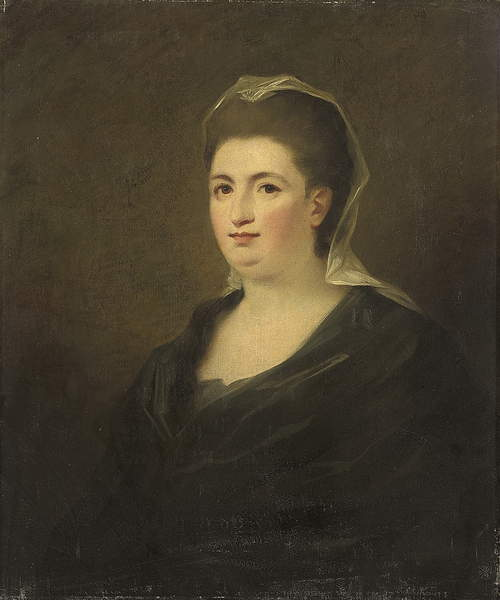
Portrait of Maria (née Bannerman), Countess of Kintore by Henry Raeburn

- Sir Alexander Bannerman, 1st Baronet (died 1711) m. Margaret Scott
  - Sir Alexander Bannerman, 2nd Baronet (died 1742) m. Isabella Macdonald
    - Sir Alexander Bannerman, 3rd Baronet (died 1747) m. Isabella Trotter
      - Sir Alexander Bannerman, 4th Baronet (died 1770) m. Elizabeth Sedgwick
        - Elizabeth Bannerman (d. 1844) m. Sir Alexander Ramsay, 1st Baronet
          - Sir Alexander Ramsay, 2nd Baronet (1785–1852)
          - Thomas Ramsay (1786–1857) m. (1) Jane Cruikshank; m. (2) Margaret Burnett
          - Robert Ramsay (1787–1846) m. (1) Margaret Cruikshank
          - Edward Bannerman Ramsay (1793–1872) m. Isabella Cochrane
          - Sir William Ramsay (1796–1871)
          - Lauderdale Ramsay (1806–1888) m. Sir James Burnett, 10th Baronet
      - Sir Edward Trotter Bannerman, 5th Baronet (died 1796)
  - Sir Patrick Bannerman m. Margaret Maitland
    - Alexander Bannerman (1715–1782) m. Margaret Burnett) (b. 1719)
      - Sir Alexander Bannerman, 6th Baronet (1741–1813)
        - Thomas Bannerman (1768–1813)
        - Sir Alexander Bannerman, 7th Baronet (1769–1840) m. Rachel Irvine
        - Maria Bannerman (1771–1826) m. William Keith-Falconer, 6th Earl of Kintore
        - James Bannerman (1774–1838) m. Helen Burnett (1784–1864)
        - Sir Charles Bannerman, 8th Baronet (1782–1851) m. Anne Bannerman
          - Sir Alexander Bannerman, 9th Baronet (1823–1877) m. (1) Lady Arabella Diana Sackville-West; (2) Lady Katherine Ashburnham
            - Ethel Mary Elizabeth Bannerman (1868–1947) m. Charles Carnegie, 10th Earl of Southesk
              - Lady Katherine Ethel Carnegie (b. 1892) m. Arthur Rivers Bosanquet
              - Charles Carnegie, 11th Earl of Southesk (1893–1992) m. Princess Maud of Fife
              - Hon. Alexander Bannerman Carnegie (b. 1894) m. (1) Susan Ottilia de Rodakowski-Rivers; m. (2) Cynthia Averil Gurney
              - Lady Mary Elizabeth Carnegie (1899–1996) m. Conolly Abel Smith
              - Hon. James Duthac Carnegie (1910–1996) m. Claudia Katharine Angela Blackburn
      - Thomas Bannerman (1743–1820) m. Jane Simson
        - Sir Alexander Bannerman (1788–1864) m. Margaret Gordon
        - Thomas Bannerman (1795–1863) m. Jane Hogarth
          - Sir George Bannerman, 10th Baronet (1827–1901) m. Anne Mary Brooke
            - Sir Alexander Bannerman, 11th Baronet (1871–1934) m. Joan Mary Harford
      - Charles Bannerman (1750–1813) m. Margaret Wilson
        - Patrick Wilson Bannerman (1794–1854) m. Anna Maria Johnston
          - Patrick Wilson Bannerman (1833–1912) m. Flora Lindsay Vanrenen
            - Sir Arthur Bannerman, 12th Baronet (1866–1955) m. (1) Virginia Emilie Bedford; m. (2) Philippa Baumgartner
              - Sir Donald Bannerman, 13th Baronet (1899–1989)
                - Sir Patrick Bannerman, 14th Baronet (1933–1989)
                - Sir David Bannerman, 15th Baronet (born 1935)
        - Margaret Bannerman m. Alexander Forbes
        - Anne Bannerman (d. 1838) m. Sir Charles Bannerman, 8th Baronet

== See also ==
- Elsick House
