= Sir Alexander Bannerman, 11th Baronet =

British military aviator

Sir Alexander Bannerman
- Born: 16 December 1871; Brackley, Northamptonshire, England
- Died: 10 March 1934 (aged 62); George, Cape Province, South Africa
- Military career
- Allegiance: United Kingdom
- Branch: British Army
- Rank: Major
- Commands: School of Ballooning; Air Battalion
- Conflicts: Second Boer War

Major Sir Alexander Bannerman, 11th Baronet (16 December 1871 – 10 March 1934) was a pioneer British military aviator.

Bannerman was born in Brackley in Northamptonshire and educated at Wellington College and subsequently at the Royal Military Academy, Woolwich. He succeeded to the title of 11th Baronet Bannerman, of Elsick in Kincardineshire, on the death of his father the 10th Baronet on 2 December 1901.

Bannerman was commissioned a second lieutenant in the Royal Engineers on 13 August 1891, and promoted to lieutenant on 13 August 1894. He saw active service in the Second Boer War, and was mentioned in Lord Roberts' despatches. Following the end of the war, he was promoted to captain on 22 July 1902.

After the war he returned to the United Kingdom on the SS Orotava which arrived at Southampton in early September 1902, only to depart again in 1903 on a special mission to Japan as British military attache at the Japanese headquarters during the Russo-Japanese War. While there, he observed the use by the Japanese of a tethered balloon at Port Arthur. At the start of 1908, Bannerman was sent to the War Office to work as a general staff officer (third class).

In October 1910, Bannerman left the War Office in order to replace Colonel John Capper as the officer commanding the British Army's School of Ballooning. In April 1911, when the School of Ballooning was reorganized and the Air Battalion was formed within the Royal Engineers, Bannerman served as its commandant. Just before the Air Battalion became the Royal Flying Corps, Bannerman took flying lessons in order to gain his Royal Aero Club certificate.

He had been a balloonist, so had little knowledge of aeroplanes and he is not reckoned as a successful commander of the Air Battalion.

He retired from Royal Engineers and Royal Flying Corps service on 28 August 1912.

Sir Alexander Bannerman died on 10 March 1934 at the age of 62 in George in the Cape Province, South Africa.

== Awards and decorations ==
- Queen's South Africa Medal
- King's South Africa Medal
- 1914–15 Star
- War medal 1915-1918
- Victory Medal
- King George V Coronation Medal
- Mentioned in despatches (Boer War)
- Order of the Rising Sun, 4th class (Japan)
- Order of the Sacred Treasure, 4th class (Japan)
- Russo-Japanese War Medal

Military offices
Preceded by Sir John Capper	Commander of the Balloon School; 1910–1911	Succeeded by Himself; As Commandant of the Air Battalion
Preceded by Himself; As Commander of the Balloon School	Commandant of the Air Battalion; 1911–1912	Succeeded by Sir Frederick Sykes; As Officer Commanding the Military Wing of the Royal Flying Corps
Baronetage of Nova Scotia
Preceded by George Bannerman	Baronet (of Elsick); 1871–1934	Succeeded by Arthur Bannerman
