= Timeline of military aviation =

- 26 June 1794 – The French Aerostatic Corps used a tethered balloon at the Battle of Fleurus as a vantage point.
- 12 July 1849 – In First Italian War of Independence, Austrian forces besieging Venice launched some 200 incendiary balloons, each carrying a 24- to 30-pound bomb that was to be dropped from the balloon with a time fuse over the besieged city. The balloons were launched from land and from the Austrian navy ship SMS Vulcano that acted as a balloon carrier.
- June 1861 – The Union Army Balloon Corps was established during the American Civil War.
- 1878 – The British Army Balloon Equipment Store was established at the Royal Arsenal, Woolwich by the Royal Engineers.
- 1885 – Balloons were deployed by the British Army to Bechuanaland and Suakin.
- 1888 – The British Army School of Ballooning was established.
- 1 August 1907 – The first military air organization, the Aeronautical Division of the U.S. Army Signal Corps, was formed
- 10 September 1907 — British Colonel John Capper flew the military airship Nulli Secundus from Farnborough to Crystal Palace in London.
- 28 June 1909 — The inventors of the first successful aeroplane, the Wright brothers, showcased the prototype Wright Military Flyer to the Aeronautical Division, U.S. Signal Corps.
- 2 August 1909 – Heavier-than-air military aviation was born with the US Signal Corps' purchase of the Wright Military Flyer, renamed "Signal Corps Aeroplane No. 1".
- 14 November 1910 — The first experimental take-off of a heavier-than-air craft from the deck of a US Navy vessel, the cruiser USS Birmingham.
- 22 October 1910 — The Aviation Militaire of the French Army was formed.
- 1 April 1911 — The Air Battalion of the Royal Engineers is formed, the first British heavier-than-air unit.
- 23 October 1911 — Italo-Turkish War, Italian invasion of Libya: Capitan Carlo Piazza flew the first reconnaissance flight in heavier-than-air aircraft, marking the first use in war.
- 1 November 1911 — Italo-Turkish War, Italian invasion of Libya: Lieutenant Giulio Gavotti conducted the first aerial bombardment from an Etrich Taube monoplane
- 4 March 1912 — Italo-Turkish War, Italian invasion of Libya: Lt. Gavotti conducted the first aerial mission at night.
- 13 April 1912 — The Royal Flying Corps was formed.
- 22 September 1912 — Dominion of Australia's Minister for Defence, George Pearce, formed the Australian Flying Corps.
- April 1913 — Mexican Revolution: The Mexican Air Force was established by Secretary of War and Navy General Manuel Mondragón.
- 10 May 1913 — Mexican Revolution: First bombing attack against a naval ship. Didier Masson and Captain Joaquín Bauche Alcalde, flying for Mexican Revolutionist Venustiano Carranza, dropped dynamite bombs on Federalist gunboats at Guaymas, Mexico.
- 1 July 1914 — The Royal Naval Air Service was formed by splitting airship squadrons away from the Royal Flying Corps.
- 6 September 1914 — World War I: The first aircraft raid was launched by the Japanese seaplane carrier Wakamiya on Qingdao.
- 7 September 1914 — World War I, Battle of Galicia: Russian Staff-Captain Pyotr Nesterov became the first pilot engage in aerial combat and achieve a victory, by ramming his Morane-Saulnier Type G into the Austrian Albatros B.II reconnaissance aircraft of pilot Franz Malina and observer Friedrich von Rosenthal.
- 8 September 1914: Malina, Nesterov, and von Rosenthal all died from their injuries of the previous day, becoming the first fatalities of air-to-air combat.
- 5 October 1914 — World War I, aerial combat of 5 October 1914: A French Voisin III biplane armed with a Hotchkiss Mle 1914 machine gun (pilot Joseph Frantz, gunner Louis Quenault) shot down a German Aviatik B.I (pilot Sgt. Wilhelm Schlichting, observer Lt. Fritz von Zangen) over Rheims, France. Marked the first conventional aerial victory, achieved through use of firearms and with the survival of the victors.
- 1 April 1918 — World War I: The Royal Air Force, the world's first independent air force is formed.
- 20 April 1918 — World War I, Battle of the Lys: Captain Manfred von Richthofen ("The Red Baron") claimed his 80th aerial victory. Responsible for just as many fatalities, Richthofen was the deadliest and most successful fighter pilot in the war.
- 21 April 1918 — World War I, Battle of the Lys: Richthofen was killed in aerial combat with the No. 209 Squadron RAF, shot either by Captain Arthur "Roy" Brown or a ground gunner.
- 24 September 1918 — HMS Argus (I49) became the world's first carrier capable of launching and landing naval aircraft after receiving two Sopwith Ship's Strutters.
- 10 July – 31 October 1940 — World War II, Battle of Britain: The first major campaign to hand been fought entirely by air forces.
- 7 December 1941 — World War II, Attack on Pearl Harbor: The Imperial Japanese 1st Air Fleet attacked Naval Station Pearl Harbor, bringing the neutral United States into World War II. 1st Lt. Fusada Iida likely intentionally crashed his downed plane into the USS Curtiss, among the earliest developments of kamikaze tactics.
- 15 June 1944 — World War II: Captain Motoharu Okamura of the 341st Tateyama Kōkūtai proposed official usage of kamikaze by the Japanese Special Attack Units.
- 21 October 1944 — World War II: Three Japanese planes were prepared for the first official suicide attack run on the Leyte Gulf. Two were bombed before take off, and the third piloted by Yoshiyasu Kunō was shot down.
- 25 October 1944 – World War II, Battle of Leyte Gulf: A fiver-person aircraft squadron led by Lt. Yukio Seki conducted the first successful kamikaze mission, damaging the USS Kalinin Bay, USS Kitkun Bay, and USS St. Lo, with Seki sinking the lattermost.
- 8 May 1945 — World War II: Hours before the surrender of Nazi Germany, Erich Hartmann ("The Black Barron") claimed his 352nd aerial victory before being shot down and captured by the US 90th Infantry Division. With 352 confirmed victories and 2 unconfirmed, Hartmann was the most successful fighter pilot in the history of war.
- 6 August 1945 — World War II, Atomic bombing of Hiroshima: The Enola Gay Boeing B-29 Superfortress bomber dropped the "Little Boy" on Hiroshima, Japan. This made the Enola Gay the first of only two aircraft to drop an atomic bomb in warfare, and the attacking vehicle of the deadliest single attack in human history.
- 9 August 1945 — World War II, Atomic bombing of Nagasaki: The Bockscar Boeing B-29 dropped the "Fat Man" on Nagasaki, Japan. This marked second and so-far last deployment of atomic weapons in warfare.
- 24 September 1958 — Second Taiwan Strait Crisis: The first ever air-to-air kill with a missile, when a Chinese Nationalist North American F-86 Sabre shot down a Chinese PLAAF Mikoyan-Guryevich MiG-15.
- November 1980 — Iran–Iraq War: Two Iranian AH-1J SeaCobras downed two Iraqi Mil Mi-25s, marking the first air-to-air helicopter battle. The Iran–Iraq War is the only conflict confirmed to have such engagements.

== See also ==
- History of military ballooning
- List of firsts in aviation
