= Advisory Committee for Aeronautics =

Former UK government legislation

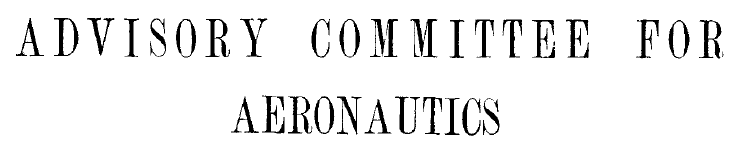

Agency overview
- Formed: 30 April 1909
- Dissolved: 1979
- Jurisdiction: Government of the United Kingdom

Footnotes
- later "Aeronautical Research Committee" then "Aeronautical Research Council", disbanded 1979

The Advisory Committee for Aeronautics (ACA) was a British agency that undertook, promoted, and institutionalised domestic aeronautical research.

ACA was founded on 30 April 1909. Its establishment motivated other countries to create similar agencies, such as the French L’Etablissement Central de l’Aérostation Militaire in Meudon (now ONERA), the Russian "Aerodynamic Institute of Koutchino" and the American National Advisory Committee for Aeronautics. In 1919, it was renamed the Aeronautical Research Committee and started reporting to the Secretary of State for Air. During the interwar period, Henry Tizard joined the Committee; perhaps Tizard's most impactful contribution was his early advocacy for the development and deployment of radar. It reported to the Minister of Aircraft Production during most of the Second World War.

In 1945, the Committee became the Aeronautical Research Council and was subordinated to the Ministry of Supply; this woulld be its last major restructuring. It advised both the Department of Industry and the Ministry of Defence on aeronautical issues and associated scientific research. The Aeronautical Research Council was disbanded in 1980 by the First Thatcher ministry. Some of its military activities were taken over by the Defence Scientific Advisory Council.

== Origins ==
The concept for the creation of the ACA originated with the then Secretary of State for War, R.B.Haldane (later First Viscount Haldane), who was supported in his efforts by the prime minister of the United Kingdom H. H. Asquith. Asquith announced the committee's appointment in a statement to the House of Commons on 5 May 1909, in which he stated:

"With a view to securing that the highest scientific talent shall he brought to hear on the problems which will have to be solved in the course of the work of the two departments, the National Physical Laboratory has been requested to organize at its establishment at Teddington a special department for continuous investigation, experimental and otherwise, of questions which must from time to time be solved to obtain adequate guidance in construction.
"For the superintendence of the investigations at the National Physical Laboratory and general advice on the scientific problems arising in connection with the work of the Admiralty and War Office in aerial construction and navigation, I have appointed a special Committee...."

Haldane was criticised for what some considered the undue preponderance of academics on the committee (seven of the original ten members were Fellows of the premier British learned society for science, the Royal Society, founded in 1660). In response to these criticisms, Asquith replied in the House of Commons:

"It is no part of the general duty of the Advisory Committee For Aeronautics either to construct or invent. Its function is not to initiate, but to consider what is initiated elsewhere, and is referred to it by the executive officers of the Navy and Army Construction Departments. The problems which are likely to arise ... for solutions are numerous, and it will be the work of the Committee to advise on these problems, and to seek their solution by the application of both theoretical and experimental methods of research".

== History ==
Upon its creation, the Advisory Committee For Aeronautics proceeded to coordinate aeronautical research in the following years and produced a series of annual reports, the first of which summarised the purpose of the committee as "the scientific study of the problems of flight, with a view to their practical solution".

Initially, the committee was directly responsible to the Prime Minister, as the sitting chairman of the Committee of Imperial Defence; as such, it did not fall under any department's remit. However, it would reported to the minister that was responsible for governmental research into aeronautics. Funding was sourced from the "Civil Service Estimate".

In 1918, following the creation of the Royal Air Force, the committee's political arrangements changed as part of a wider redistribution of responsibility for government research between the Air Ministry and the Department of Scientific and Industrial Research. It was rebranded as the Aeronautical Research Committee after its remit was expanded and representatives of the aircraft industry were included for the first time. Furthermore, various sub-committees and panels were promptly estabished and the committee started reporting to the Secretary of State for Air.

Between 1910 and 1919, the Committee published Annual Technical Reports (ATRs). In addition, technical papers known as "Reports & Memoranda" (R&M) were produced. The Committee's scope included both military and civil applications.

During the early 1920s, efforts were made to reduce the Committee's expenditure, including by limiting travel and reducing the number of meetings held each year. The Committee issued a written rebuke of excessive cost-cutting, noting that the expense of a single aircraft loss that could have been prevented via greater research would readily cover an entire year of fees.

In light of the deteriorating international situation of the 1930s, the committee was given fresh impetus with the appointment of Sir Henry Tizard. Thereafter, Tizard formed the Committee for the Scientific Survey of Air Defence. One of the committee's most important decisions was to speed the development of a national system of air defence based on radar.

Throughout the majority of the Second World War, the Committee reported to the Minister of Aircraft Production.

In 1945, as part of a post-war reorganisation, the Committee was renamed to the Aeronautical Research Council; it also started reported directly to the Ministry of Supply. It was also decided that the Council would comprise 14 members, 8 of which were catagorised as non-official members. Around this time, the production of annual reports was discontinued, having been replaced by collections of R&Ms, the last issue of which was released in 1972.

Throughout its latter years, the Council provided independent advice to both the Department of Industry and the Ministry of Defence on matters related to aeronautics, research programmes, and related scientific activities.

In April 1980, the Aeronautical Research Council was one of over 500 non-departmental public bodies that were abolished around the start of this decade by the First Thatcher ministry. Some of its activities were taken up by the Defence Scientific Advisory Council, a primarily consultative body.

A brief history of the committee during its seventy years of existence is maintained online by Cranfield University, which also maintain an archive of the R&M series, which shows the many aspects of aviation which were the subject of research during the period.

=== Initial members of the Committee ===
From the time of its appointment on 30 April 1909 until the publication of its first report, the committee's members were as follows:

Committee members
Committee member	Title
John Strutt, 3rd Baron Rayleigh	President
Dr. Richard T. Glazebrook	Chairman, Director of the National Physical Laboratory
Major-General Sir Charles Hadden	Army representative
Rear-Admiral Reginald Bacon	Naval representative
Alfred G. Greenhill	previously Professor of Mathematics, Manchester University
Dr Napier Shaw	Director of the Meteorological Office
Horace Darwin (Note: son of Charles Darwin)	precision instrument-making
Joseph Petavel	Professor of Engineering, Manchester University
Arnulph Mallock	consulting engineer, scientific instrument designer
Dr. Frederick W. Lanchester	Polymath, engineer and automotive expert
Mervyn O'Gorman	Superintendent of the Army Balloon Factory
Captain Murray Sueter (Note: later Fifth Sea Lord with responsibility for naval aviation)	Naval representative

== Publications ==
The committee and its successor agencies published several series of reports which could be purchased from HMSO:

- Annual Reports (the first covering the year from 1909 to 1910)
- Technical Reports
- Reports and Memoranda (referred to as R&Ms).
- Current Papers (starting in 1950 with No. 1)

An index to R&Ms was issued periodically e.g. R&M 2750 published in 1956, covering papers from the late 1940s onwards (Index issues' R&M numbers were generally assigned with the last two digits being '50': this system was also adopted for Current Papers, starting with CP No. 50).
