= Aerial warfare =

Military combat involving aircraft

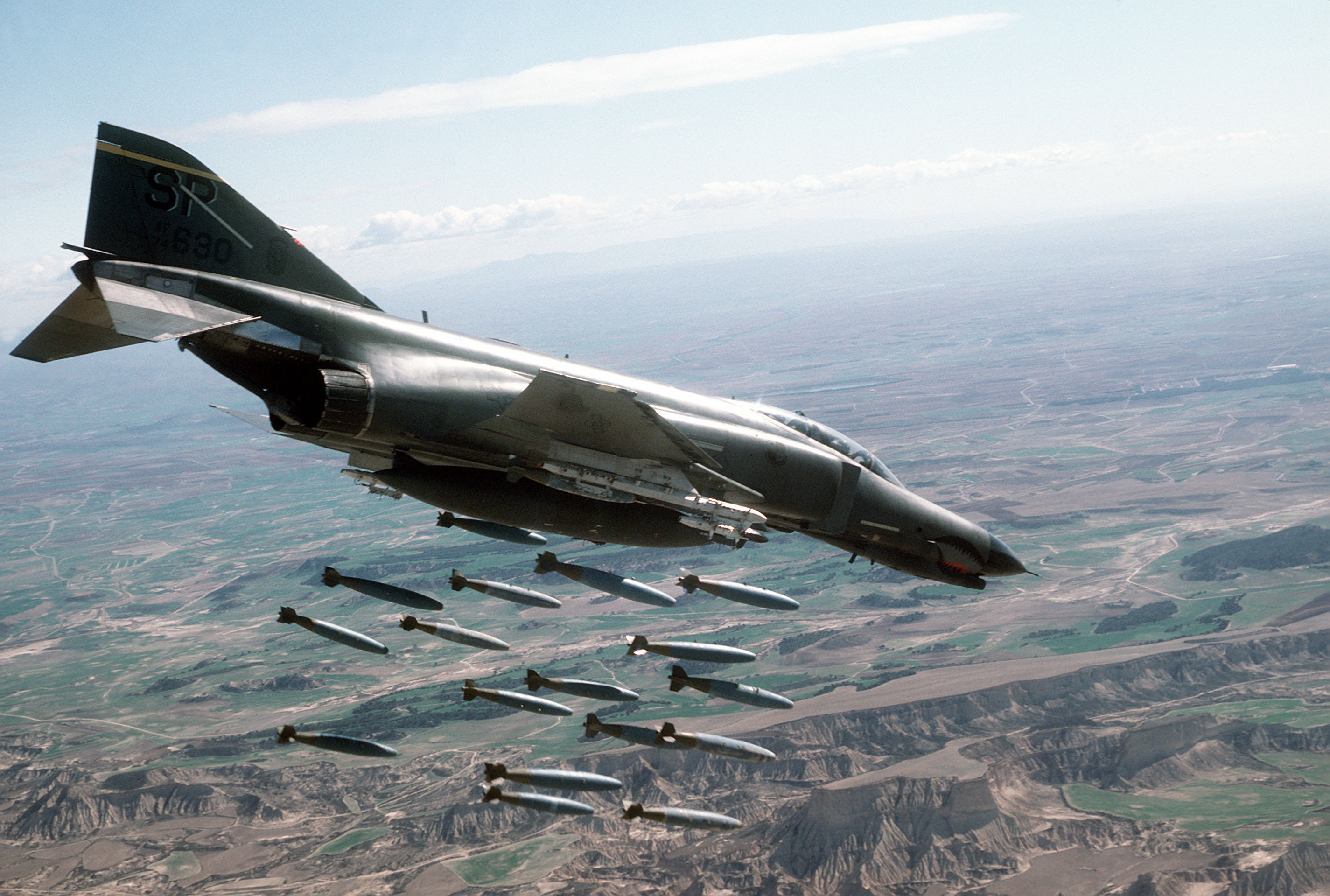
A United States Air Force F-4 Phantom II releasing aerial bombs over a bombing range in Bardenas Reales, Spain in 1986

Aerial warfare is the use of military aircraft and other flying machines in warfare. Aerial warfare includes bombers attacking enemy installations or a concentration of enemy troops or strategic targets; fighter aircraft battling for control of airspace; attack aircraft engaging in close air support against ground targets; naval aviation flying against sea and nearby land targets; gliders, helicopters and other aircraft to carry airborne forces such as paratroopers; aerial refueling tankers to extend operation time or range; and military transport aircraft to move cargo and personnel.

Historically, military aircraft have included lighter-than-air balloons carrying artillery observers; lighter-than-air airships for bombing cities; various sorts of reconnaissance, surveillance, and early warning aircraft carrying observers, cameras, and radar equipment; torpedo bombers to attack enemy vessels; and military air-sea rescue aircraft for saving downed airmen. Modern aerial warfare includes missiles and unmanned aerial vehicles. Surface forces are likely to respond to enemy air activity with anti-aircraft warfare.

== History ==
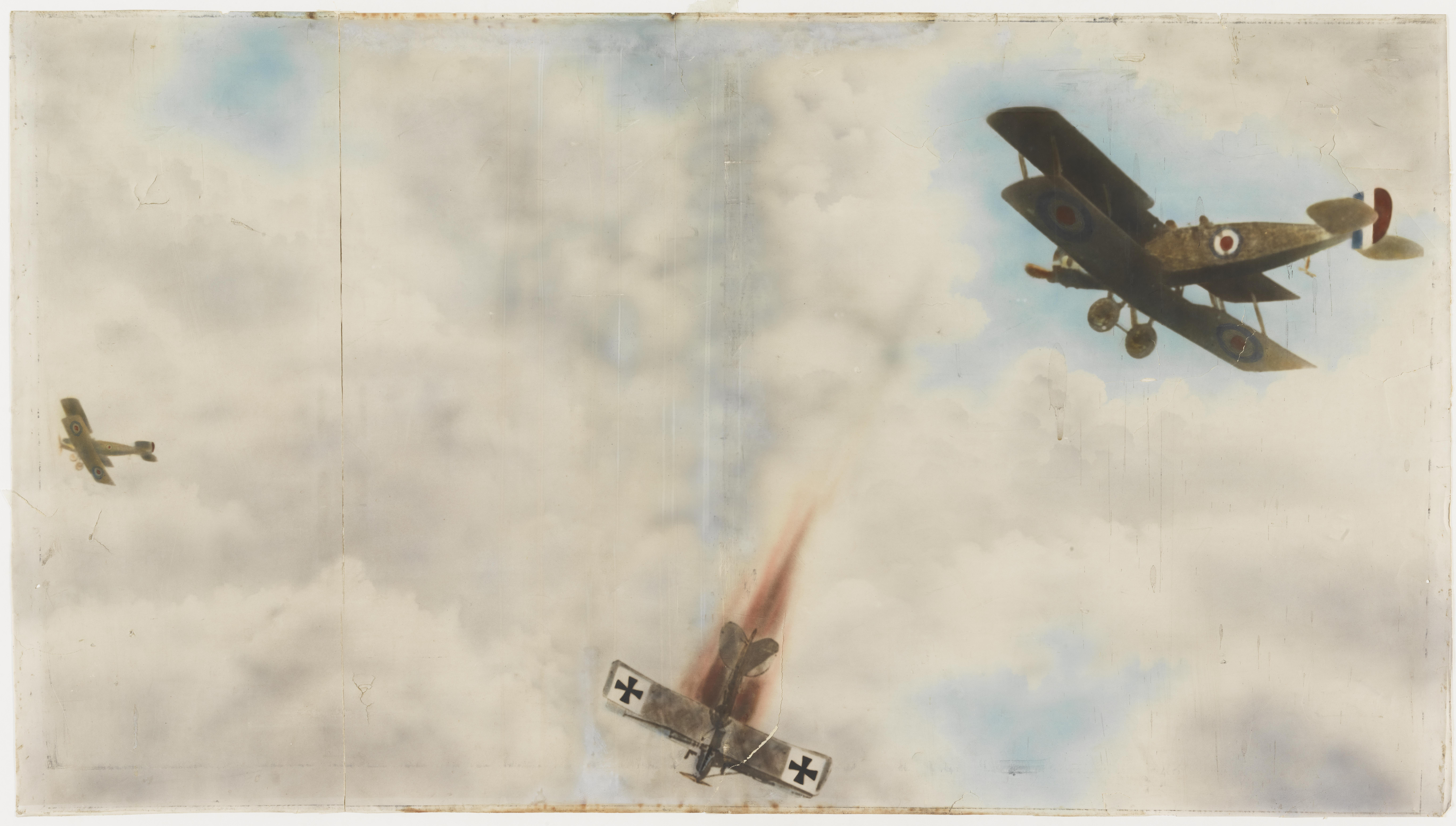
World War I fighter planes over Europe, 1915–1918

The history of aerial warfare began in ancient times, with the use of man-carrying kites in Ancient China. In the third century it progressed to balloon warfare. Airships (notably zeppelins) served in military use in the early years of the 20th century.

Heavier-than-air airplanes first went to war in the Italo-Turkish War in 1911, initially for aerial reconnaissance, and then for aerial combat to shoot down enemy reconnaissance planes. Aircraft continued to carry out these roles during World War I (1914-1918), where the use of planes and zeppelins for strategic bombing also emerged. The rise of fighter aircraft and of air-to-air combat led to a realisation of the desirability of achieving air superiority. Closer integration of attacking aircraft with ground operations ("battlefield support") also developed during World War I.

During World War II (1939-1945), the use of strategic bombing increased, while airborne forces, missiles, and early precision-guided munitions were introduced. Aircraft carriers gained particular importance in the trans-oceanic projection of air power.

Ballistic missiles became of key importance during the Cold War, were armed with nuclear warheads, and were stockpiled by the United States and the Soviet Union to deter each other from using them.

Drone warfare using relatively cheap unmanned equipment proliferated in the 21st century, particularly after the start of the Second Nagorno-Karabakh War in 2020.

== Aerial reconnaissance ==
Aerial reconnaissance is reconnaissance for a military or strategic purpose that is conducted using reconnaissance aircraft. This role can fulfil a variety of requirements, including the collection of imagery intelligence, observation of enemy maneuvers and artillery spotting.

== Air combat manoeuvring ==
Air combat manoeuvring (also known as ACM or dogfighting) is the tactical art of moving, turning and situating a fighter aircraft in order to attain a position from which an attack can be made on another aircraft. It relies on offensive and defensive basic fighter manoeuvring (BFM) to gain an advantage over an aerial opponent.

== Airborne forces ==
Airborne forces are military units, usually light infantry, set up to be moved by aircraft and "dropped" into battle, typically by parachute. Thus, they can be placed behind enemy lines, and have the capability to deploy almost anywhere with little warning. The formations are limited only by the number and size of their aircraft, so given enough capacity a huge force can appear "out of nowhere" in minutes, an action referred to as vertical envelopment.

Conversely, airborne forces typically lack the supplies and equipment for prolonged combat operations, and are therefore more suited for airhead operations than for long-term occupation; furthermore, parachute operations are particularly sensitive to adverse weather conditions. Advances in helicopter technology since World War II have brought increased flexibility to the scope of airborne operations, and air assaults have largely replaced large-scale parachute operations, and (almost) completely replaced combat glider operations.

== Airstrike ==
An airstrike or air strike is an offensive operation carried out by attack aircraft. Air strikes are mostly delivered from aircraft such as fighters, bombers, ground attack aircraft, and attack helicopters. The official definition includes all sorts of targets, including enemy air targets, but in popular use the term is usually narrowed to a tactical (small-scale) attack on a ground or naval objective. Weapons used in an airstrike can range from machine gun bullets and missiles to various types of bombs. It is also commonly referred to as an air raid.

In close air support, air strikes are usually controlled by trained observers for coordination with friendly ground troops in a manner derived from artillery tactics.

== Strategic bombing ==
Strategic bombing is a military strategy used in a total war with the goal of defeating the enemy by destroying their morale or their economic ability to produce and transport materiel to the theatres of military operations, or both. It is a systematically organized and executed attack from the air which can utilize strategic bombers, long- or medium-range missiles, or nuclear-armed fighter-bomber aircraft to attack targets deemed vital to the enemy's war-making capability.

== Anti-aircraft warfare ==
Anti-aircraft warfare or counter-air defence is defined by NATO as "all measures designed to nullify or reduce the effectiveness of hostile air action." They include ground and air-based weapon systems, associated sensor systems, command and control arrangements and passive measures (e.g. barrage balloons). It may be used to protect naval, ground, and air forces in any location. However, for most countries the main effort has tended to be 'homeland defence'. NATO refers to airborne air defence as counter-air and naval air defence as anti-aircraft warfare. Missile defence is an extension of air defence as are initiatives to adapt air defence to the task of intercepting any projectile in flight.

== Missiles ==
In modern usage, a missile is a self-propelled precision-guided munition system, as opposed to an unguided self-propelled munition, referred to as a rocket (although these too can also be guided). Missiles have four system components: targeting and/or missile guidance, flight system, engine, and warhead. Missiles come in types adapted for different purposes: surface-to-surface and air-to-surface missiles (ballistic, cruise, anti-ship, anti-tank, etc.), surface-to-air missiles (and anti-ballistic), air-to-air missiles, and anti-satellite weapons. All known existing missiles are designed to be propelled during powered flight by chemical reactions inside a rocket engine, jet engine, or other type of engine. Non-self-propelled airborne explosive devices are generally referred to as shells and usually have a shorter range than missiles.

In ordinary British-English usage predating guided weapons, a missile is "any thrown object", such as objects thrown at players by rowdy spectators at a sporting event.

== UAVs ==
The advent of the unmanned aerial vehicle has dramatically revolutionised aerial warfare with multiple nations developing and/or purchasing UAV fleets. Several benchmarks have already occurred, including a UAV-fighter jet dogfight, probes of adversary air defense with UAVs, replacement of an operational flight wing's aircraft with UAVs, control of UAVs qualifying the operator for 'combat' status, UAV-control from the other side of the world, jamming and/or data-hijacking of UAVs in flight, as well as proposals to transfer fire authority to AI aboard a UAV. UAVs have quickly evolved from surveillance to combat roles.

The growing capability of UAVs has thrown into question the survivability and capability of manned fighter jets.

== See also ==
- Aerial bombing of cities
- Air force
- Airlift
- Airstrike
- Dogfight
- Loss of Strength Gradient
- Timeline of military aviation
