= James Templer (balloon aviator) =

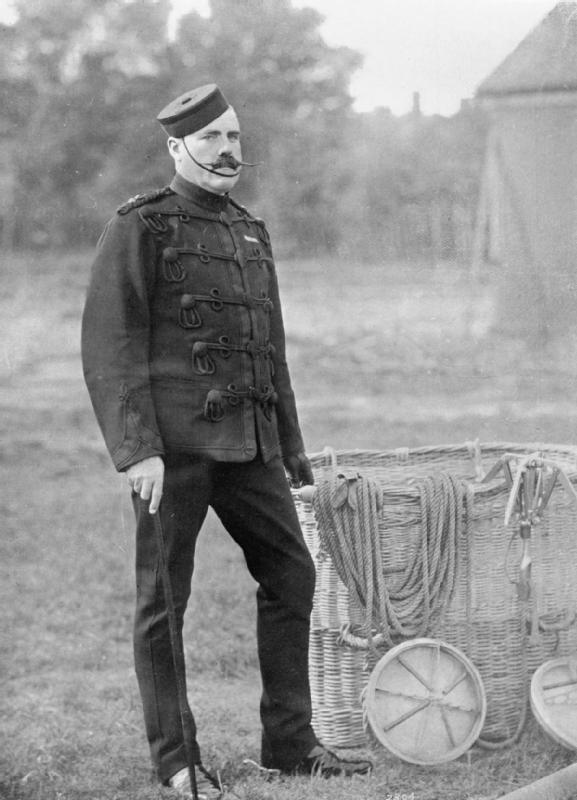
- Born: 27 May 1846; Greenwich, Kent, England
- Died: 2 January 1924; Lewes, Sussex, England
- Military career
- Allegiance: United Kingdom
- Branch: British Army
- Rank: Colonel
- Units: King's Royal Rifle Corps; Royal Engineers
- Conflicts: Second Boer War

Colonel James Lethbridge Brooke Templer (27 May 1846 – 2 January 1924) was an early British military pioneer of balloons. He was an officer in the King's Royal Rifle Corps and Royal Engineers. Templer set out a scientific foundation for British military ballooning. In particular, he worked out routines for balloon handling, how to use hydrogen in cylinders and methods for training observers.

== Biography ==
James Templer was the son of John Templer. He was educated at Harrow and Trinity College, Cambridge. Whilst serving in the King's Royal Rifle Corps Templer became interested in military ballooning.

In 1878 Captain Templer and Captain Charles Moore Watson started the first regular British Army balloon school at Woolwich. The school was started with Templer's own balloon, the Crusader. At the same time, Templer was appointed Instructor in Ballooning to the Royal Engineers. The following year Captain Templer took command of the newly established military balloon department at Chatham.

On 10 December 1881 Captain Templer was accompanied by Walter Powell the MP for Malmesbury and Mr. A. Agg-Gardner, brother of James Agg-Gardner – then between terms as MP for Cheltenham – in the balloon Saladin. The group departed Bath and headed towards Dorset. In time they found themselves within half a mile of the sea near Eypesmouth which is to the west of Bridport. As the balloon was rapidly drifting seaward, they attempted to descend. The balloon touched the ground a mere 150 yards from the cliff edge. The balloon dragged along and ground and Templer exited the basket holding the valve line in his hand. As the balloon had just been lightened, it rose about eight feet and Agg-Gardner jumped out breaking his leg. Powell was now the only occupant of the balloon. Templer, who had still hold of the line, shouted to Powell to climb down the line. Powell made a move for the rope but the balloon rose, tearing the line out of Templer's hands. The balloon climbed rapidly and Powell was taken out to sea. He was never seen again.

In February 1885, Templer was promoted to the rank of major. During the British Army's expedition to the Sudan in 1885, Templer took three balloons. He was mentioned in despatches for his actions during the Hasheen engagement.

In 1888 Templer was accused, arrested and charged with providing the Italian Government with British secrets about military ballooning. The case was found to be without foundation and Templer was honourably acquitted.

At the start of the Second Boer War (1899–1902), Templer served in the Scientific and Departmental Corps as a lieutenant colonel. He was promoted to full colonel in the Reserve of Officers on 6 December 1899, and was able to put his interest in steam traction to use when he served as Director of Steam Road Transport during the war. He was mentioned in despatches (29 November 1900) by Lord Roberts, Commander-in-Chief during the early part of the War. After the end of the war, Templer retired from his commission in the 7th (Militia) Battalion of the King's Royal Rifle Corps in November 1902.

The Airship Nulli Secundus, 1907

In 1902, Templer decided that it was time to construct a British military airship. Under Templer's direction, in 1905 the Balloon Factory relocated to Farnborough. where work could be started on an airship shed. This, and a shortage of money, delayed the project. Work on the British Army Dirigible No 1, named Nulli Secundus ("Second to none") was not complete until 1907 by which time Templer was no longer the superintendent of the Balloon Factory, Colonel Capper having taken over in 1906.

Templer continued as the superintendent of the Balloon Factory until retiring from service in 1908.

He died at Laughton Grange in the Sussex town of Lewes on 2 January 1924.

== Family ==
Templer married Florence Henrietta Gilliat at Chorley Wood in Watford on 12 January 1889. Their daughter Ursula Florence Templer was born in London the following year on 29 August 1890.

Military offices
New title School established	Superintendent of the Balloon School; Initially with Capt C M Watson; 1878–1906	Succeeded by J E Capper
