= Richard Glazebrook =

British physicist (1854–1935)

Sir Richard Glazebrook KCB KCVO FRS
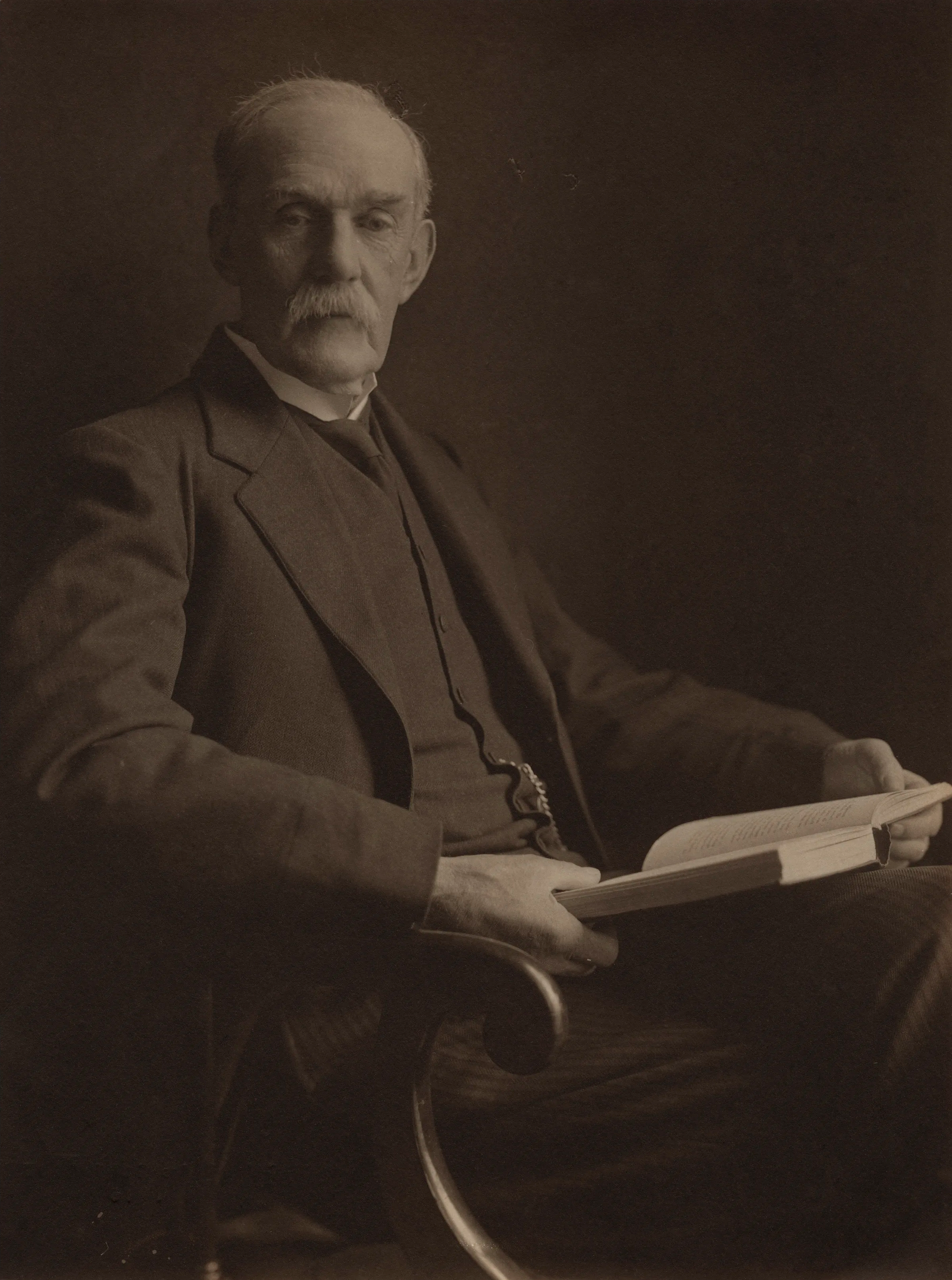
- Portrait by Olive Edis, c. 1915
- Born: Richard Tetley Glazebrook; 18 September 1854; West Derby, Liverpool, England
- Died: 15 December 1935 (aged 81); Limpsfield, Surrey, England
- Awards: The William Hopkins Prize (1882); Hughes Medal (1909); Albert Medal (1918); Royal Medal (1931)
- Scientific career
- Fields: Physics

1st Director of NPL
- In office 1900–1919
- Preceded by: Office established
- Succeeded by: Joseph Ernest Petavel

Sir Richard Tetley Glazebrook KCB KCVO FRS (18 September 1854 – 15 December 1935) was an English physicist.

== Education and early career ==
Glazebrook was born in West Derby, Liverpool, Lancashire, the son of a surgeon. He was educated at Dulwich College until 1870, Liverpool College from 1870 to 1872, and Trinity College, Cambridge, from which he graduated in Mathematics in 1876 and of which he was elected a fellow in 1877. He studied physics under James Clerk Maxwell and Lord Rayleigh at the new Cavendish Laboratory and, in 1880, was appointed a demonstrator at the laboratory.

The following year (1881), he was also appointed a college lecturer in mathematics and physics and a university lecturer in mathematics. His research focused on electrical standards and aviation. When defining electrical standards for the unit of resistance, the British Science Association were trying to determine what length a mercury column should be, to express the absolute value of the Ohm. A number of different values had been obtained over the years and Glazebrook determined the value at 106.3 cm.

Despite skepticism of mercurial standards this was the International value agreed on later by the 1893 Chicago conference.

== Later career ==
He hoped to succeed Rayleigh as Cavendish Professor of Physics in 1884, but was surprisingly (given that he was also Rayleigh's choice) passed over in favour of Sir J.J. Thomson, which was a great disappointment to him. He was, however, appointed Assistant Director of the Cavendish in 1891 and Bursar of Trinity College in 1895. In 1898, he was appointed Principal of University College, Liverpool.

In June 1899, however, he left to become first Director of the National Physical Laboratory (NPL) in Teddington. During the First World War, he chaired the government's Advisory Committee for Aeronautics, located at the NPL, under the presidency of John Strutt, Lord Rayleigh.

He held his post at the NPL until his retirement (largely due to friction with the Department of Scientific and Industrial Research) in 1919, successfully establishing the NPL as a world leader in physics research.

== Retirement ==
Following his retirement, he moved back to Cambridge and edited the Dictionary of Applied Physics. From 1920 to 1923, he was Zaharoff Professor of Aviation and Director of the Department of Aeronautics at Imperial College, London. He remained on the General Board of the NPL and chaired the Executive Committee from 1925 to 1932.

== Honours and awards ==
In 1882, he was elected a Fellow of the Royal Society (FRS) at the very young age of 28. He was elected an International Member of the American Philosophical Society in 1895. He served as Vice-President of the Royal Society in 1919–1920 and 1924–1928, and as its Foreign Secretary from 1926 to 1929. He was awarded the Hughes Medal in 1909 and the Royal Medal in 1931.

He was also awarded the Albert Medal of the Royal Society of Arts in 1918, and the Gold Medal of the Royal Aeronautical Society in 1933.

He was President of the Physical Society, later the Institute of Physics, from 1903 to 1905, and president of the Institution of Electrical Engineers in 1906.

Glazebrook was appointed Companion of the Order of the Bath (CB) in 1910, was knighted in 1917, and appointed Knight Commander of the Order of the Bath (KCB) in the 1920 New Year War Honours and Knight Commander of the Royal Victorian Order (KCVO) in 1934.

== Personal life ==
He married Frances Gertrude Atkinson of Leeds in 1883; they had a son and three daughters. He died at Limpsfield, Surrey, on 15 December 1935, aged 81.

== Works ==
- A dictionary of applied physics (5 vols.) edited by Richard Glazebrook I. Mechanics, engineering, heat; II. Electricity; III. Meteorology, metrology; IV. Light, sound, radiology, aeronautics, metallurgy. General Index (London : Macmillan, 1922–1923)
- Mechanics Dynamics (Cambridge University Press, 1911)
- Mechanics Hydrostatics (Cambridge University Press, 1916)
- Physical optics (London, New York: Longmans, Green, 1886)
- Laws and properties of matter (London, K. Paul, Trench, Trübner & co., ltd., 1893)
- Heat: an elementary text-book, theoretical and practical, for colleges and schools (Cambridge University Press, 1894)
- Light, an elementary text-book, theoretical and practical (Cambridge University Press, 1912)
- Electricity and magnetism. An elementary text-book, theoretical and practical (Cambridge University Press, 1903)
- Practical physics (London, Longmans, 1889)
- James Clerk Maxwell and modern physics (New York: Macmillan, 1896)
- Science And Industry The Rede Lecture 1917 (Cambridge University Press)
