= School of Ballooning =

Early aeronautical military training institution

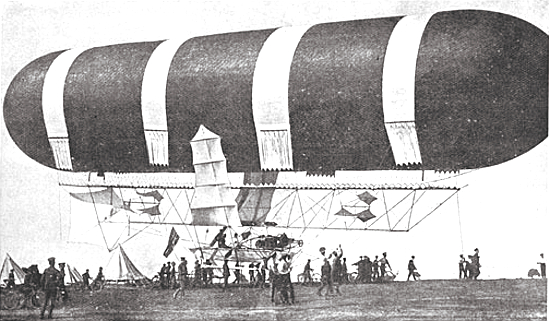
Nulli Secundus

The School of Ballooning was a training and test centre for British Army experiments with balloons and airships. It was established at Chatham in Kent in 1888. The school moved to Stanhope Lines, Aldershot in 1890 when a balloon section and depot were formed as permanent units of the Royal Engineers establishment. The school was sometimes known as the Balloon Factory.

== Origins ==
In 1862 two Royal Engineers officers, who had seen balloons being used in the American Civil War, drew the attention of the War Office to the potential use of balloons for observation. These officers demonstrated balloons to the army, but it was only in 1878 that the War Office directed Captain James Templer, an army reservist and experienced balloonist, to set up a small unit of Royal Engineers which became known as the School of Ballooning.

== History ==
=== At Woolwich ===
Initially the school was based at the Royal Arsenal, Woolwich. In 1878 the school constructed and flew a hydrogen-filled balloon of 10,000 cubic feet (280 m^{3}) capacity. By 1879 the unit had five balloons. In 1880 military balloon training and demonstration took place at Aldershot. After a tragic incident in 1881 Templer concentrated on development of balloons rather than making ascents himself.

=== At Chatham ===
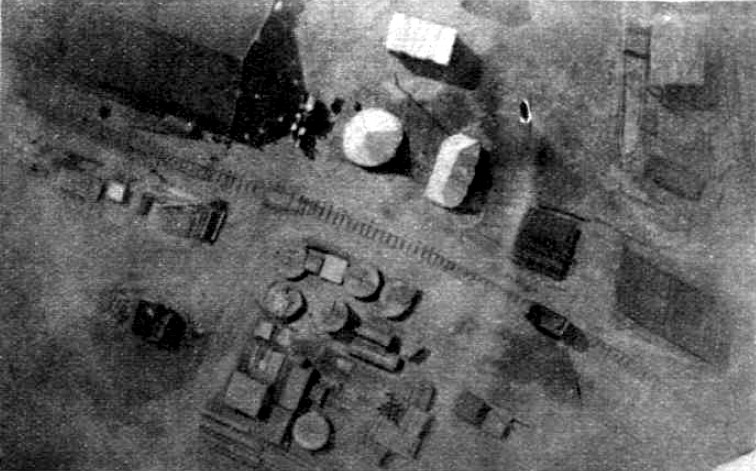
An 1886 aerial photograph by Major Henry Elsdale of the Balloon School camp at Lydd, Kent

In 1882 the school moved to the School of Military Engineering at Chatham where they discovered that Goldbeater's skin was superior balloon fabric than the material they had used previously – in particular it was easier to stow for transport. Templer also took out a patent for the use of unmanned balloons for "balloon photography" of the ground below.

Templer collaborated in a series of successful unmanned balloon photography experiments, which Major Henry Elsdale conducted in Halifax, Nova Scotia in 1882 and 1883. Elsdale would continue those experiments in map-accurate aerial photography through the 1880s, after he returned to England.

=== At Aldershot ===
In 1890 the school moved to Aldershot where a section of the Royal Engineers had been formed to use balloons operationally. The School of Ballooning was renamed the Balloon Factory in 1897. In 1899 the Factory increased production to supply balloons for use in the Boer War. The factory began experiments with "dirigible balloons" (airships) in 1902.

=== At Farnborough ===
The Aldershot site was found to be too enclosed so in 1904-1906 the factory moved to a site at the edge of Farnborough Common. A 72 feet (22 m) high airship shed was built at there. Samuel Cody experimented with man-lifting kites at the site. In 1906 he was appointed as Chief Instructor in Kiting.

In 1906 Colonel John Capper took up command of the School of Ballooning. During his time in command, Capper contributed to the development of Britain's military airships and, with Cody, piloted the first successful British airship flight, that of the Nulli Secundus over London during 1907.

In 1909–1911, part of the factory was separated to form the Air Battalion of the Royal Engineers. In 1912 the Balloon Factory was renamed the Royal Aircraft Factory.

== Commanders ==
The following officers served as superintendent of the Balloon Factory:

- 1878 to ?, Captain J. L. B. Templer
- 1901 to May 1906 Colonel J. L. B. Templer
- 1906 to 1909, Colonel J. E. Capper

In 1909, the Balloon Factory was separated from the Balloon School. Colonel Capper continued as commander of the Balloon School, and the civilian consultant engineer Mervyn O'Gorman was appointed superintendent of the Balloon Factory. Several months later Major Sir Alexander Bannerman took over the Balloon School from Colonel Capper.
