= Mervyn O'Gorman =

English engineer (1871–1958)

Mervyn O'Gorman CB
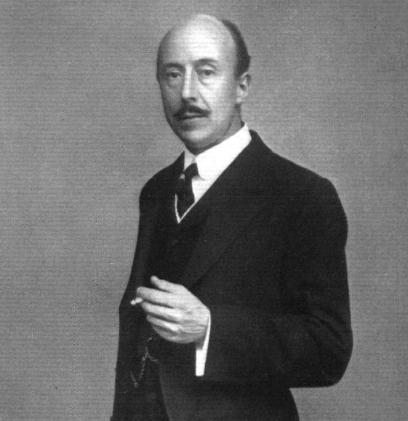
- O'Gorman in 1912
- Born: Mervyn Joseph Pius Gorman; 19 December 1871; Brighton, England
- Died: 16 March 1958 (aged 86); London
- Occupations: Electrical and aeronautical engineer
- Known for: Director of Royal Aircraft Factory (1909–16)

Mervyn Joseph Pius O'Gorman CB (19 December 1871 – 16 March 1958) was a British electrical and aircraft engineer. After working as an electrical engineer, he was appointed Superintendent of what became the Royal Aircraft Factory at Farnborough in Hampshire in 1909. In 1916, following a scandal over the quality of the aircraft used by the Royal Flying Corps, he was removed from this post but continued to act in an advisory capacity. After the war he concentrated his energies on motoring issues, particularly road safety and traffic management, and played an important part in the publication of the Highway Code. He died in 1958 in Chelsea, London.

== Birth and early life ==
Mervyn Gorman was born in Brighton on 19 December 1871, the son of Edmund Anthony Gorman (1821-1912) and his third wife Margaret Eliza Barclay Crawford (1849-1899). Later in life, Mervyn readopted the O' prefix to his surname, which had been dropped by his Irish great-grandfather Thomas O'Gorman (1724–1800) after he moved to England in 1747.

Sources give various addresses for Mervyn's father: East Bergholt, Suffolk; Harrogate, Yorkshire; and Monamore, County Clare, Ireland.

His younger brother was Cecil Carleton Crawford O'Gorman, a mining engineer and painter who lived in Mexico.

Mervyn was educated at St Edmund's College, Ware, at Downside School and at University College, Dublin, where he read classics and science.

== Early career ==
In 1891 O'Gorman went to London to study electrical engineering at the City and Guilds Central Institution. He was elected an associate member of the Institution of Mechanical Engineers in 1893, and obtained his City and Guilds diploma in 1894, his marks being amongst the best in his year. On graduating he obtained a position as an assistant engineer at the Fowler, Waring Cables Company, and was sent to take charge of the company's cable networks in Ostend and Grenoble. Back in England he assisted with the laying of 3000 volt systems in Salford, Leicester and Taunton, and took part in experiments on the use of celluloid as an insulator. He was rapidly promoted to chief engineer, and reorganised the company's factory near London before being sent to Paris in 1895 to set up a new cable factory for a French company; in 1896 he became Fowler Waring's general manager. In 1898 Fowler Waring became part of Western Electric and O'Gorman left the company and started an engineering consultancy at 66 Victoria Street, London in partnership with E. H. Cozens-Hardy. The partnership was brought to an end in October 1908 when Cozens-Hardy left London for St Helens to take a place on the board of the glass manufacturers Pilkingtons. O'Gorman was a keen motorist, being an active member of the Automobile Club of Great Britain and Ireland, and he published a book on the subject, O'Gorman's Motoring Pocket Book, in 1904; he also wrote articles on motoring for The Times. In August 1908 at a race meeting at Brooklands, the mechanic accompanying one of the racers in the first O'Gorman Trophy race was killed in an accident after a Mercedes two-seater was taken high up on the banks to pass another car - both going at speed. The Mercedes lost control and careened across the track ejecting both occupants resulting in the death of the 21 year old mechanic.

== Royal Aircraft Factory ==
In 1909 R. B. Haldane, then Secretary of State for War, selected O'Gorman as the person who would bring his vision of order and scientific discipline to the development of military aviation. As a part of this programme, the Balloon Factory at Farnborough was to be removed from the military and placed under civilian scientific administration. In October 1909 O'Gorman was appointed as the first civilian Superintendent of the Balloon Factory. He replaced Col. John Capper, who retained his command of the Army Balloon School also located there.

When O'Gorman took over the Balloon Factory, official interest was still focussed on lighter-than-air flight. Some highly secret experiments had been conducted by J. W. Dunne at Blair Atholl, and S. F. Cody had built and flown the British Army Aeroplane No 1, but all funding had been withdrawn from both of these projects in April 1909. The British Army Airship No.2 was then under construction at the Balloon Factory.

The new system, under which O'Gorman reported directly to the Master-General of the Ordnance at the War Office, was intended to bypass military traditionalists, many of whom failed to see any military value in aircraft of any description. The purpose of what was to become known as the Royal Aircraft Factory was to be research, carried out in conjunction with the National Physical Laboratory at Teddington. (The title Royal Aircraft Factory is misleading since it was never the intention to mass produce aircraft; rather, research would be carried out, leading to designs which would be manufactured by private companies.)

O'Gorman devised a system of categorising aircraft according to their layout. Pusher configuration aircraft with a forward elevator in addition to a rear-mounted tailplane and rudder carried on booms were designated as Farman Type, after the highly successful and widely imitated Farman III. Canard configuration aircraft became Santos Type, after Alberto Santos Dumont's 14-bis aircraft, and tractor configuration aircraft were designated Blériot Type after Louis Blériot's Type XI, a system set forth in an article entitled Some Problems in Aircraft Design published in Flight in 1911. Accordingly De Havilland's aircraft was renamed the Farman Experimental I, or F.E.1.

Although the remit of the Factory did not include the actual construction of aircraft, experimental alterations were sanctioned. Under O'Gorman a system of 'repairing' aircraft by replacing the entire airframe, often changing the basic configuration of the aircraft, was instituted. A letter from Theodore Ridge, the Works Superintendent, is worth quoting in full:

With reference to the Voisin Machine recently presented by the Duke of Westminster and delivered to the Wolsley (sic) Tools and Motor Co., I have to report that the method of controlling and steering this machine is obsolete and different to any present make; that the wood frame of the wings struts and canvas covering have deteriorated to such a degree that they should be replaced if the machine is to be flown in safety. I therefore desire to recommend that I may be instructed to fit this machine with certain spare wings and struts which I have in stock and alter the controls so that it is similar to the Farman type, and thus enable the machine to be flown by anyone qualified to fly a Farman type machine. I am in a position to effect these alterations quickly and economically and it would then be equal to a good Farman machine.

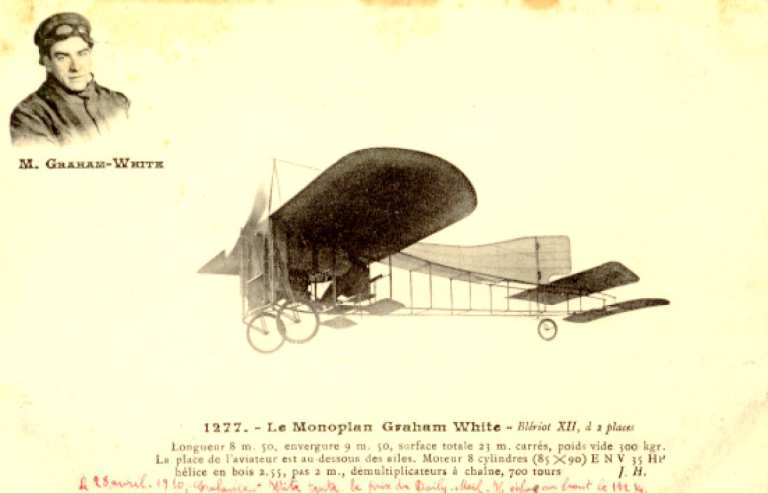
before... (Bleriot XII)

The first aircraft produced under this system was the S.E.1, ostensibly a refurbishment of a Blériot XII. This was destroyed in a crash before flight testing was complete, killing Ridge. In the hands of Geoffrey de Havilland the Voisin which had been donated to the Army Air Battalion by the Duke of Westminster was reborn as the B.E.1, a neat biplane with an excellent performance which first took to the air in December 1911. The B.E.1 was followed by the almost identical B.E.2 and a series of other aircraft, ostensibly improvements of the motley collection of aircraft in the Factory's possession, which in some cases did not even retain the original engine. It is ironic that the first visible fruits of a programme intended to bring order to chaos were the result of a subversion of the system.

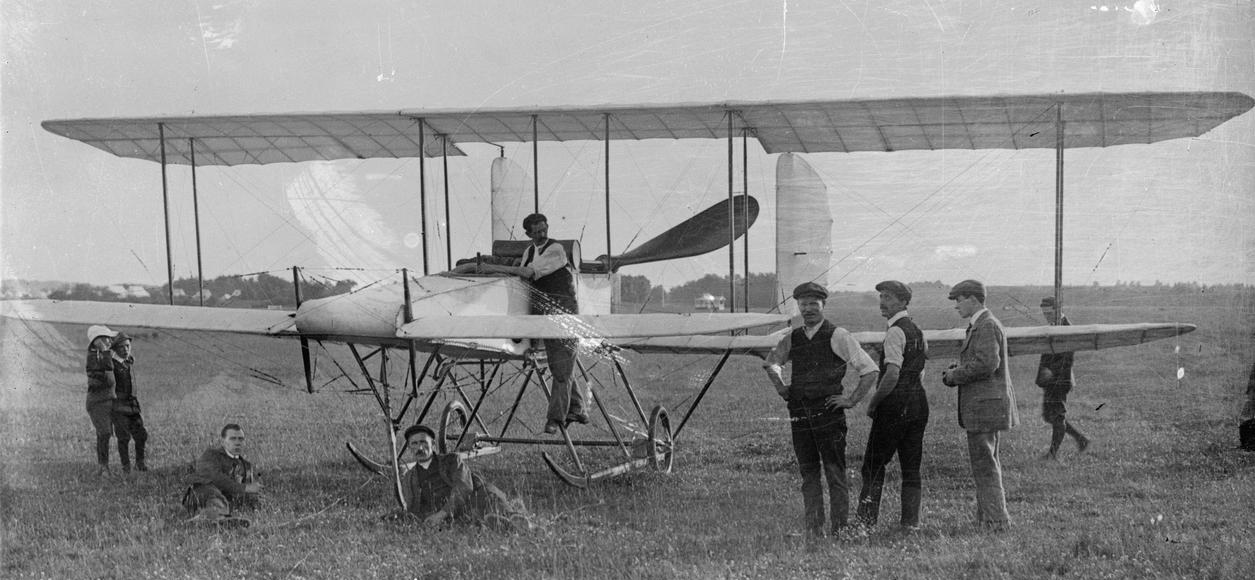
...and after (S.E.1)

The rational system of aircraft procurement was to be exemplified by the Military Aircraft Competition held on Salisbury Plain at Larkhill, announced late in 1911. The rules called for two-seater aircraft capable of various speed, climb, endurance and field operation conditions. O'Gorman was on the judging committee, so "factory" aircraft were not allowed to compete; nevertheless the B.E.2 put in regular appearances at the trials, where its performance was clearly superior to most of the competing aircraft. The B.E.1/B.E.2 design was mass-produced with minor changes as the B.E.2a and later developed into the B.E.2c by E. T. Busk. Busk's objective was to create an inherently stable aircraft for military observation purposes. Unfortunately the aircraft's stability resulted in a loss of manoeverability, and when German aircraft fitted with synchronised guns appeared in 1915 the losses of B.E.2c aircraft during the Fokker Scourge of 1915 led to a parliamentary inquiry. Although this did not find O'Gorman at fault it led to O'Gorman's departure from the Factory: his contract, which was to expire in October, was not renewed. O'Gorman, now holding the rank of lieutenant-colonel in the Royal Flying Corps, remained as a consulting engineer to the Director-General of Military Aeronautics from 1916 to 1919. While at the Royal Aircraft Factory, he also sat on the government's "Advisory Committee for Aeronautics", located at the National Physical Laboratory, under the chairmanship of Richard Glazebrook and presidency of John Strutt, Lord Rayleigh.

== Drag: use of the terminology ==
In 1913 Mervyn O'Gorman said in an article on “Stability Devices” 'I adopt "drag," the word suggested by Mr. Archibald Low, in preference to the word "drift," to express the "resistance to forward motion through the air." The word drift is badly wanted in aeronautics in its own time-honoured significance, so that the actual travel of an aircraft may be compounded of the distance which is travelled axially, and its 'drift', i.e., the amount it drifts with the wind.”'

== Subsequent career ==
He served as chairman of the Royal Aeronautical Society in 1921–22 and also, among many other appointments, as chairman of the Accident Investigation and Civil Air Transport committee of the Air Ministry and chairman of the 1931 League of Nations subcommittee on the rating of aeronautical engines. From the 1920s onwards his main interest was traffic management and road safety. He was vice-chairman of the Royal Automobile Club between 1928 and 1931, and vice-president in 1952. In 1930, in response to the recently passed Road Traffic Act he was instrumental in the RAC's publication of a simple guide for all road users, containing essential do's and don'ts; this idea was taken up by the Government, resulting in the first version of the Highway Code, published in 1931. In December 1934 O'Gorman presented a case for funding urgent research into measuring and recording traffic flows, traffic density and accidents to the British Science Guild so that measures could be taken to eliminate road accidents. Another contributor suggested that accidents were not a result of excess speed as four fifths of the motor accidents occurring in the metropolitan area involved vehicles travelling at less than 15 miles per hour. O'Gorman was also a frequent contributor to the letters page of The Times, mainly on motoring issues.

== Private life, death, and character ==
In 1897, at San Remo in Italy, O'Gorman married Florence Catherine Rasch who was 17 years his senior. She was the younger daughter of the late Arthur Augustus Rasch who had been a senior figure in the insurance industry prior to the death of his first wife.

From 1930 he was a member of the Art Workers Guild, and made etchings, linocuts and lacquer work; he also published a book of poetry, Verses Gloomy and Gay in 1933. Sir Geoffrey de Havilland describes him as a "man of great charm and humour, always interesting in discussion".

O'Gorman died at his home, 21 Embankment Gardens, Chelsea, on 16 March 1958. His wife had died in 1931.

=== Autochromes ===
O'Gorman also had artistic interests and was known as a pioneer of colour photography using the autochrome process, and his photographs feature in exhibitions of early colour photography.

A series of colour photographs he took in 1913 of his neighbour Edwyn Bevan's teenage daughter Christina dressed in red were included in the Drawn by Light exhibition in 2015 by the National Science and Media Museum and gained press and social media attention.

== Honours ==
O'Gorman was appointed a Companion of the Order of the Bath in George V's Birthday Honours list of 1913 whilst he was Superintendent of the Royal Aircraft Factory.

== Publications ==
- Bringing Science into the Road Traffic Problem (1934)
- Road Transport and the National Plan (1942)
- London Traffic Troubles (1943)
- The Roads of a Town IN The Empire Review (1943)
- O'Gorman's Motor Pocket Book (1904)
- Bringing Science into the Road Traffic Problem (1935)
- Road Traffic Policy: a pleas for data (1949)
- Operational Research on Road Traffic (1946)
- The Evils of Taxing Distribution by Road
- Small surprise (1950)

== Bibliography ==
- Lewis, Peter British Aircraft 1806–1914. London: Putnam, 1962
- Penrose, Harald British Aviation: The Pioneer Years. London: Putnam 1965
- Hare, Paul R. The Royal Aircraft Factory. London: Putnam, 1990 ISBN 0-85177-843-7
- Driver, H The Birth of Military Aviation. Woodbridge: Royal Historical Society, 1997
- Hare, Paul R. Aeroplanes of the Royal Aircraft Factory. Marlborough: Crowood, 1999 ISBN 1-86126-209-4
- Leon Bennett, Fall of the Red Baron - World War I Aerial Tactics and the Death of Richthofen, 2012
- Bruce Hales-Dutton, Pioneering Places of British Aviation: The Early Years of Powered Flight in the UK, 2020, p.214
- Tim Jenkins, The British Aircraft Industry During the First World War - The Dope Scandal, 2023, p.43

Government offices
Preceded by John Capper	Superintendent of the Balloon Factory; 1909–1912	Balloon Factory became Royal Aircraft Factory
Royal Aircraft Factory created from Balloon Factory	Superintendent of the Royal Aircraft Factory; 1912-1916	Succeeded by Henry Fowler
