= Charles Moore Watson =

Anglo-Irish army officer (1844–1916)

Sir Charles Moore Watson M.A. R.E. C.B. K.C.M.G.
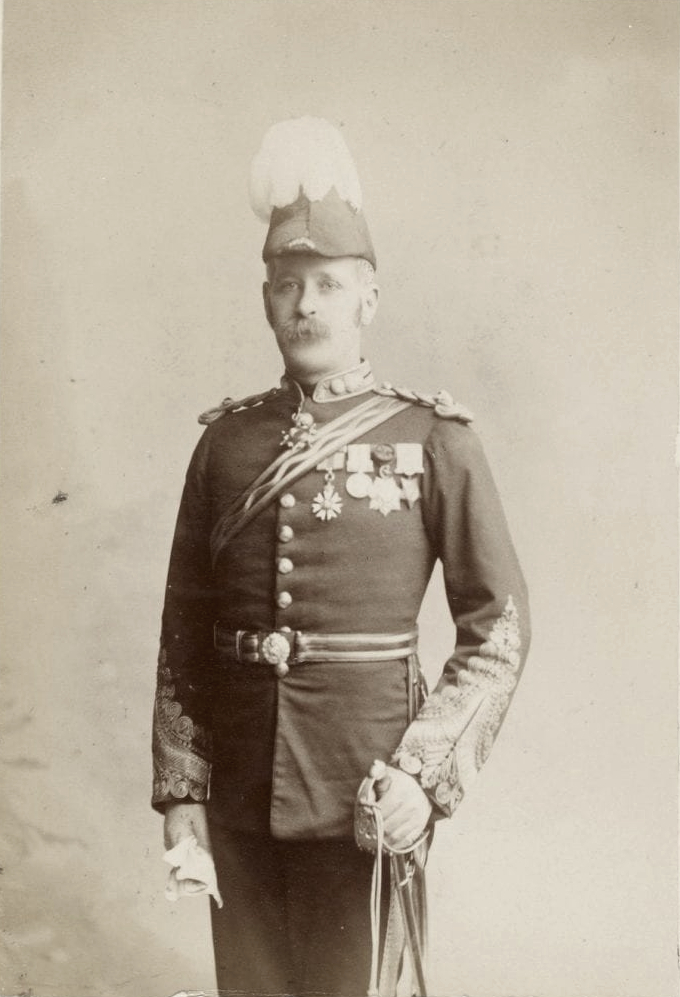
- 1887 photograph of Watson
- Born: 1844
- Died: 1916 (aged 71–72)
- Occupations: military officer, engineer, administrator, historian, biographer
- Title: Sir

Sir Charles Moore Watson (1844–1916) was a British Army officer, engineer and administrator. In later life he was known for his association with the Palestine Exploration Fund.

== Early life ==
He was the second son of William Watson, J.P., of Dublin, and his wife, Sarah, daughter of the Rev. Moore Morgan, rector of Dunlavin, born in Dublin 10 July 1844. His father worked for the City of Dublin Steam Packet Company, and died in 1883. Of his four sons, William and Edward followed him into business, and the other son Arthur became a soldier, dying in the British defeat at the Battle of Colenso. Charles was educated at Trinity College, Dublin.

Watson passed on to the Royal Military Academy, Woolwich. He passed as a lieutenant into the Royal Engineers in 1866. He spent two years at Chatham Dockyard, and then was moved to Cork Harbour and work in charge of the defences of Fort Carlisle there. In 1871 he returned to Chatham. He was involved there in experimental developments in naval mines for anti-submarine warfare, and ballooning, and on logistics for the Third Anglo-Ashanti War.

Tethered balloons were in military use in the American Civil War, and attracted attention from the Royal Engineers, with Frederick Beaumont and Sapper George Grover making trial ascents in 1863 with Henry Tracey Coxwell. Shortly after the outbreak of the Franco-Prussian War in 1870, a committee of the Royal Engineers was set up to look into innovations, and a Balloon Sub-Committee was formed of Beaumont, Grover and Frederick Abel. Peter Scratchley then replaced Grover, and then in 1873 Watson took over Beaumont's place on the Royal Engineers committee. Watson requested two balloons from Coxwell to go with the Ashanti expedition, but Abel came down against the idea.

== Sudan and points south ==
In 1874–1875 Watson served in Sudan under General Charles George Gordon, and was engaged in the survey of the White Nile. With William Harold Chippendall (1850–1942), also of the Royal Engineers, he mapped the part of the Nile between Fashoda (now Kodok) and Gondokoro, now lying in South Sudan, in October and November 1874. The larger task on hand was to map from Khartoum to Rageef (Rejaf). They then travelled south in 1874–5, to the area of Lake Albert. In 1875 Watson was elected a Fellow of the Royal Geographical Society.

== Administrator ==
Watson subsequently filled an appointment at the War Office. He was involved in the creation in 1878 of the Balloon Equipment Store at the Royal Arsenal, Woolwich; and the development of a military observation balloon was authorised. In 1882 the Store was moved to Chatham, and the development work on balloons by James Templer and Henry Elsdale came much closer to realisation in the form of a field unit.

In 1878, Watson was promoted to captain and aide-de-camp to Sir John Lintorn Arabin Simmons. In 1880 he began two years' duty in the India Office, receiving in 1882 the brevet rank of major.

== Egyptian army service ==
Watson was selected for special duty in the Anglo-Egyptian War of 1882. He served as an intelligence officer, with position DAQMG. He was present at the actions leading up to the battle of Tell El Kebir. In the aftermath Drury Drury-Lowe, commanding the Cavalry Division, received orders to seize Cairo from the supporters of Ahmed Urabi. Watson, at the head of a small force—a column of Indian cavalry and mounted infantry, joined by the 4th Dragoon Guards—led the advance from Bilbeis on Cairo. He received the surrender of the Cairo Citadel (14 September 1882). He continued to serve in the Egyptian army until 1886, when he became governor-general of the Red Sea littoral.

== Later life ==
In 1891 Watson was appointed assistant inspector-general of fortifications; he was promoted lieutenant-colonel in the following year, and in 1896 became deputy inspector-general of fortifications, a position which he held, with the rank of colonel, till his retirement in 1902.

In 1902 Watson was chosen to be the British delegate to the International Navigation Congress at Düsseldorf, and in the same capacity visited Milan in 1905 and St. Petersburg in 1908. In 1904 Watson acted as secretary to the royal commission for the organization of the British section of the St. Louis Exhibition and commissioner-general. He was chairman of the Palestine Exploration Fund committee from 1905 until his death, which took place in London 15 March 1916. He received the C.M.G. in 1887, and the C.B. in 1902, and in 1905 was created K.C.M.G.

== Works ==
Watson published:

- Comparative vocabulary of the languages spoken at Suakin: Arabic, Hadendoa and Beni Amer (1888)
- History of the Corps of Royal Engineers, vol. III, (1889)
- A Life (1909) of Major-General Sir Charles William Wilson
- Weights and measures as described in the laws of England from Anglo-Saxon times (1910)
- The Story of Jerusalem (1912)
- Fifty Years' Work in the Holy Land (1915)

== Family ==
Watson married on 11 May 1880, at St Mary's Episcopal Chapel, Montrose, Genevieve, elder daughter of the Rev. Russel S. Cook (1811–1864, died New York State), and granddaughter of César Malan. In July 1865 "Mrs. Russel S. Cook and 2 children" of New York travelled on the steamship Europe to France.
