= Russel Sturgis Cook =

Russel(l) Sturgis Cook (1811–1864) was an American Congregationalist minister, and served as secretary of the American Tract Society from 1839 to 1856. He was known also as Russell Salmon Cook, and developed colportage as a key part of the Society's business model.

== Early life ==
Cook was born in New Marlborough, Massachusetts. He attended Auburn Theological Seminary beginning in 1832. In 1836 he was ordained and became pastor at Lanesborough, Massachusetts.

== American Tract Society ==
In November 1838, Cook met William Allen Hallock (1794–1880) in New York, a minister and one of the founders of the American Tract Society (ATS). Shortly afterward, Cook became Visiting and Financial Secretary of the ATS. In 1841 he introduced a new approach to the colporteur system, sending recruits to Indiana and Kentucky. By 1851 800 individuals were employed as tract sellers through this system.

At a 1842 ATS fundraiser at the Broadway Tabernacle, Cook moderated the anti-Catholic rhetoric of the period by suggesting that Americans were likely no less sinful in areas such as drunkenness and Sabbath-breaking, than Catholic immigrants. Following the Compromise of 1850, Cook defended the Society's policy of not circulating abolitionist materials, arguing that its constitution allowed only the promotion of views reflecting the consensus of "evangelical Christians"; which did not exist on the issue of slavery. ATS director William Jay criticized this reasoning. and subsequently withdrew his financial support, explaining his decision in an open letter to Cook.

== Later life and death ==
Cook died at Pleasant Valley, New York on 4 September 1864.

== Works ==
- Home Evangelization: A View of the Wants and Prospects of Our Country, Based on Facts and Relations of Colportage (1849 or 1850, anonymous), by "One of the Secretaries of the American Tract Society". An enlarged version was published in England in 1859, edited by Mrs William Fison.

== Family ==
Cook was survived by his fourth wife. His wives were:

- Anna Maria Mills (married 1837); she was the daughter of the Rev. Henry Mills.
- Harriet Newell Rand (married 1841, died 1843); she was the daughter of the Rev. Asa Rand (1783–1871).
- Harriet Ellsworth (married 1845, died 1848, leaving no children); she was the daughter of William W. Ellsworth.
- Miss Malan, daughter of César Malan, married 1856–7 in Geneva on a voyage to Europe. Her sister Henriette Malan had married in 1850 James Cooley Fletcher, and another sister Cecile had married in 1850 another minister, Eli Edwin Hall (1818–1896).
