= British Army Dirigible No 1 =

Dirigible No 1
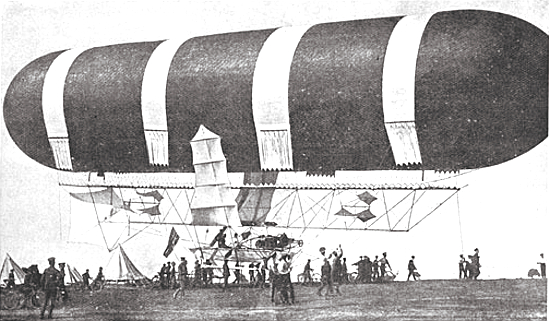

General information
- Type: Semi-rigid airship
- Manufacturer: Royal Engineers
- Designer: Col. John Capper and Samuel Cody
- Number built: 1

History
- First flight: 10 September 1907

British Army Dirigible No 1, christened Nulli Secundus (Latin: "Second to none") was a semi-rigid airship. First flown on 10 September 1907, it was Britain's first powered military aircraft.

== Design ==
Built at the Army's Balloon Factory at Farnborough, the early design work was carried out by Colonel James Templer, and it was completed by Colonel John Capper of the Royal Engineers and Samuel Cody, who was mainly responsible for developing the steering gear and power installation. It had a cylindrical envelope constructed from goldbeater's skin without internal ballonets, from which a long triangular-section framework of steel tubing was suspended by four silk bands. The control surfaces, consisting of a rudder and elevators at the rear, a pair of large elevators amidships and a further pair at the front, were attached to this framework, and a small gondola containing the crew and power installation suspended beneath it. It was powered by a 50 hp (37 kW) Antoinette engine driving a pair of two-bladed aluminium propellers via leather belts. The pitch of the propellers could be adjusted when the airship was on the ground.

== Operational history ==
The Airship Nulli Secundus

Nulli Secundus was first flown on 10 September 1907 at Farnborough, with Capper at the controls, assisted by Cody and Captain King. Two flights were made: during the first, the airship was flown for around three miles at a height of about 200 ft (60 m), the flight being terminated by an engine fault. A second flight was made later in the day, the propeller blades having been reduced in area in order to increase their speed of revolution.

A more public appearance was made on 5 October, when it was flown from Farnborough to London. Taking off at 11:00 pm and crewed by Capper, Cody and Lieutenant Waterlow, they made a tour over the city, taking in Whitehall and Buckingham Palace, and after circling St Paul's Cathedral, they attempted to return to Farnborough, but 18 mph (29 km/h) headwinds forced them to land at the Crystal Palace, Sydenham. The flight had lasted for 3 hours and 25 minutes and covered 50 miles (80 km) overland.

On 10 October, still moored at Crystal Palace to avoid damage in high winds, she was buffeted so severely that some of the guy ropes tore free. Hydrogen was released through escape valves and a slit was made in the envelope to speed up the process. Deflated and partially dismantled, the remains were taken back to Farnborough where it was rebuilt with alterations to become Nulli Secundus II.

== Nulli Secundus II ==
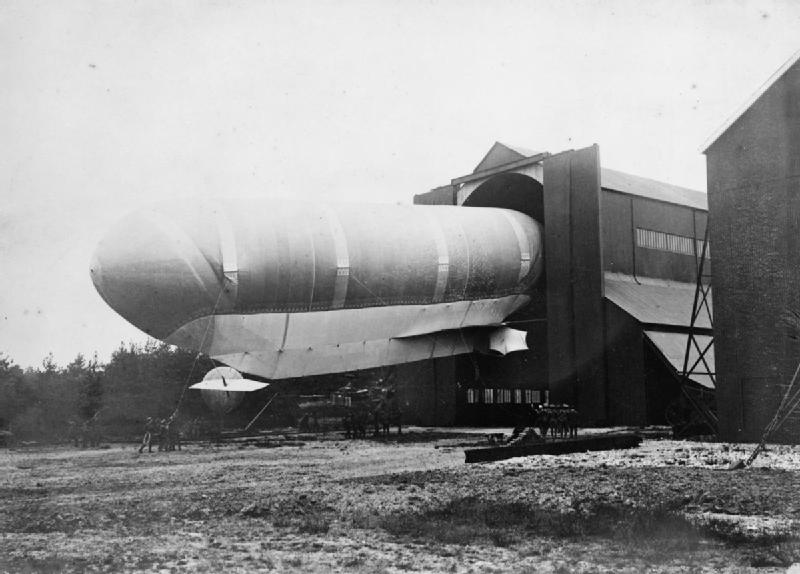
Nulli Secundus II being walked out of its shed

Following proposals for a new airship, it was decided to re-use the envelope of the first airship, which was enlarged to a capacity of 84,768 ft. New features included a silk outer skin over the whole structure, a new and revised understructure, a small additional "reserve" gasbag in the space in between, modified control surfaces including a forward elevator, modified drive train from the old engine, and a ground spike.

Nulli Secundus II was flown on 24 July 1908 in front of a crowd of several thousand people including General Horace Smith-Dorrien, Charles Rolls, and Frank Hedges Butler. The airship made only one subsequent flight, for the purpose of training Navy personnel. It was then scrapped, its engine being used to power Cody's British Army Aeroplane No. 1.

== Specifications (Nulli Secundus I) ==
Data from Lewis, Peter (1962). British Aircraft 1808–1914. London: Putnam. p. 548.

General characteristics

- Length: 122 ft 0 in (37.19 m)
- Diameter: 26 ft 0 in (7.93 m)
- Volume: 55,000 cu ft (1,557 m^{3})
- Powerplant: 1 × Antoinette water cooled V-8 piston engine , 50 hp (37 kW)

Performance

- Maximum speed: 16 mph (25.75 km/h, 14 kn)

== See also ==
- List of British airships
