= John Capper =

British First World War general

Major-General Sir John Capper KCB KCVO
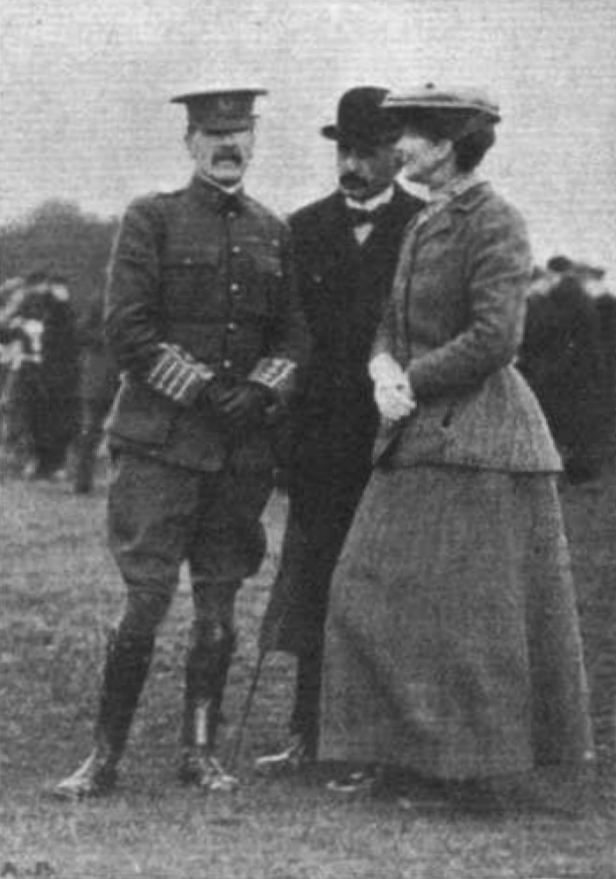
- Colonel J. E. Capper (left) watching Mr Cody's experiments with the British Army Aeroplane, February 1909
- Born: 7 December 1861; Lucknow, British India
- Died: 24 May 1955 (aged 93); Eastbourne, East Sussex, England
- Relatives: Major General Sir Thompson Capper (brother); Colonel William Capper (brother)
- Military career
- Allegiance: United Kingdom
- Branch: British Army
- Service years: 1880–1946
- Rank: Major-General
- Nickname: "Stone Age"
- Unit: Royal Engineers
- Commands: 24th Division; Royal Tank Corps
- Conflicts: Tirah campaign Second Boer War; First World War
- Awards: Knight Commander of the Order of the Bath; Knight Commander of the Royal Victorian Order; Commander of the Legion of Honour (France)

Major-General Sir John Edward Capper, KCB, KCVO (7 December 1861 − 24 May 1955) was a senior officer of the British Army during the late nineteenth and early twentieth century who served on the North-West Frontier of British India, in South Africa and during the First World War, where he was instrumental in the development of the tank. He was the older brother of Major General Thompson Capper, who was killed in action at the Battle of Loos in late 1915.

An experienced engineer, Capper was involved in numerous building projects during his years in India and pioneered the development of airships in Britain. He helped establish and command several military training establishments in Britain, was involved in large-scale military planning during 1918 and 1919 and was pivotal in establishing the tank as an important feature of the British Army. Although Capper was sometimes described as pompous and possessing poor communication skills, earning the nickname "Stone Age" for his attitude towards the ideas of junior officers in the Royal Tank Corps (later the Royal Tank Regiment), he nevertheless played a vital role in the development and deployment of armoured vehicles in the British Army.

== India, Burma and South Africa ==
John Capper was born in Lucknow, India to civil servant William Copeland Capper and his wife Sarah in December 1861. Returning to England at an early age for education, Capper attended Wellington College and upon leaving in 1880 enrolled in the Royal Military Academy, Woolwich from where he went on to study at the School of Military Engineering at Chatham, before subsequently being commissioned into the Royal Engineers as a lieutenant in July 1880. A capable engineering officer, Capper served in India and Burma for most of the first 17 years of his career, principally employed on military and public construction projects. He performed well in this position, being promoted to captain in 1889.

In 1897, Capper was attached to the force dispatched to the Tirah campaign on the North-West Frontier of British India. One of his tasks there was to supervise the construction of the first road for wheeled vehicles across the Khyber Pass. At the campaign's successful conclusion, he was promoted to major in April 1899 and transferred to South Africa while his wife Edith Mary (née Beausire) and their son John Beausire Copeland Capper returned to England.

Arriving in South Africa at the outbreak of the Second Boer War later in the year, Capper became deputy assistant director of railways, a vital job given the lengthy and dangerous supply routes along which the war was fought. In 1900, he received the brevet rank of lieutenant colonel and commanded several locally raised units, eventually becoming the commandant at Johannesburg. He returned to England in June 1902, following the end of hostilities the previous month, and on 22 August 1902 was appointed a Companion of the Order of the Bath (CB) in the October 1902 South Africa Honours list.

== Aeronautics ==
In 1903 he settled with his family at Bramdean House in Alresford, and was appointed Commander of the Balloon Sections, based at Aldershot under the command of Col James Templer. In October 1905 he was promoted to lieutenant colonel, and to brevet colonel in January 1906. Later that year, having briefly become the Balloon Companies, the organisation became the School of Ballooning with Capper, who in January that year had been promoted to brevet colonel, as its commandant. At about the same time the Balloon Factory was split off and moved to a new site nearby at Farnborough and, on Templer's retirement, Capper also became its Superintendent and was given the brevet rank of full colonel. Templer was retained at the factory under Capper to complete the development of Britain's first military airship, the Nulli Secundus ("second to none") in a purpose-built airship shed.

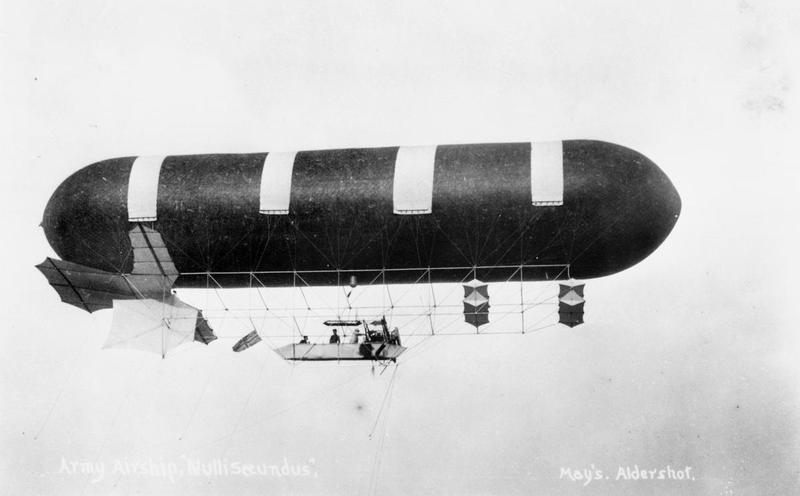
Nulli Secundus in flight

Capper not only supervised the British Army's ballooning and airship activities, but took a wider interest in aeronautics. In anticipation of the new airship, he took up the civilian sport of ballooning, flying in competitions initially as assistant to the Hon. C.S. Rolls and later with his own balloon "Pegasus" and his wife as assistant. These included the man-lifting "war kites" developed by Samuel Franklin Cody and the early work on aeroplanes by both Cody and J. W. Dunne. He also conducted fact-finding visits to the US, where he and his wife befriended the Wright brothers and became involved in protracted but ultimately futile negotiations for the War Office to buy a Wright machine.

Capper and Cody undertook the first successful flight of a British airship, the Nulli Secundus, over London in 1907.

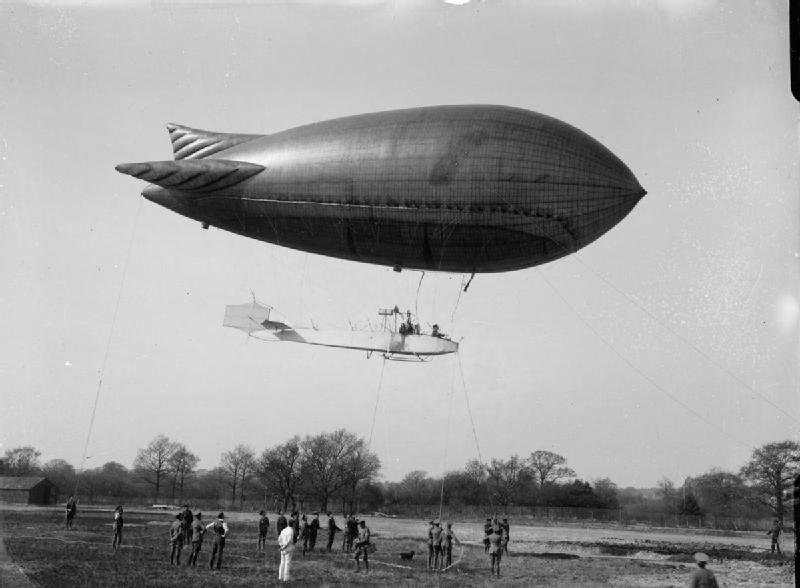
Baby when flown by Capper in 1909

Capper went on to modify the airship as Nulli Secundus II, parodied by Punch as "second to none the second", and a smaller experimental airship called Baby. Neither was an immediate success, although Baby would later be modified and have a long and successful career.

Capper oversaw the first Army aeroplanes. He briefly flew Dunne's first glider, the D.1, during secret trials at Blair Atholl in Scotland in 1907. The flight had lasted only a few seconds when the glider crashed into a wall, with Capper sustaining a cut to the head. The next year, Cody flew the first British-built aeroplane at Farnborough, which earned it the title British Army Aeroplane No.1. This was an ironic achievement for Capper's command, as he had pinned his personal hopes on Dunne, whose D.4 achieved no more than a few hops.

That autumn the government conducted a formal inquiry into military aviation. Capper had to return early from Blair Atholl in order to present his evidence. He argued strongly for a promising future of all forms of aeronautics and especially the aeroplane. However his Army superiors on the committee were against aeronautics in any form. It was decided that only small-scale airship experiments should continue and that aeroplane work should be stopped. It formally ceased when Dunne and Cody's contracts ran out at the end of March 1909.

Soon afterwards the Balloon Factory was removed from the command of the army and a new civilian superintendent, Mervyn O'Gorman, appointed. Capper remained in command of the Army Balloon School.

When Dunne left Farnborough, Capper was one of several friends who offered support for his efforts. In 1911, one of Dunne's new aeroplanes was exhibited at the Olympia Aero Show, with a placard stating it was "Built to the order of Col. J. E. Capper, R.E."

He relinquished this position in October 1910 and was placed on half-pay, and promoted to colonel. In April 1911 he was transferred to the School of Military Engineering at Chatham as its new commandant, marking the end of his aeronautical career.

== First World War ==
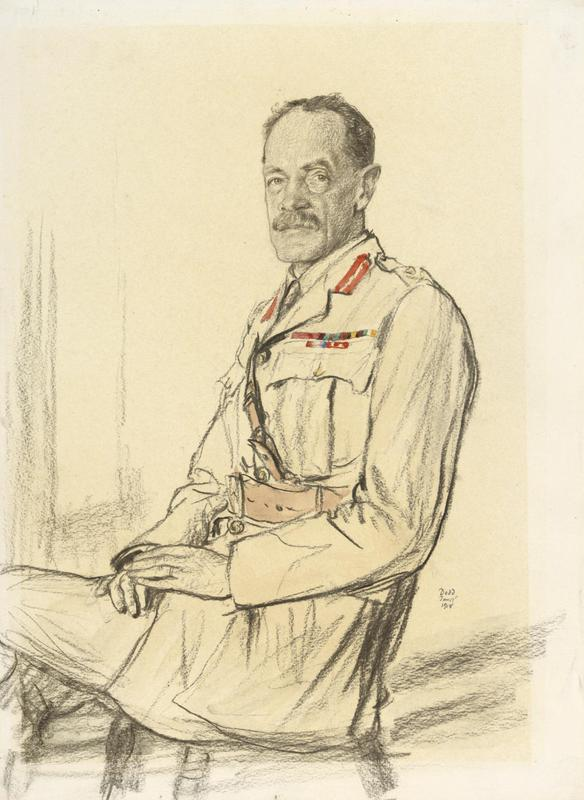
Major-General Sir John Capper

Capper remained at Chatham until September 1914 when the lack of experienced officers forced his transfer to France to join the British Expeditionary Force (BEF) in the early months of the First World War.

Promoted to the temporary rank of brigadier general later that month, Capper was first made deputy inspector of the lines of communications before being given the post of chief engineer to the III Corps. In June 1915 he was promoted to major general "for distinguished service in the Field" and made chief engineer of the Third Army. In October, following the deaths of several senior officers at the Battle of Loos, including Capper's younger brother Major-General Sir Thompson Capper, killed while general officer commanding (GOC) of the 7th Division, he was promoted to overall command of the 24th Division of Kitchener's Army. Capper remained in command of the division for the next 18 months, including periods of heavy fighting in 1916 at the Battle of the Somme, in which his son John was killed in action serving with the Royal Artillery. (Note: Second Lieutenant John Beausire Copeland Capper is buried in Flatiron Copse Cemetery at Mametz. The gravestone erected over his grave bears the inscription chosen by his next-of-kin: HE HATH TURNED THE SHADOW OF DEATH INTO THE MORNING.) The division also spent extensive periods of time in other sections of the line and gained extensive battle experience at the cost of high casualties. As a reward for his service in command of the division, he was presented with the Commander of the Legion of Honour by the French government.

In May 1917, he was recalled to England, initially to run the Machine Gun Corps training centre and from 28 July hold the position of director general of the newly formed Tank Corps at the War Office. Operational command of tanks at the frontlines was in the hands of Hugh Elles, the first commander of the Heavy Branch. Although tanks had first been introduced on the Somme the year before, their design and manufacture were both inadequate and the tactics of their deployment almost non-existent. Capper's job at the Tank Corps was to shape the organisation of the unit into an efficient battlefield force, improve mechanical reliability and develop effective tactics. It was in this role that Capper was given the nickname Stone Age, as his subordinates considered him to be unwilling to accept new innovations in tank tactics. In fact, Capper was an able tactician who worked with Colonel J. F. C. Fuller to develop a plan for a large scale armoured assault on German lines in 1919 (known as Plan 1919): his subordinates' prejudices were based on Capper's rigid adherence to the military hierarchy and his consequent failure to communicate his ideas to those below his rank. For his services as director general of the Tank Corps, Capper was made a Knight Commander of the Order of the Bath in June 1917.

== Retirement and final years ==
In July 1918, Capper left the War Office and commanded the 64th Division in England until May 1919, when the war was over, when he took over command of Number 1 Area in France and Flanders.

In July 1920, Capper became lieutenant Governor of Guernsey and took over command of the island's military installations, succeeding Lieutenant General Sir Launcelot Kiggell. He held the post for five years and during that time was made, in July 1921, a Knight Commander of the Royal Victorian Order and colonel commandant of the Royal Tank Corps in September 1923. Retiring from the army in July 1925, Capper remained associated with the Royal Tank Corps and also became a governor of Wellington College, associations he retained until 1946.

During the Second World War, Capper joined the Hampshire Home Guard and remained on duty with the unit until 1943. Post-War he retired fully to Bramdean House and remained there until shortly before his death. He was widowed in 1953 and died at the age of 93 at Esperance Nursing Home in Eastbourne in May 1955, leaving a daughter. In 1971, his collected papers, and those of his brother Thompson, who had been an instructor at the Staff College, Camberley, were donated to the Liddell Hart Centre for Military Archives at King's College London where they are still available to researchers.

== Notes ==
Military offices
Preceded by James Templer	Superintendent of the Balloon Factory; 1906–1909	Succeeded by Mervyn O'Gorman
New title Post created by separating the School from the Factory	Commander of the Balloon School; 1909–1910	Succeeded by Sir Alexander Bannerman
New command	GOC 24th Division; 1915–1917	Succeeded by Louis Bols
Preceded by Henry Lukin	GOC 64th Division; 1918–1919	Post disbanded
Government offices
Preceded by Sir Launcelot Kiggell	Lieutenant Governor of Guernsey; 1920–1925	Succeeded by Lord Sackville
