= Joseph Petavel =

English physicist and engineer (1873–1936)

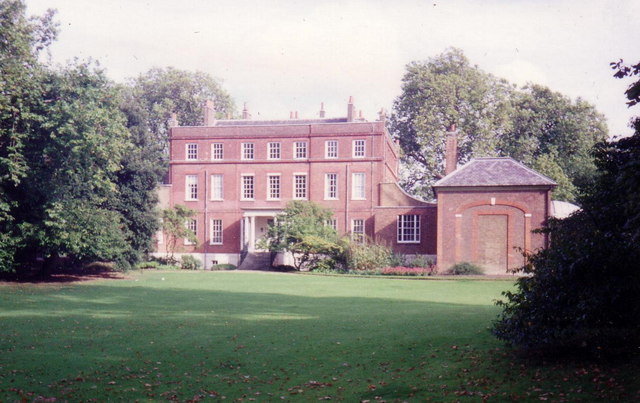
Bushy House - part of the NPL campus

Sir Joseph Ernest Petavel KBE FRS D.Sc. (14 August 1873 – 31 March 1936) was a British physicist and the 2nd Director of the National Physical Laboratory.

He was born in London and educated at Lausanne, Geneva, before he joined University College, London, in 1893, where he studied mechanical and electrical engineering. He was elected a Fellow of the Royal Society in 1907.

He was the second director of the NPL in Bushy Park from 1919 to 1936, living in Bushy House. During his time there he devised the Petavel gauge for the measurement of the pressures within exploding gases.

He was invested Knight Commander of the Order of the British Empire (KBE) in the 1920 civilian war honours for his wartime work as Chairman of Aerodynamics Sub-Committee of the Advisory Committee on Aeronautics.

He died at Bushy House and was buried in the west side of Highgate Cemetery.

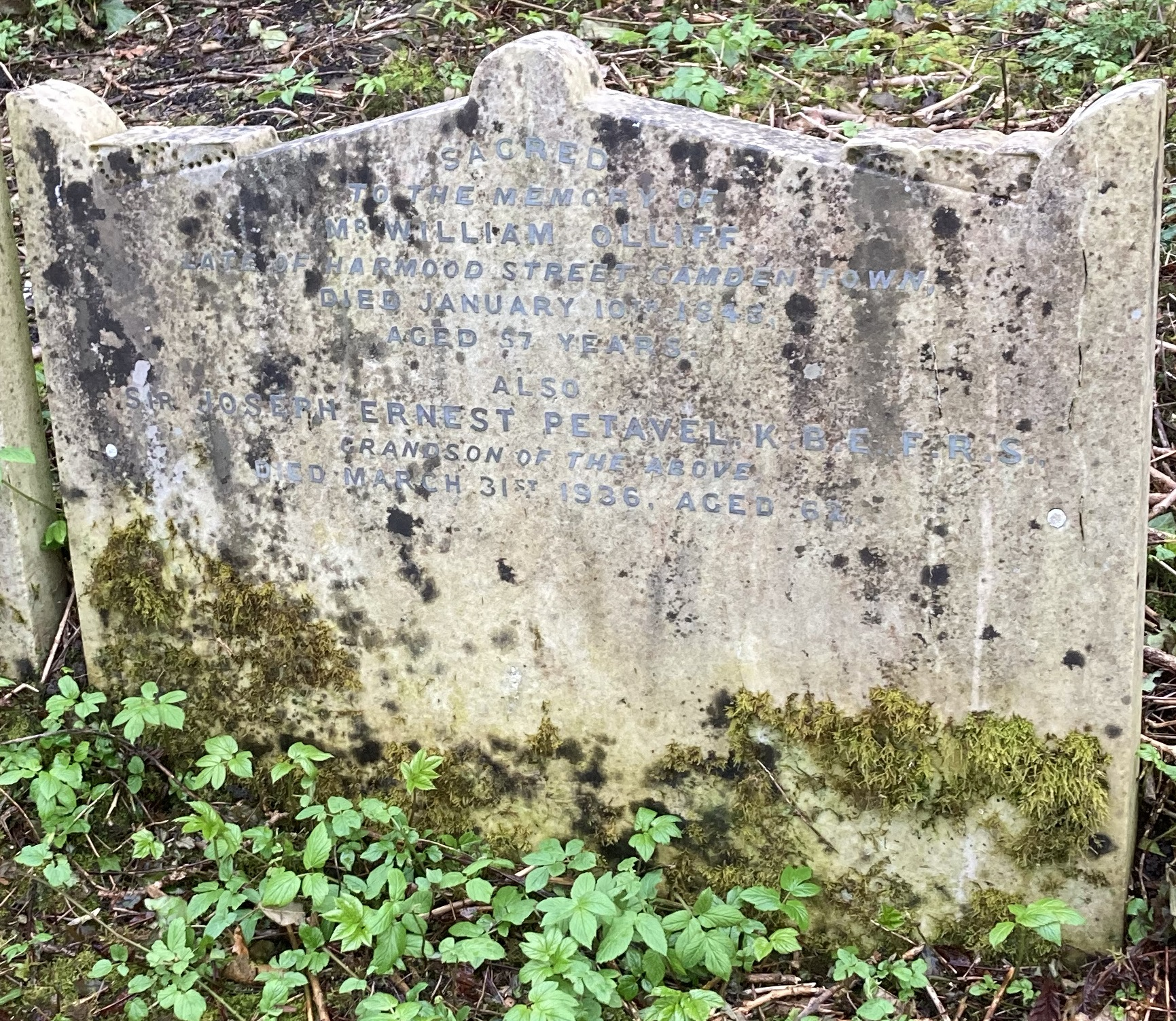
Grave of Sir Joseph Petavel in Highgate Cemetery
